= Manning Administration (2001–2010) =

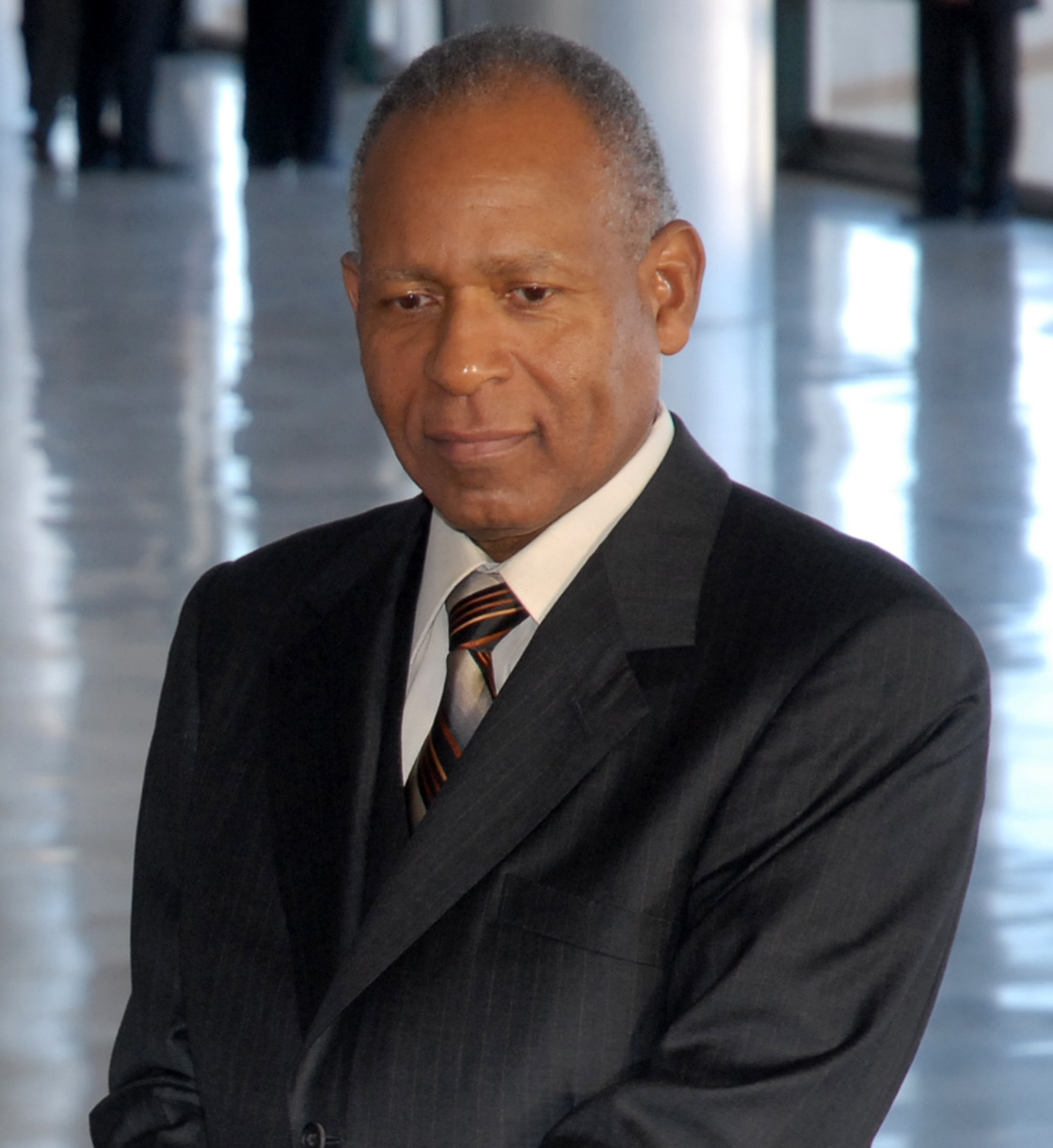
Patrick Manning (PNM),
Prime Minister

Patrick Manning was the prime minister of Trinidad and Tobago from 2001 to 2010. This page is a list of the members of his administration.

== The Cabinet ==
=== Inaugural Cabinet: 26 December 2001 – 9 October 2002 ===
Cabinet of Trinidad and Tobago
Portfolio	Minister
Attorney-General	Glenda Morean-Phillip
Minister of Foreign Affairs	Knowlson Gift
Minister of Finance	Patrick Manning
Minister of Local Government	Jarrette Narine
Minister of Education	Hazel Manning
Minister of Works and Transport	Franklin Khan
Minister of Health	Colm Imbert
Minister of Culture and Tourism	Pennelope Beckles
Minister of Housing	Danny Montano
Minister of Energy and Energy Industries	Eric A. Williams
Minister of Social Development	Pennelope Beckles
Minister of Legal Affairs	Camille Robinson-Regis
Minister of Sports and Youth Affairs	Roger Boynes
Minister of Planning and Development	Dr. Keith Rowley

=== 28 December 2001 – 9 October 2002 ===
Cabinet of Trinidad and Tobago
Portfolio	Minister
Minister of Trade and Industry	Kenneth Valley
Minister of Science, Technology and Tertiary Education	Hedwige Bereaux

=== 7 January 2002 – 9 October 2002 ===
Cabinet of Trinidad and Tobago
Portfolio	Minister
Minister of National Security	Howard Chin Lee

=== 8 February 2002 – 9 October 2002 ===
Cabinet of Trinidad and Tobago
Portfolio	Minister
Minister of Labour and Small and Micro-Enterprise Development	Lawrence Achong

=== 5 April 2002 – 9 October 2002 ===
Cabinet of Trinidad and Tobago
Portfolio	Minister
Minister of Agriculture, Land and Marine Resources	John Rahael
Minister of Community Development and Gender Affairs	Joan Yuille-Williams
Minister of Public Utilities and the Environment	Martin Joseph
Minister of Public Administration and Information	Dr. Lenny Saith

== Second Inaugural Cabinet: 15 October 2002 – 9 November 2003 ==
Cabinet of Trinidad and Tobago
Portfolio	Minister
Attorney-General	Glenda Morean-Phillip
Minister of Foreign Affairs	Knowlson Gift
Minister of Finance	Patrick Manning
Minister of National Security and Rehabilitation	Howard Chin Lee
Minister of Trade and Industry	Kenneth Valley
Minister of Local Government	Jarrette Narine
Minister of Education	Hazel Manning
Minister of Works and Transport	Franklin Khan
Minister of Health	Colm Imbert
Minister of Agriculture, Land and Marine Resources	John Rahael
Minister of Public Administration and Information	Dr. Lenny Saith
Minister of Culture and Tourism	Pennelope Beckles
Minister of Community Development and Gender Affairs	Joan Yuille-Williams
Minister of Housing	Martin Joseph
Minister of Energy and Energy Industries	Eric A. Williams
Minister of Labour	Lawrence Achong
Minister of Social Development	Mustapha Abdul-Hamid
Minister of Public Utilities and the Environment	Rennie Dumas
Minister of Legal Affairs	Camille Robinson-Regis
Minister of Science, Technology and Tertiary Education	Danny Montano
Minister of Sports and Youth Affairs	Roger Boynes
Minister of Planning and Development	Dr. Keith Rowley

== First reshuffle: 10 November 2003 – 21 March 2004 ==
Cabinet of Trinidad and Tobago
Portfolio	Minister
Attorney-General	John Jeremie
Minister of Foreign Affairs	Knowlson Gift
Minister of Finance	Patrick Manning
Minister of National Security	Martin Joseph
Minister of Trade and Industry	Kenneth Valley
Minister of Local Government	Rennie Dumas
Minister of Education	Hazel Manning
Minister of Works and Transport	Franklin Khan
Minister of Health	John Rahael
Minister of Agriculture, Land and Marine Resources	Jarrette Narine
Minister of Public Administration and Information	Dr. Lenny Saith
Minister of Tourism	Howard Chin Lee
Minister of Community Development and Culture	Joan Yuille-Williams
Minister of Housing	Dr. Keith Rowley
Minister of Energy and Energy Industries	Eric A. Williams
Minister of Labour	Lawrence Achong
Minister of Social Development and Gender Affairs	Mustapha Abdul-Hamid
Minister of Public Utilities and the Environment	Pennelope Beckles
Minister of Legal Affairs	Danny Montano
Minister of Science, Technology and Tertiary Education	Colm Imbert
Minister of Sports and Youth Affairs	Roger Boynes
Minister of Planning and Development	Camille Robinson-Regis

== Second reshuffle: 22 March 2004 – 13 May 2005 ==
Cabinet of Trinidad and Tobago
Portfolio	Minister
Attorney-General	John Jeremie
Minister of Foreign Affairs	Knowlson Gift
Minister of Finance	Patrick Manning
Minister of National Security	Martin Joseph
Minister of Trade and Industry	Kenneth Valley
Minister of Local Government	Rennie Dumas
Minister of Education	Hazel Manning
Minister of Works and Transport	Franklin Khan
Minister of Health	John Rahael
Minister of Agriculture, Land and Marine Resources	Jarrette Narine
Minister of Public Administration and Information	Dr. Lenny Saith
Minister of Tourism	Howard Chin Lee
Minister of Community Development, Culture and Gender Affairs	Joan Yuille-Williams
Minister of Housing	Dr. Keith Rowley
Minister of Energy and Energy Industries	Eric A. Williams
Minister of Labour	Anthony Roberts
Minister of Social Development	Mustapha Abdul-Hamid
Minister of Public Utilities and the Environment	Pennelope Beckles
Minister of Legal Affairs	Danny Montano
Minister of Science, Technology and Tertiary Education	Colm Imbert
Minister of Sports and Youth Affairs	Roger Boynes
Minister of Planning and Development	Camille Robinson-Regis

== Third reshuffle: 14 May 2005 – 15 January 2006 ==
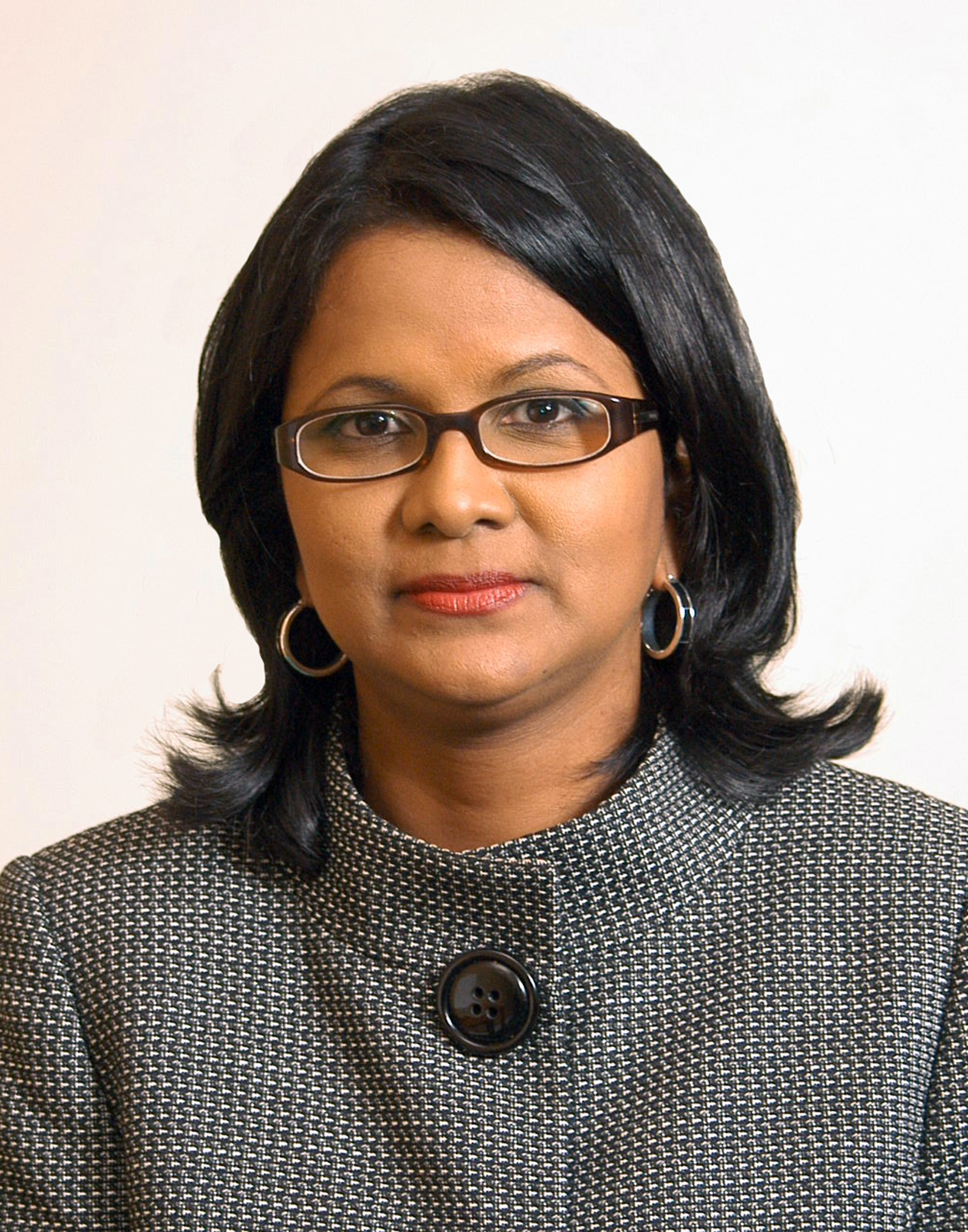
Minister of Legal Affairs, Christine Kangaloo

Cabinet of Trinidad and Tobago
Portfolio	Minister
Attorney-General	John Jeremie
Minister of Foreign Affairs	Knowlson Gift
Minister of Finance	Patrick Manning
Minister of National Security	Martin Joseph
Minister of Trade and Industry	Kenneth Valley
Minister of Local Government	Rennie Dumas
Minister of Education	Hazel Manning
Minister of Works and Transport	Colm Imbert
Minister of Health	John Rahael
Minister of Agriculture, Land and Marine Resources	Jarrette Narine
Minister of Public Administration and Information	Dr. Lenny Saith
Minister of Tourism	Howard Chin Lee
Minister of Community Development, Culture and Gender Affairs	Joan Yuille-Williams
Minister of Housing	Dr. Keith Rowley
Minister of Energy and Energy Industries	Eric A. Williams
Minister of Labour	Danny Montano
Minister of Social Development	Anthony Roberts
Minister of Public Utilities and the Environment	Pennelope Beckles
Minister of Legal Affairs	Christine Kangaloo
Minister of Science, Technology and Tertiary Education	Mustapha Abdul-Hamid
Minister of Sports and Youth Affairs	Roger Boynes
Minister of Planning and Development	Camille Robinson-Regis

== Fourth reshuffle: 16 January 2006 – 28 September 2006 ==
Cabinet of Trinidad and Tobago
Portfolio	Minister
Attorney-General	John Jeremie
Minister of Foreign Affairs	Knowlson Gift
Minister of Finance	Patrick Manning
Minister of National Security	Martin Joseph
Minister of Trade and Industry	Kenneth Valley
Minister of Local Government	Rennie Dumas
Minister of Education	Hazel Manning
Minister of Works and Transport	Colm Imbert
Minister of Health	John Rahael
Minister of Agriculture, Land and Marine Resources	Jarrette Narine
Minister of Public Administration and Information	Dr. Lenny Saith
Minister of Tourism	Howard Chin Lee
Minister of Community Development, Culture and Gender Affairs	Joan Yuille-Williams
Minister of Housing	Dr. Keith Rowley
Minister of Energy and Energy Industries	Dr. Lenny Saith
Minister of Labour	Danny Montano
Minister of Social Development	Anthony Roberts
Minister of Public Utilities and the Environment	Pennelope Beckles
Minister of Legal Affairs	Christine Kangaloo
Minister of Science, Technology and Tertiary Education	Mustapha Abdul-Hamid
Minister of Sports and Youth Affairs	Roger Boynes
Minister of Planning and Development	Camille Robinson-Regis

== Fifth reshuffle: 29 September 2006 – 7 November 2007 ==
Cabinet of Trinidad and Tobago
Portfolio	Minister
Attorney-General	John Jeremie
Minister of Foreign Affairs	Arnold Piggott
Minister of Finance	Patrick Manning
Minister of National Security	Martin Joseph
Minister of Trade and Industry	Kenneth Valley
Minister of Local Government	Rennie Dumas
Minister of Education	Hazel Manning
Minister of Works and Transport	Colm Imbert
Minister of Health	John Rahael
Minister of Agriculture, Land and Marine Resources	Jarrette Narine
Minister of Public Administration and Information	Dr. Lenny Saith
Minister of Tourism	Howard Chin Lee
Minister of Community Development, Culture and Gender Affairs	Joan Yuille-Williams
Minister of Housing	Dr. Keith Rowley
Minister of Energy and Energy Industries	Dr. Lenny Saith
Minister of Labour	Danny Montano
Minister of Social Development	Anthony Roberts
Minister of Public Utilities and the Environment	Pennelope Beckles
Minister of Legal Affairs	Christine Kangaloo
Minister of Science, Technology and Tertiary Education	Mustapha Abdul-Hamid
Minister of Sports and Youth Affairs	Roger Boynes
Minister of Planning and Development	Camille Robinson-Regis

== Third Inaugural Cabinet: 8 November 2007 – 22 April 2008 ==
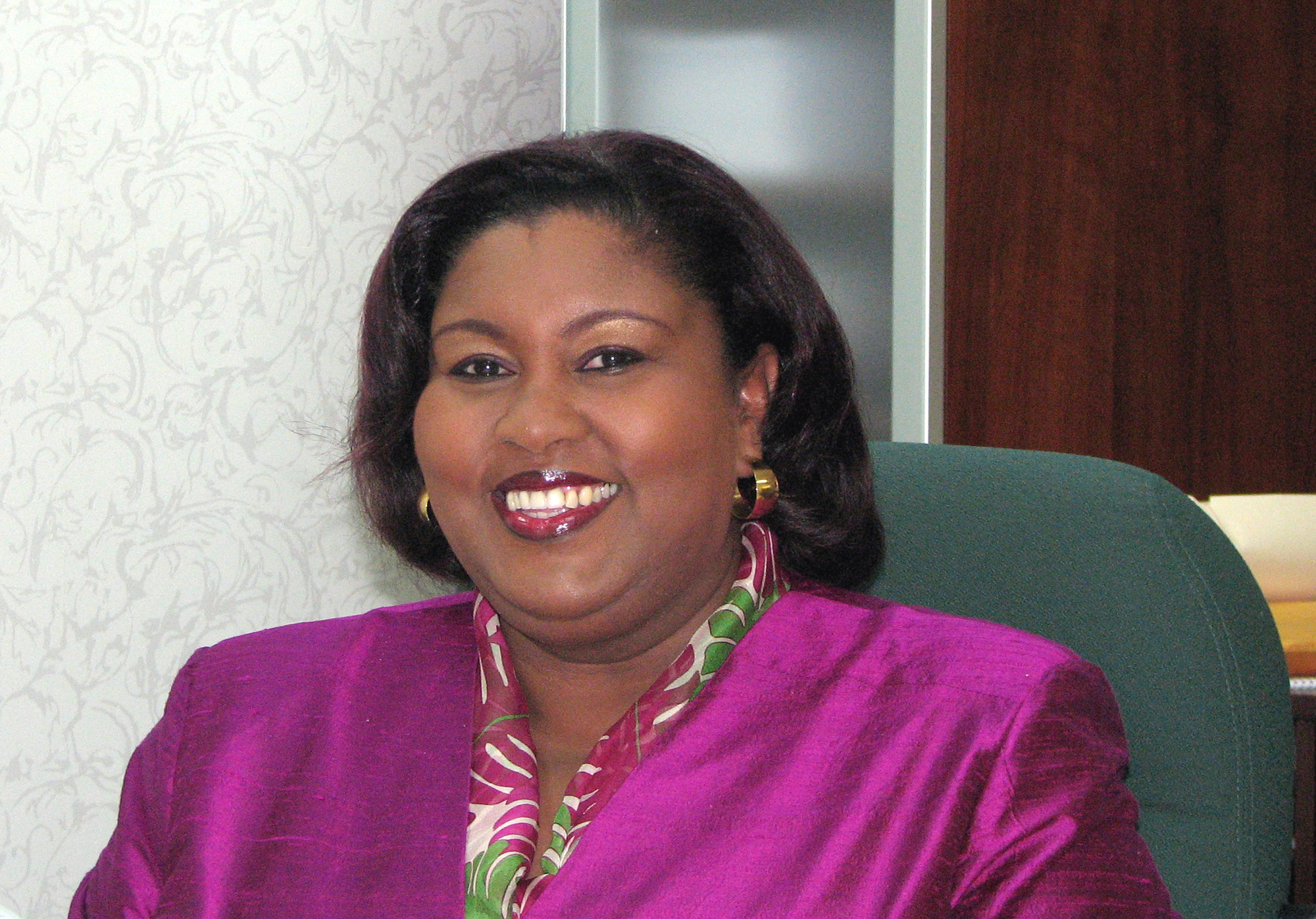
Minister of Community Development, Culture and Gender Affair, Marlene McDonald

Cabinet of Trinidad and Tobago
Portfolio	Minister
Attorney-General	Bridgid Annisette-George
Minister of Foreign Affairs	Paula Gopee-Scoon
Minister of Finance	Karen Nunez-Tesheira
Minister of National Security	Martin Joseph
Minister of Trade and Industry	Dr. Keith Rowley
Minister of Local Government	Hazel Manning
Minister of Education	Esther Le Gendre
Minister of Works and Transport	Colm Imbert
Minister of Health	Jerry Narace
Minister of Agriculture, Land and Marine Affairs	Arnold Piggott
Minister of Public Administration	Kennedy Swaratsingh
Minister of Tourism	Joseph Ross
Minister of Community Development, Culture and Gender Affairs	Marlene McDonald
Minister of Planning, Housing and the Environment	Dr. Emily Gaynor Dick-Forde
Minister of Energy and Energy Industries	Conrad Enill
Minister of Labour	Rennie Dumas
Minister of Social Development	Dr. Amery Browne
Minister of Public Utilities	Mustapha Abdul-Hamid
Minister of Legal Affairs	Peter Taylor
Minister of Science, Technology and Tertiary Education	Christine Kangaloo
Minister of Sports and Youth Affairs	Gary Hunt
Minister of Information	Neil Parsanlal

== Sixth reshuffle: 23 April 2008 – 25 May 2010 ==
Cabinet of Trinidad and Tobago
Portfolio	Minister
Attorney-General	Bridgid Annisette-George
Minister of Foreign Affairs	Paula Gopee-Scoon
Minister of Finance	Karen Nunez-Tesheira
Minister of National Security	Martin Joseph
Minister of Trade and Industry	Dr. Lenny Saith
Minister of Local Government	Hazel Manning
Minister of Education	Esther Le Gendre
Minister of Works and Transport	Colm Imbert
Minister of Health	Jerry Narace
Minister of Agriculture, Land and Marine Affairs	Arnold Piggott
Minister of Public Administration	Kennedy Swaratsingh
Minister of Tourism	Joseph Ross
Minister of Community Development, Culture and Gender Affairs	Marlene McDonald
Minister of Planning, Housing and the Environment	Dr. Emily Gaynor Dick-Forde
Minister of Energy and Energy Industries	Conrad Enill
Minister of Labour	Rennie Dumas
Minister of Social Development	Dr. Amery Browne
Minister of Public Utilities	Mustapha Abdul-Hamid
Minister of Legal Affairs	Peter Taylor
Minister of Science, Technology and Tertiary Education	Christine Kangaloo
Minister of Sports and Youth Affairs	Gary Hunt
Minister of Information	Neil Parsanlal

Government offices
Preceded by UNC Administration	Government of the Republic of Trinidad and Tobago; 2001–2010	Succeeded by People's Partnership Administration
