= 2007 Trinidad and Tobago general election =

- 5 November 2007

All 41 seats in the House of Representatives 21 seats needed for a majority
- Turnout: 66.22% (▼3.42pp)
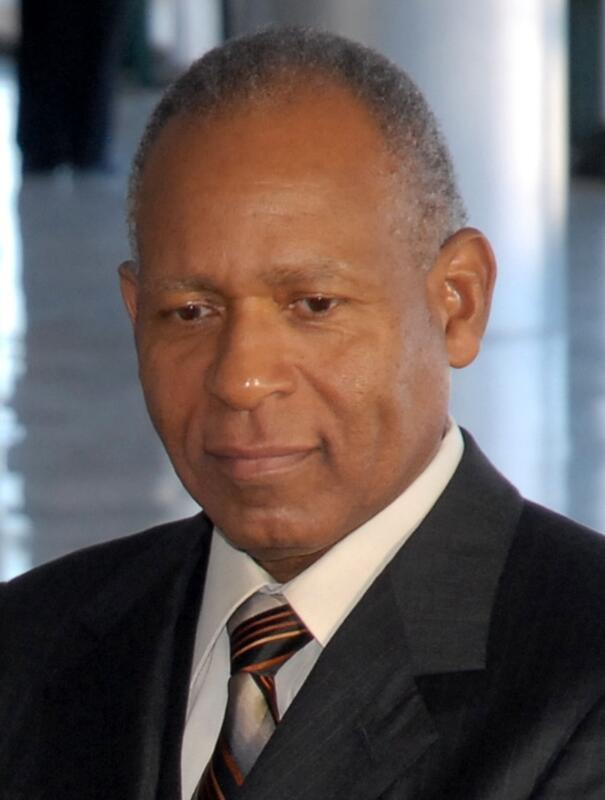

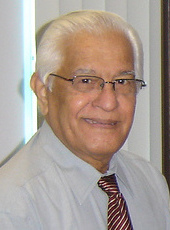

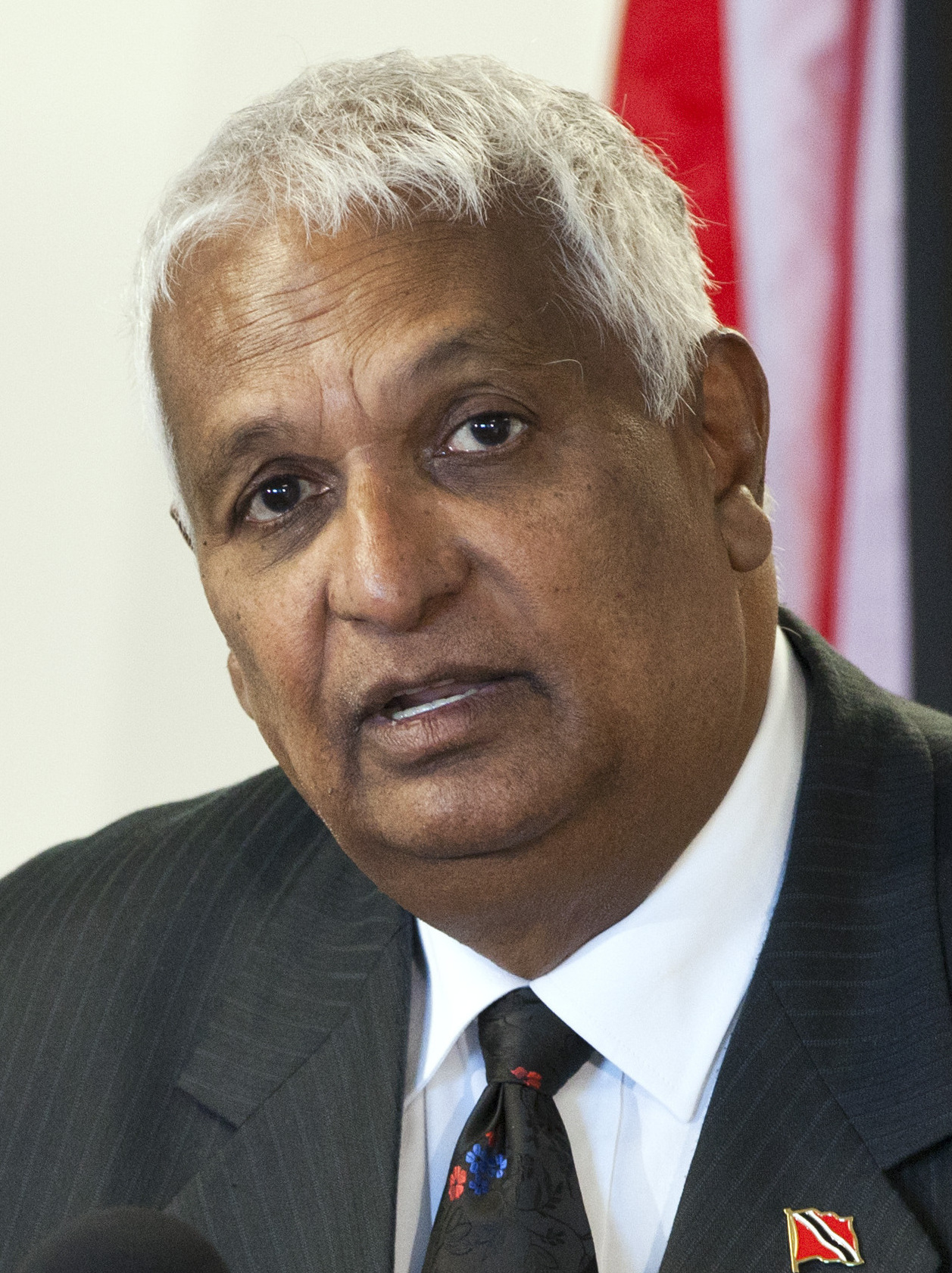
	First party	Second party	Third party
Leader	Patrick Manning	Basdeo Panday	Winston Dookeran
Party	PNM	UNC	COP
Last election	50.89%, 20 seats	46.87%, 16 seats	N/A
Seats won	26	15	0
Seat change	▲6	▼1	N/A
Popular vote	300,434	194,968	148,345
Percentage	45.99%	29.85%	22.71%
Prime Minister before election
Patrick Manning
PNM
Subsequent Prime Minister
Patrick Manning
PNM

General elections were held in Trinidad and Tobago on 5 November 2007. Nomination day was 15 October. Five parties contested the elections; the ruling People's National Movement, the official opposition United National Congress–Alliance (a coalition of the UNC and six smaller parties), the Congress of the People, the Tobago United Front–Democratic Action Congress (a Tobago-based party) and the Democratic National Assembly (a new party based in Tobago). Five independent candidates also ran.

== Candidates ==
Constituency	UNCA	PNM	COP
Arima	Wayne Rodriguez	Pennelope Beckles-Robinson	Rodger Dominic Samuel
Arouca/Maloney	Dianne Bishop-Bajnath	Alicia Hospedales	Kathy-Ann Jones
Barataria/San Juan	Nazeemool Mohammed	Joseph Ross	Jamal Mohammed
Caroni Central	Hamza Rafeeq	Shivanand Narinesingh	Prakash Ramadhar
Caroni East	Tim Gopeesingh	Harold Ramoutar	Ganga Singh
Chaguanas East	Kirk Meighoo	Mustapha Abdul-Hamid	Nirad Tewarie
Chaguanas West	Austin Jack Warner	Frankie Ranjitsingh	Manohar Ramsaran
Couva North	Basdeo Panday	Nal Ramsingh	Hulsie Bhaggan
Couva South	Kelvin Ramnath	Naim Ali	Devant Maharaj
Cumuto/Manzanilla	Harry Partap	Lennox Sirjusingh	Wendy Lee Yuen
D'Abadie/O'Meara		Karen Nunez Tesheira	Sherwin Alleyne
Diego Martin West	Daphne Phillips	Amery Browne	Rocky Garcia
Diego Martin Central	Steve Alvarez	Colm Imbert	Nicole Dyer-Griffith
Diego Martin North/East	Andy Williams	Keith Rowley	Joe Pires
Fyzabad	Chandresh Sharma	Andre Bernard	Mahendranath Dhaniram
La Brea	Ravi Ratiram	Fitzgerald Jeffrey	Gilbert Agard
La Horquetta/Talparo	Jennifer Jones-Kernahan	Roger Joseph	Delon Haynes
Laventille East/Morvant	Lennox Smith	Donna Cox	La Toya Callender
Laventille West	Juliet Davy	NiLeung Hypolite	Arthur Augustine
Lopinot/Bon Air West	Prakash Williams	Neil Parsanlal	Jerome Chaitan
Mayaro	Winston "Gypsy" Peters	Michelle Mischier Boyd	Rabindra Moonan
Naparima	Nizam Baksh	Geeta Rampersad	Rekha Ramjit
Oropouche East	Roodal Moonilal	Shafeeq Mohammed	Carol Cuffy-Dowlat
Oropouche West	Mickela Panday	Raghunath Mahabir	Kevin Ratiram
Point Fortin	Fitzroy Beache	Paula Gopee	Selby Wilson
Pointe-a-Pierre	Wade Mark	Christine Kangaloo	Carolyn Seepersad-Bachan
Port of Spain North/St Ann's West		Gary Hunte	Daniel Solomon
Port of Spain South	Anthony Sammy	Marlene McDonald	Sharon-Ann Gopaul-McNichol
Princes Town North		Marlon Mohammed	Navi Muradali
Princes Town South/Tableland	Clifton De Coteau	Peter Taylor	Desmond Lambert
San Fernando East	Ramesh Karapan	Patrick Manning	Mervyn Assam
San Fernando West	Bishop Jankee Raghunanan	Junia Regrello	Marlene Coudray
Siparia	Kamla Persad-Bissessar	Lutchman Rampersad	Govindra Roopnarine
St. Ann's East	Tricia Moraldo	Anthony Roberts	Gary Griffith
St. Augustine	Vasant Bharath	Nadra Nathai-Gyan	Winston Dookeran
St. Joseph	Carson Charles	Kennedy Swaratsingh	Gillian Lucky
Tabaquite	Ramesh Maharaj	Heeralal Rampartap	Anand Ramlogan
Tobago East		Rennie Dumas	
Tobago West		Stanford Callender	
Toco/Sangre Grande	Keshore Satram	Indra Sinanan Ojah-Maharaj	Lena Brereton Wolffe
Tunapuna	Christine Newallo-Hosein	Esther Le Gendre	Clyde Weatherhead

== Opinion polls ==
A poll conducted by the Caribbean Development Research Services (CADRES) and published by the Trinidad and Tobago Newsday in October 2007 showed the Congress of the People ahead of the ruling People's National Movement by 7%.

Another poll from August indicated that the election would be a very close race.

== Results ==
The PNM party under the leadership of Patrick Manning won 26 of the 41 seats in Parliament. The UNC-A, under the leadership of Basdeo Panday won the 15 remaining seats. The COP did not win any seats.

Party	Votes	%	Seats	+/–
People's National Movement	300,434	45.99	26	+6
United National Congress–Alliance	194,968	29.85	15	–1
Congress of the People	148,345	22.71	0	New
Democratic Action Congress	8,879	1.36	0	New
Democratic National Assembly	378	0.06	0	New
Independents	241	0.04	0	0
Total	653,245	100.00	41	+5
Valid votes	653,245	99.60		
Invalid/blank votes	2,600	0.40		
Total votes	655,845	100.00		
Registered voters/turnout	990,467	66.22		
Source: EBCTT, Caribbean Elections

=== Winning candidate by constituency ===
Constituency	Winner (Party)
Arima	Pennelope Beckles (PNM)
Arouca/Maloney	Alicia Hospedales (PNM)
Barataria/San Juan	Joseph Ross (PNM)
Caroni Central	Hamza Rafeeq (UNCA)
Caroni East	Tim Gopeesingh (UNCA)
Chaguanas East	Mustapha Abdul-Hamid (PNM)
Chaguanas West	Jack Warner (UNCA)
Couva North	Basdeo Panday (UNCA)
Couva South	Kelvin Ramnath (UNCA)
Cumuto/Manzanilla	Harry Partap (UNCA)
D'Abadie/O'Meara	Karen Nunez-Tesheira (PNM)
Diego Martin Central	Amery Browne (PNM)
Diego Martin North/East	Colm Imbert (PNM)
Diego Martin West	Keith Rowley (PNM)
Fyzabad	Chandresh Sharma (UNCA)
La Brea	Fitzgerald Jeffrey (PNM)
La Horquetta/Talparo	Roger Joseph (PNM)
Laventille East/Morvant	Donna Cox (PNM)
Laventille West	Nileung Hypolite (PNM)
Lopinot/Bon Air West	Neil Parsanlal (PNM)
Mayaro	Winston Peters (UNCA)
Naparima	Nizam Baksh (UNCA)
Oropouche East	Roodal Moonilal (UNCA)
Oropouche West	Mickela Panday (UNCA)
Point Fortin	Paula Gopee-Scoon (PNM)
Pointe-a-Pierre	Christine Kangaloo (PNM)
Port of Spain North/St. Anns West	Gary Hunt (PNM)
Port of Spain South	Marlene McDonald (PNM)
Princes Town North	Subhas Panday (UNCA)
Princes Town South/Tableland	Peter Taylor (PNM)
San Fernando East	Patrick Manning (PNM)
San Fernado West	Junia Regrello (PNM)
Siparia	Kamla Persad-Bissessar (UNCA)
St. Anns East	Anthony Roberts (PNM)
St. Augustine	Vasant Bharath (UNCA)
St. Joseph	Kennedy Swaratsingh (PNM)
Tabaquite	Ramesh Maharaj (UNCA)
Tobago East	Rennie Dumas (PNM)
Tobago West	Stanford Callender (PNM)
Toco/Sangre Grande	Indra Sinanan Ojah-Maharaj (PNM)
Tunapuna	Esther Le Gendre (PNM)

=== Votes by constituency ===
Constituency	PNM	UNCA	COP	DNA	TUF/DAC
Arima	8,603	1,224	3,464		
Arouca/Maloney	12,055	1,480	2,373		
Barataria/San Juan	7,179	5,362	3,817		
Caroni Central	4,579	7,615	4,400		
Caroni East	3,833	8,333	4,230		
Chaguanas East	6,757	4,993	4,086		
Chaguanas West	1,519	11,150	5,278		
Couva North	5,249	8,832	4,839		
Couva South	5,097	8,428	4,409		
Cumuto/Manzanilla	7,124	7,368	3,183		
D'Abadie/O'Meara	8,877	2,425	3,695		
Diego Martin Central	9,301	582	5,574		
Diego Martin North/East	9,349	877	5,023		
Diego Martin West	9,221	513	5,600		
Fyzabad	7,201	7,562	3,734		
La Brea	10,055	3,490	1,861		
La Horquetta/Talparo	8,324	3,494	2,593		
Laventille East/Morvant	11,069	1,107	1,535		
Laventille West	10,637	343	1,085		
Lopinot/Bon Air West	8,535	3,907	3,190		
Mayaro	8,137	8,613	1,939		
Naparima	2,892	10,338	4,290		
Oropouche East	3,081	10,156	5,489		
Oropouche West	3,629	8,570	4,198		
Point Fortin	9,257	2,640	3,838		
Pointe-a-Pierre	7,505	6,189	3,664		
Port of Spain North/St. Anns West	8,359	305	3,644		
Port of Spain South	7,823	566	3,141		
Princes Town North	5,298	8,231	3,824		
Princes Town South/Tableland	9,108	7,925	1,465		
San Fernando East	10,320	1,630	3,054		
San Fernado West	7,371	2,306	4,951		
Siparia	4,678	10,323	3,166		
St. Anns East	10,008	1,060	3,247		
St. Augustine	4,309	7,043	6,426		
St. Joseph	7,969	4,932	4,144		
Tabaquite	5,541	7,206	5,792		
Tobago East	5,684		237	148	4,703
Tobago West	6,850		471	230	4,176
Toco/Sangre Grande	9,557	3,864	3,214		
Tunapuna	8,494	3,986	4,182		
Total	300,434	194,968	148,345	378	8,879

The UNC-Alliance did not run for any seats in Tobago.
