= John Jeremie (politician) =

Lawyer and politician from Trinidad and Tobago

Attorney General of Trinidad and Tobago
- Incumbent
- Assumed office 1 May 2025
- Prime Minister: Kamla Persad-Bissessar
- Preceded by: Camille Robinson-Regis
- In office 29 May 2009 – 26 May 2010
- Prime Minister: Patrick Manning
- Preceded by: Bridgid Annisette-George
- Succeeded by: Anand Ramlogan
- In office 10 November 2003 – 7 November 2007
- Prime Minister: Patrick Manning
- Preceded by: Glenda Morean-Phillip
- Succeeded by: Bridgid Annisette-George

Government Senator
- Incumbent
- Assumed office 1 May 2025

Personal details
- Party: United National Congress (since 2025)
- Other political affiliations: People's National Movement (2000s)
- Occupation: Lawyer

John Jeremie is a lawyer and politician from Trinidad and Tobago who is the Attorney General of Trinidad and Tobago.

== Career ==
He served as attorney general in two governments for the People's National Movement between 2003 and 2007 and again from 2009 to 2010.

In the 2025 Trinidad and Tobago general election, he endorsed the United National Congress of Kamla Persad-Bissessar. After the UNC victory in the 2025 general elections, Jeremie was sworn in as Attorney General on 1 May 2025. He was also appointed Government Senator.
