= Loran–Manatee gas field =

Gas field near Venezuela in the Atlantic Ocean

Loran–Manatee
- Country: Venezuela/Trinidad and Tobago
- Region: Atlantic Ocean
- Offshore/onshore: offshore
- Operator: PDVSA/Chevron Corporation

Field history
- Discovery: 1983
- Start of production: 2013

Production
- Current production of gas: 21.4×10^{6} m^{3}/d 750×10^{6} cu ft/d 7.62×10^{9} m^{3}/a (269×10^{9} cu ft/a)
- Estimated gas in place: 293×10^{9} m^{3} 10.25×10^{12} cu ft

The Loran–Manatee gas field natural gas field is located on the continental shelf of the Atlantic Ocean. It was discovered in 1983 and developed by PDVSA. It began production in 2013 and produces natural gas and condensates. The total proven reserves of the Loran–Manatee gas field are around 10.25 trillion cubic feet (293 km^{3}), and production is slated to be around 750 million cubic feet/day (21.4 million m^{3}) in 2018.

According to a 2013 agreement, Venezuela owns 73.75% of the joint field and Trinidad and Tobago own the remaining 26.25%.

Trinidad and Tobago originally planned to develop the gas field in cooperation with the Venezuelan PDVSA, but in 2020 Prime Minister Keith Rowley announced that Trinidad and Tobago would develop the field independently, citing U.S. sanctions against Venezuelan companies.
