= Eric A. Williams =

Trinidad and Tobago politician

Eric A. Williams was a Trinidad and Tobago politician until November 2007 and was Member of Parliament for Port of Spain South. Until his resignation from the Cabinet in January 2006, he served as the Minister of Energy and Energy Industries in the then People's National Movement government, a post he had held since December 2001.

In a now discredited February 2004 letter to then Prime Minister and Political Leader of the PNM Patrick Manning, PNM Councillor Dansam Dhansook alleged that he had paid a TT$75,000 (approx. US$12,000) bribe to Williams in seven separate payments over the period January to July 2003; one of TT$15,000 and six of TT$10,000. The letter was made public on 27 April 2005, when it was read in the House of Representatives by Prime Minister (as of May 2010) Kamla Persad-Bissessar, United National Congress MP for Siparia. Dhansook has since publicly apologised to Mr Williams, his colleague Mr Franklin Khan, and the citizens of Trinidad and Tobago for his role in this entire matter.

On 7 January 2006 seven warrants for Williams arrest were issued on a charge of misconduct in public office for corruptly receiving $75,000 in 2003. Williams who maintained his innocence, but "senior government members" predicted correctly that he would resign his ministerial portfolio on 9 January 2006. On January 9 the seven charges were laid indictably against Williams. He was granted bail of TT$600,000.

No PNM officials appeared at his hearings over the two-year duration of the Preliminary Inquiry, other than then Mayor of San Fernando Ian Atherly and former Councillor Cynthia Pipier of the Port-of-Spain City Corporation. However, three then Ministers, Fitzgerald Hinds, then a Minister of State and now a Senator in the Opposition, Dr. Keith Rowley (who was being investigated by the Integrity Commission but has since been exhonerated while a member of the Cabinet and is now the Leader of the Opposition and Leader of the PNM) and Diane Seukeran, former MP for San Fernando West and then a Minister of State, spoke to the press in his defence.

On December 31, 2007, all charges against Mr. Williams were dismissed. His accuser Dansam Dhansook was declared to be 'manifestly unreliable as a witness' by Senior Magistrate L. Cardinez-Ragoonanan who presided over the Preliminary Inquiry into the charges.

== See also ==
- Franklin Khan
