= Hazel Manning =

Trinbagonian politician (born 1949)

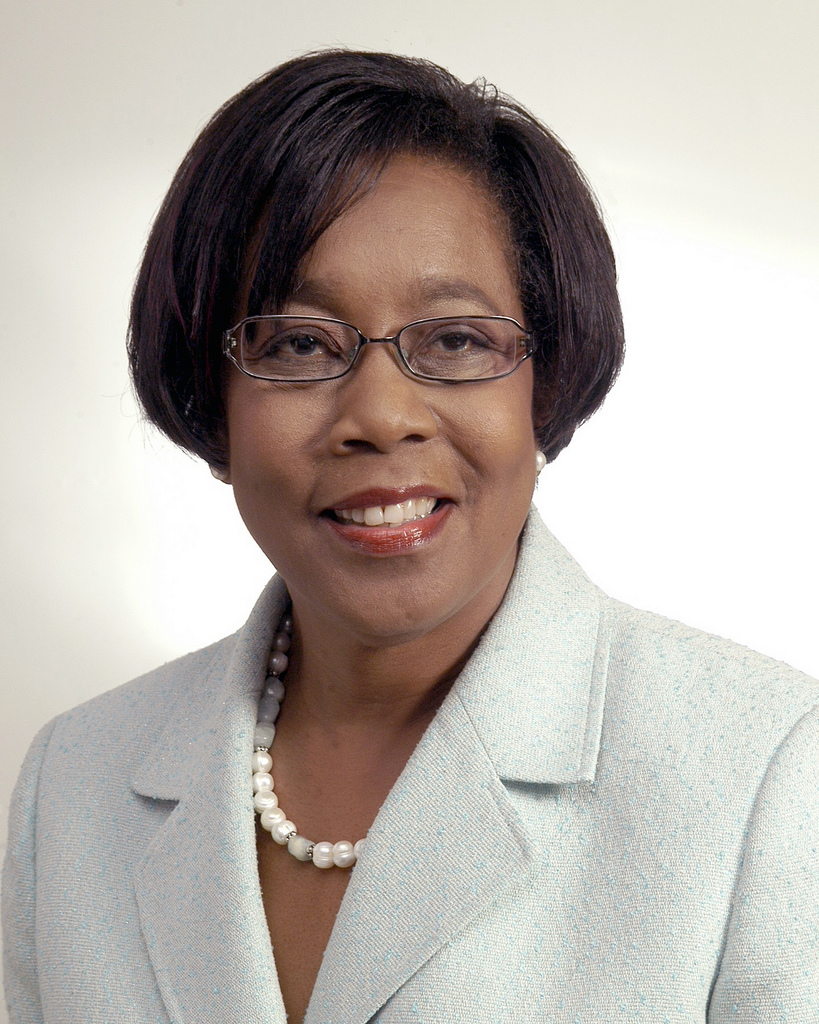
- Hazel Manning

Minister of Local Government
- In office 8 November 2007 – 25 May 2010
- Prime Minister: Patrick Manning
- Succeeded by: Kamla Persad-Bissessar

Minister of Education
- In office 26 December 2001 – 7 November 2007
- Prime Minister: Patrick Manning
- Succeeded by: Keith Rowley

Spouse of the Prime Minister of Trinidad and Tobago
- In office 24 December 2001 – 26 May 2010
- Prime Minister: Patrick Manning
- Preceded by: Oma Panday
- Succeeded by: Gregory Bissessar

Spouse of the Prime Minister of Trinidad and Tobago
- In office 17 December 1991 – 9 November 1995
- Prime Minister: Patrick Manning
- Preceded by: Patricia Robinson
- Succeeded by: Oma Panday

Personal details
- Born: Hazel Anne Marie Manning; 11 August 1949 San Fernando, Trinidad and Tobago
- Party: People's National Movement
- Spouse: Patrick Manning (1972–2016)
- Education: University of the West Indies
- Occupation: Public servant Senator; Politician

Hazel Anne Marie Manning (11 August 1949) is a former Trinidad and Tobago politician. She entered the Senate as a People's National Movement Senator after the 2001 general election. Senator Manning served as Minister of Education of Trinidad and Tobago and subsequently as Minister of Local Government. She is also the widow of former Prime Minister Patrick Manning.

She was born in the southern city of San Fernando and received her secondary education at St. Joseph's Convent, San Fernando. She obtained her bachelor's degree from the University of the West Indies at St. Augustine in the social sciences. She subsequently obtained a postgraduate diploma in administration. She and Patrick Manning were married in 1972. They have two sons, Brian and David.

Her career has included working in various agencies, including the Town and Country Planning Division of the Ministry of Planning and Development, where she was head of its research unit. She also worked for several years as a social impact assessment consultant.
