= Rennie Dumas =

Trinidad and Tobago politician

Member of the House of Representatives for Tobago East
- In office 5 November 2007 – 24 May 2010
- Preceded by: Eudine Job-Davis
- Succeeded by: Vernella Alleyne-Toppin

Senator
- In office 12 January 2001 – 7 November 2007

Personal details
- Party: People's National Movement

Rennie Dumas (died 14 May 2017) was a Trinidad and Tobago politician from the People's National Movement.

== Career ==
He was elected MP at the 2007 Trinidad and Tobago general election for the People's National Movement. He served as a minister in the Manning Administration.

In 2013, he was spared jail after he was found guilty of common assault and grievous body harm.

Dumas died in 2017. Former colleagues who attended his funeral included Mustapha Abdul-Hamid, Colm Imbert, Faris Al-Rawi and Camille Robinson-Regis.

== See also ==
- List of Trinidad and Tobago Members of Parliament
