= Attorney General of Trinidad and Tobago =

Government minister and legal advisor in Trinidad and Tobago

- Coat of arms of Trinidad and Tobago

- Flag of Trinidad and Tobago
- Incumbent; John Jeremie since 1 May 2025
- Office of the Attorney General
- Style: The Honourable
- Member of: Senate; Cabinet
- Reports to: Parliament; Prime Minister
- Appointer: President on the advice of the prime minister
- Term length: At the pleasure of the president
- Precursor: Office of the Attorney General and Ministry of Legal Affairs
- Inaugural holder: Archibald Gloster
- Formation: 1805
- Final holder: Camille Robinson-Regis
- Deputy: Minister in the Ministry of Attorney General, Devesh Maharaj
- Salary: TT$ 492,360 (2019) annually
- Website: agla.gov.tt

According to the Constitution of Trinidad and Tobago, the supreme law of the nation, the attorney general of Trinidad and Tobago is the primary legal advisor to the government of Trinidad and Tobago. The current attorney general is John Jeremie appointed on 1 May 2025. Devesh Maharaj is a Minister in the Office of the Attorney General, he is also the Minister of Justice. Saddam Hosein is the Minister of land and Legal Affairs.

== Roles and function ==
The attorney general is a member of the Government and has two separate constitutional roles, a governmental role, in which he acts as a member of Government in the performance of his duties, and a role as the guardian of the public interest, when he acts independently in a quasi-judicial capacity.

The provisions of the Constitution of the Republic of Trinidad and Tobago require the attorney general to be responsible for the administration of legal affairs within the country. Legal proceedings for and against the State must be taken in the name of the attorney general (in the case of civil proceedings) and in the name of the State (in the case of criminal proceedings).

The attorney general has responsibility for the following departments

- Anti-Money Laundering, Counter Financing of Terrorism and Proliferation Financing (AML/CFT/PF)
  - Anti-Terrorism Unit
  - (AML/CFT/PF) Compliance Unit
- Anti-Corruption Investigation Bureau
- Appointment to Quasi Judicial Bodies
- Department of Civil Law
- Office of the Solicitor General
  - Administrator General
  - Civil Litigation
  - Conveyancing
  - Custodian of Enemy Property
  - Government Contracts
  - Legal Advice to Government
  - Provisional Liquidator
  - Provisional Receiver
  - Public Trustee/Official Receiver
- Chief State Attorney
- Children's Attorney
- Criminal Justice Unit
- International Office of Child Rights
- International Law and Human Rights Unit
- Judiciary
- Law Reform
- Legislative Agenda
- National Anti-Money Laundering and Counter Financing of Terrorism Committee
- National Biosafety
- Office of the Chief Parliamentary Counsel
  - Legislative Drafting
- Office of the Director of Public Prosecutions

Statutory Boards and Other Bodies:

- Central Authority
- Civil Child Abduction Authority
- Industrial Court Law Reform Commission
- Strategic Services Agency
  - Intelligence
  - Strategy

== List of attorneys-general ==
=== Trinidad only ===
- Gloster c.1805
- H. Fuller c.1828
- Wylie c.1832 (acting)
- Edward Jackson, c.1840 (died 1846)
- Charles William Warner, 1844 to 1870
- George Garcia, 1870 to 1873
- Henry Ludlow, 1874 to 1886
- Stephen Herbert Gatty, 1886 to 1889

=== Trinidad united with Tobago, 1889 ===
- Stephen Herbert Gatty, 1889 to ?1892
- George Lewis Garcia, 1892 to ?
- Vincent Brown, 1903 to ?
- Henry Gollan, 1911 to 1918
- Robert Stewart Aucher Warner, 1918 to ?1922
- Sir Atholl MacGregor, 1926 to 1929
- Charles Wilton Wood Greenidge c.1930
- Frederic Gordon Smith, 1932 to 1935
- Sir Justin Louis Devaux 1935–1940
- Wilcox Wilson c.1945
- Joseph Leon Mathieu Perez, c.1950 to 1957
- Sir Ellis Clarke, 1957 to 1961

==== Trinidad and Tobago became independent, 1962 ====
- George Armsby Richards, 1962 to 1969
- Karl Terrence Hudson-Phillips, 1969 to 1973
- Benjamin Pitt, 1973 to 1976
- Selwyn A. Richardson, 1976 to 1981
- Russell Martineau, 1981 to 1986
- Selwyn A. Richardson, 1986 to 1989
- Anthony Smart, 1989 to 1991
- Keith Sobion, 1991 to 1995
- Kamla Persad-Bissessar, Nov. 1995 to Feb. 1996
- Ramesh Lawrence Maharaj, Feb. 1996 to Oct. 2001
- Kamla Persad-Bissessar, Oct. 2001 to Dec. 2001
- Glenda Morean-Phillip, Dec. 2001 to Nov. 2003
- John Jeremie, 2003 to 2007
- Bridgid Annisette-George, 2007 to 2009
- John Jeremie, May, 2009 to 2010
- Anand Ramlogan, 2010 to 2015
- Garvin Nicholas, 3 February 2015 to 9 September 2015
- Faris Al-Rawi, 9 September 2015 to 16 March 2022
- Reginald Armour, 16 March 2022 to March 2025
- Camille Robinson-Regis, 17 March 2025 to 30 April 2025
- John Jeremie, 1 May 2025 to present

== Ministry of Land and Legal Affairs ==
Minister of Land and legal Affairs of Trinidad and Tobago
- The "Coat of Arms" is used as the Ministry's seal.

- Flag of Trinidad and Tobago
- Incumbent; Saddam Hosein since 12 May 2025
- Ministry of Land and Legal affairs
- Style: Minister
- Member of: House of Representatives; Cabinet
- Reports to: Parliament; Prime Minister
- Seat: Port of Spain
- Nominator: Prime Minister
- Appointer: President on the advice of the prime minister
- Precursor: Office of the Attorney General and Minister of legal Affairs
- Final holder: Camille Robinson-Regis
- Website: https://agla.gov.tt/

The Minister of Land and Legal Affairs has responsibility for the following departments:

- Law Revision
- Commissioner of Affidavits
- Justice of the Peace
- Lands and Surveys
- Land Management
- Liquor License
- Marriage License
- Regularisation of Tenure/Housing for Squatters
- Surveys and Mapping
- Valuation
- Registrar General
  - Companies Registry
  - Civil Registry
  - Land Registry
  - Rent Restriction
- Intellectual Property
  - Industrial Property
  - Copyright and Related Rights
  - Trademarks

Statutory Boards and Other Bodies:

- Law Revision Commission
- Land Settlement Agency
- Land Survey Board of Trinidad and Tobago
- Rent Assessment Board

Wholly Owned Enterprises:

- Estate Management and Business Development Company Limited

== Ministry of Justice ==
The Minister of Justice has responsibility for the following departments:

- Alternate Dispute Resolution
- Construction and Refurbishment of the Court Facilities for the Judiciary
- Criminal Justice System –
  - Quicker Justice Initiative Programme
  - Reform and Transformation
- Electronic Monitoring
- Forensic Services
  - DNA Services
- Probation Services Offender Management –
  - Youth Re-Offender Programme
- Victims of Crime
  - Charter and Counselling
  - Compensation
- Legal Service Complaints

Committees:

- Advisory Committee on the Power of Pardon (Mercy Committee)

Statutory Boards and Other Bodies:

- Environmental Commission
- Equal Opportunity Commission
- Equal Opportunity Tribunal
- Legal Aid and Advisory Authority
- Criminal Injuries Compensation Board

== See also ==
- Justice ministry
- Ministry of Finance (Trinidad and Tobago)
- Minister of Foreign Affairs (Trinidad and Tobago)
- Ministry of Homeland Security (Trinidad and Tobago)
- Chief Justice of Trinidad and Tobago
- Politics of Trinidad and Tobago
