= Paula Gopee-Scoon =

Trinidadian politician (born 1958)

The Honourable Paula Gopee-Scoon MP
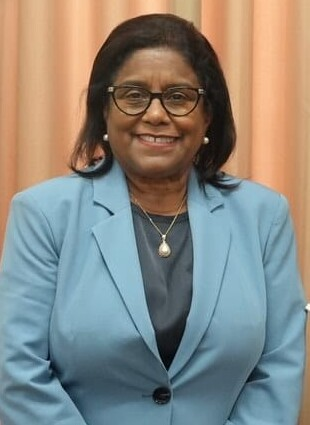
- Gopee-Scoon in 2024

Deputy Leader of the People's National Movement
- Incumbent
- Assumed office 29 June 2025
- Leader: Pennelope Beckles-Robinson
- Preceded by: Pennelope Beckles-Robinson

Minister of Trade and Industry
- In office 11 September 2015 – 1 May 2025
- Prime Minister: Keith Rowley
- Preceded by: Vasant Bharath
- Succeeded by: Kama Maharaj

Minister of Foreign Affairs
- In office 8 November 2007 – 26 May 2010
- Prime Minister: Patrick Manning
- Preceded by: Arnold Piggott
- Succeeded by: Surujrattan Rambachan

Member of Parliament for Point Fortin
- In office 5 November 2005 – 24 May 2020
- Preceded by: Lawrence Achong
- Succeeded by: Edmund Dillon

Personal details
- Born: 18 April 1958 (age 68)
- Party: PNM

Paula Gopee-Scoon (born 18 April 1958) is a Trinidad and Tobago politician. She was MP for Point Fortin in the House of Representatives and a government minister. Formerly Minister of Foreign Affairs for Trinidad and Tobago from 2007 to 2010, she was appointed the Minister of Trade and Industry on September 11, 2015. She was reappointed August 19, 2020, following the 2020 Trinidad and Tobago general election. She attended the University of the West Indies, where she received a B.Sc, and after that the University of London. She has three children, one of whom was a squash player at Princeton University.
