= Bridgid Annisette-George =

Trinidadian lawyer and politician

The Honourable Bridgid Annisette-George
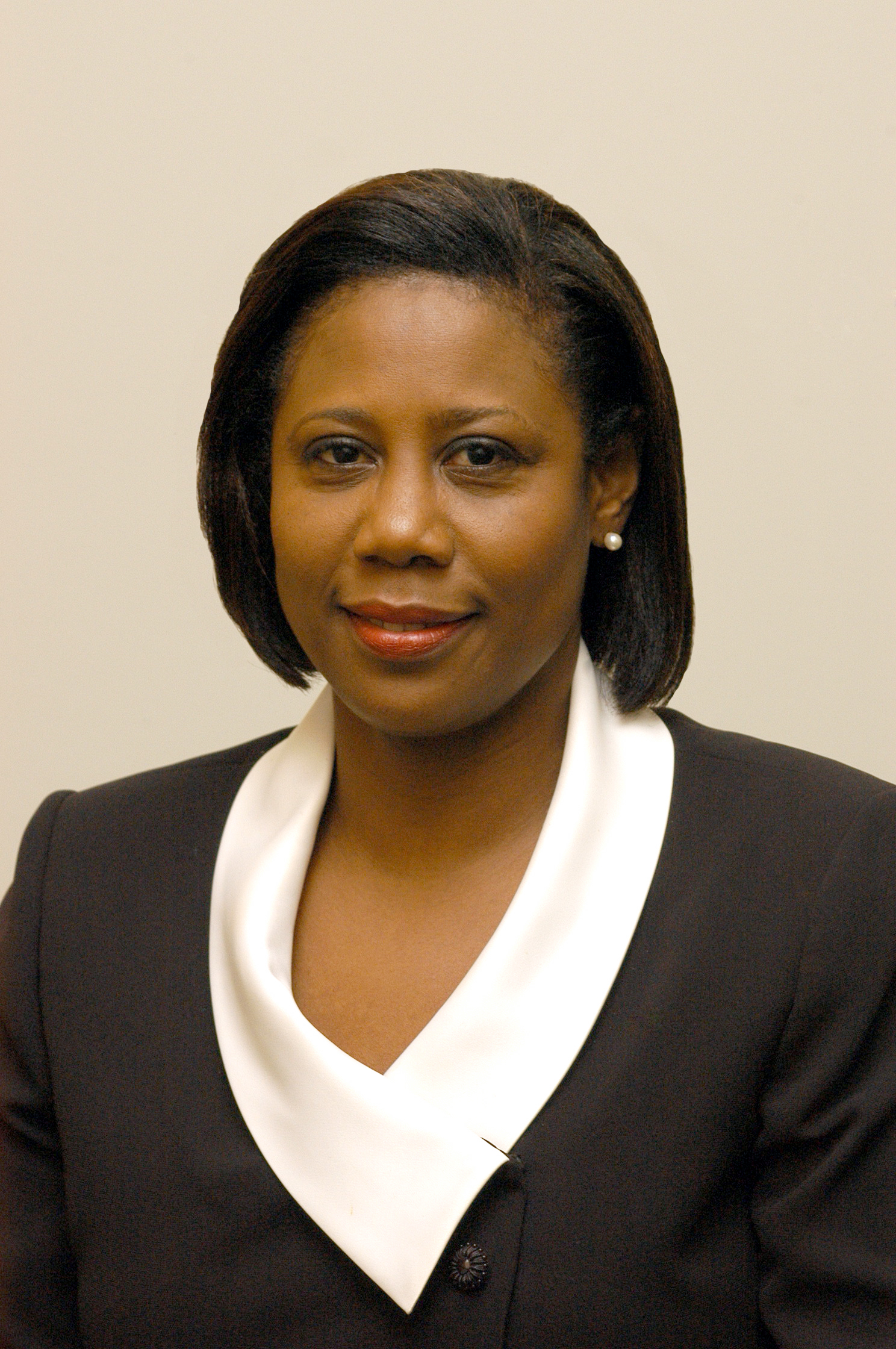
- Annisette-George in 2008

Speaker of the House of Representatives
- In office 23 September 2015 – 23 May 2025
- President: Christine Kangaloo; Paula-Mae Weekes; Anthony Carmona
- Prime Minister: Keith Rowley
- Preceded by: Wade Mark
- Succeeded by: Jagdeo Singh

Attorney General
- In office 8 November 2007 – 29 May 2009
- President: George Maxwell Richards
- Prime Minister: Patrick Manning
- Preceded by: John Jeremie
- Succeeded by: John Jeremie

Personal details
- Born: Bridgid Annisette
- Party: People's National Movement
- Education: University of the West Indies; Hugh Wooding Law School
- Profession: Lawyer; politician

Bridgid Annisette-George is a Trinidadian lawyer and politician. She was the Speaker of House of Representatives of Trinidad and Tobago in 2015–2025, and was the second woman to hold the position. By the end of her tenure, she was the world's longest serving female incumbent Speaker of a National Legislature at the time. She previously served as a Senator and the third female Attorney General of Trinidad and Tobago for the PNM before resigning to return to her private law practice.

== Biography ==
Annisette was born in Trinidad and attended St. Joseph's Convent, Port of Spain in Port of Spain and went on to study law at the University of the West Indies. She graduated with a Bachelors of Law in 1981. Annisette married Newman George, an engineer.

George became an associate tutor and lecturer at the Hugh Wooding Law School and the sole practicing attorney at the firm of Messrs. G.R. Annisette & Co. Between 1999 and 2003, George served as chair of the Diego Martin Regional Corporation and in 2003, served as a Commissioner on the Trinidad and Tobago Securities and Exchange Commission. In 2007, she was appointed as a Senator and 8 November 2007 became Attorney General, third woman of Trinidad and Tobago to hold the position. After serving eighteen months in the position, George resigned due to a conflict of interest in an ongoing investigation concerning the Colonial Life Insurance Company, as she had family members who were associated with the company. She was commended for her voluntary disclosure by colleagues and it was noted that there was no implication of involvement by George or her family members in the matter involving Colonial Life. She returned to her private practice.

In 2015, the People's National Movement won the majority in the elections and George was tapped to run for Speaker of the House. She was subsequently elected to the post.

Political offices
Preceded by John Jeremie	Attorney General; 2007-2009	Succeeded by John Jeremie
Political offices
Preceded by Wade Mark	Speaker of the House of Representatives; 2015–2025	Succeeded by Jagdeo Singh
