= Pennelope Beckles-Robinson =

Trinidadian politician (born 1961)

The Honourable Pennelope Beckles-Robinson MP
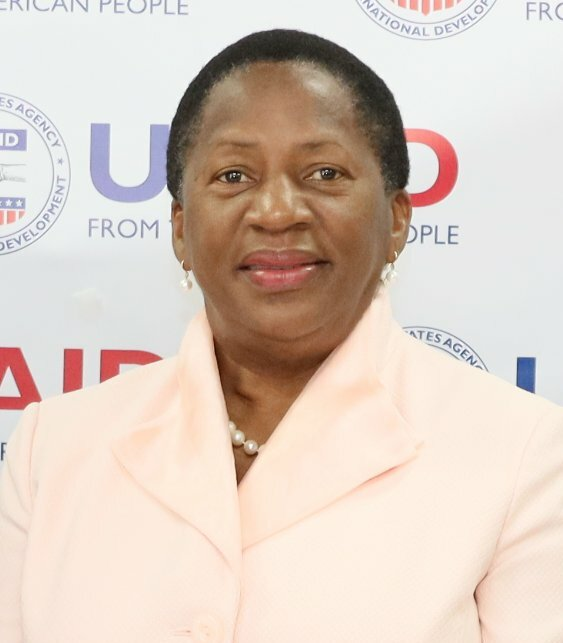
- Beckles in 2022

9th Leader of the Opposition
- Incumbent
- Assumed office 6 May 2025
- Prime Minister: Kamla Persad-Bissessar
- Preceded by: Kamla Persad-Bissessar

5th Leader of the People's National Movement
- Incumbent
- Assumed office 29 June 2025
- Deputy: Paula Gopee-Scoon
- Preceded by: Keith Rowley

Deputy Leader of the People's National Movement
- In office 17 April 2021 – 29 June 2025
- Leader: Keith Rowley; Herself (acting)
- Preceded by: Franklin Khan
- Succeeded by: Paula Gopee-Scoon

Minister of Planning and Development
- In office 16 March 2022 – 1 May 2025
- Prime Minister: Keith Rowley; Stuart Young
- Preceded by: Mariano Browne
- Succeeded by: Kennedy Swaratsingh

Minister of Housing and Urban Development
- In office 19 August 2020 – 16 March 2022
- Prime Minister: Keith Rowley
- Preceded by: Mariano Browne
- Succeeded by: Camille Robinson-Regis

Deputy Speaker of the House of Representatives
- In office 17 December 2007 – 18 June 2010
- Speaker: Barendra Sinanan

Member of Parliament for Arima
- Incumbent
- Assumed office 10 August 2020
- Preceded by: Anthony Garcia
- In office 11 December 2000 – 24 May 2010
- Preceded by: Rupert Griffith
- Succeeded by: Rodger Dominic Samuel

Personal details
- Born: Pennelope Althea Beckles; 12 September 1961 (age 65) Borde Narve Village, Trinidad and Tobago
- Party: People's National Movement
- Spouse: Noel Robinson (m. 2008)
- Nickname: Penny

Pennelope Althea Beckles-Robinson MP (née Beckles; born 12 September 1961) is a Trinidadian attorney and politician who has been the Leader of the Opposition and the Leader of the People's National Movement since 2025. She has served as a Member of Parliament (MP) in the House of Representatives for Arima since the 2020 general election. Previously she was the country's Permanent Representative to the United Nations, as well as Minister of Planning and Development.

== Early life and education ==
Beckles was born on 12 September 1961 in Borde Narve Village, three months before parliament history was created in Trinidad and Tobago growing up without electricity or running water. Her father, Lionel Beckles, worked for the Oilfields Workers' Trade Union and she has four brothers and one sister. She attended St Raphael's Grade School and St Joseph's Convent, San Fernando. She graduated from the University of the West Indies, Barbados, and the Hugh Wooding Law School.

== Career ==
Beckles has practised as an attorney since 1988, attached to the Chambers of Theodore R Guerra and Associates.

Beckles first entered parliament when she was appointed an opposition Senator for the People's National Movement (PNM) in 1995. She was then elected to the House of Representatives representing the Arima constituency in 2000, serving until 2010. She was appointed Minister for Social Development in 2001, Minister for Culture and Tourism in 2002, and Minister for Public Utilities and the Environment in 2003.

Beckles was Trinidad and Tobago's first female Deputy Speaker of the Parliament from 2007 until 2010 and served as Leader of Opposition Business from 2010 until 2013. In November 2012, she was elected lady vice-chair of the PNM, but she was dropped from the senate by party leader Keith Rowley in December 2013. In the 2014 People's National Movement leadership election, Beckles unsuccessfully challenged Rowley for the leadership of the party. On 4 February 2015, she was rejected in her bid to represent the PNM for the constituency of Arima in the 2015 general election.

Beckles was appointed Trinidad and Tobago's Permanent Representative to the UN by Prime Minister Rowley in August 2016. She postponed taking up the appointment to attend the funeral of former Prime Minister Patrick Manning in July.

She was appointed as Minister of Planning and Development on 16 March 2022 following a cabinet reshuffle.

Following the 2025 Trinidad and Tobago general election on 30 April 2025, she was selected to be Leader of the Opposition within the People's National Movement by a slim 7-6 margin. She is the PNM's first female opposition leader.

== Personal life ==
Beckles married Noel Robinson in December 2008, and she has four stepchildren. She also became the guardian of her ten-year-old niece after her sister Michelle died in 2015.

== Electoral history ==
2025 Trinidad and Tobago general election: Arima
| Party | Candidate | Votes | % | ±% |
|---|---|---|---|---|
| PNM | Pennelope Beckles-Robinson | 7,055 | 49.8% | ▼19.25 |
| UNC | Nigel Moses | 6,356 | 44.9% | ▲16.2 |
| PF | Jemima Lezama-Redhead | 520 | 3.7% | Steady |
| NTA | Shekhina Sirju | 152 | 1.1% | Steady |
| THC | Marcus Ramkissoon | 27 | 0.2% | Steady |
| NCT | Nalini Dial | 38 | 0.3% | Steady |
| Majority | | 699 | 4.9 | |
| Turnout | | 14,167 | 49.19% | |
| Registered electors | | 28,802 | | |
| PNM hold | | | | |
