= Karen Nunez-Tesheira =

Trinidad and Tobago politician

Karen Nunez-Tesheira is a Trinidad and Tobago politician and attorney. She joined the People's National Movement (PNM) in the late 1990s. She became Member of Parliament for D'Abadie/O'Meara, and was appointed the Minister of Finance of Trinidad and Tobago in Patrick Manning's cabinet in 2007. Her government was defeated by Kamla Persad-Bissessar of the UNC in the 2010 Trinidad and Tobago general election, in which Nunez-Tesheira lost her parliamentary seat.

In December 2022 Nunez-Tesheira unsuccessfully challenged Keith Rowley in an internal election for the People's National Movement leadership. In August 2023 she resigned from the PNM, declaring that "democracy is under threat" in Trinidad and Tobago.

== Works ==
- The Legal Profession in the English Speaking Caribbean. Caribbean Law Publishing Company, Jamaica, 2012.
