= Anthony Sammy =

Trinidad and Tobago politician

Anthony Sammy is a Trinidadian businessman and politician.

== Career ==
Sammy was vice-chairman of the National Alliance for Reconstruction (NAR)’s Port-of-Spain South constituency in the 1980s with then MP Theodore Guerra. In 1987 he was elected to the Port-of-Spain City Corporation as an NAR councillor. He joined the Parliament of Trinidad and Tobago as a temporary Opposition Senator, affiliated to the United National Congress, making his maiden contribution in November 2006. He served in this role until 28 September 2007.

In the 2007 general election, Sammy contested the Port of Spain South constituency for the United National Congress.

In 2010, Sammy was appointed as chairman of the Diego Martin Regional Corporation. He heads Cirkel Trinidad, an import/export firm.
