= Joan Yuille-Williams =

Trinidad and Tobago politician and diplomat

The Honourable Joan Yuille-Williams

Member of the Senate
- In office 5 April 2002 – 7 November 2007
- In office 12 January 2001 – 9 October 2001
- In office 21 July 1998 – 3 November 2000
- In office 13 January 1992 – 6 October 1995

Personal details
- Party: People's National Movement (PNM)

Joan Yuille-Williams is a Trinidad and Tobago politician. She served in the Manning Administration as Community Development minister.
