= Amery Browne =

Trinidad and Tobago politician

The Honourable Amery Browne Senator
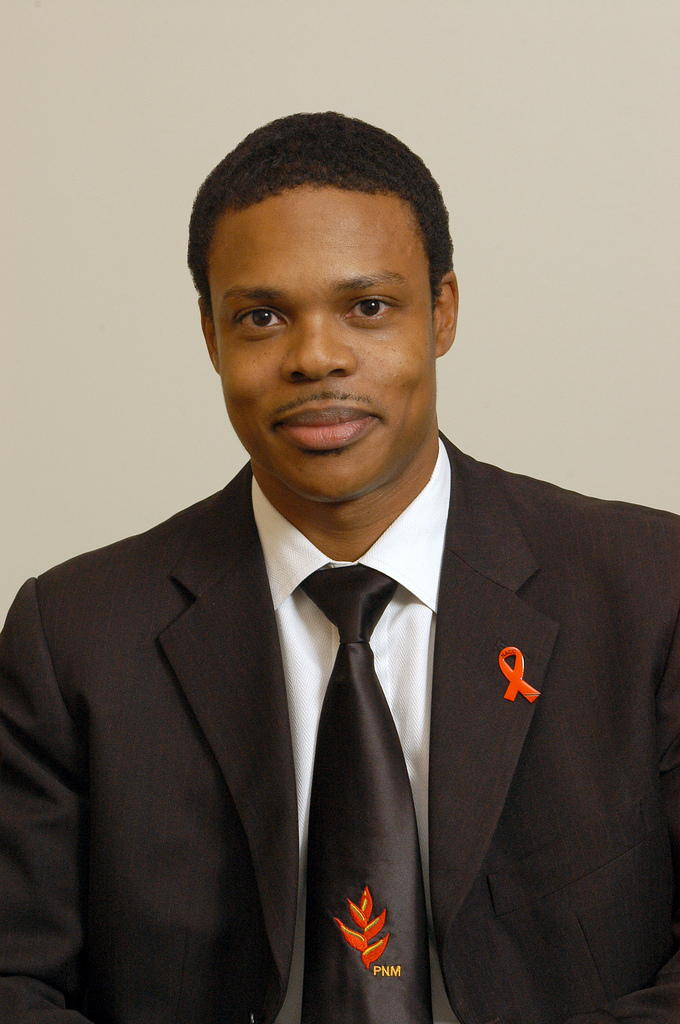

Member of the Senate of Trinidad and Tobago
- Incumbent
- Assumed office 19 August 2020

Minister of Foreign and CARICOM Affairs
- In office 9 August 2020 – 28 April 2025
- Prime Minister: Keith Rowley; Stuart Young
- Preceded by: Dennis Moses
- Succeeded by: Sean Sobers

Leader of Government Business in the Senate
- In office 2020 – 28 April 2025

Minister of Social Development
- In office 8 November 2007 – 25 May 2010

Member of Parliament for Diego Martin Central
- In office 5 November 2007 – 7 September 2015
- Preceded by: Kenneth Valley
- Succeeded by: Daryl Smith

Personal details
- Party: People's National Movement (PNM)

Amery Browne is a Trinidad and Tobago politician from the People's National Movement.

== Career ==
Browne is a medical doctor by profession. He represented Diego Martin Central in the House of Representatives between 2007 and 2015. He was social development minister in the Patrick Manning administration. In 2016 he was appointed to the Senate, where he joined the Cabinet as Minister of Foreign and CARICOM Affairs.

He was speculated as a candidate to succeed Keith Rowley in Diego Martin West in the 2025 Trinidad and Tobago general election. He withdrew his nomination in January 2025.

Browne retained his position in the senate after being reappointed by Pennelope Beckles-Robinson as one of 6 opposition Senators
