= Minister of Foreign Affairs (Trinidad and Tobago) =

The Minister of Foreign Affairs of Trinidad and Tobago is a cabinet minister in charge of the Ministry of Foreign and CARICOM Affairs of Trinidad and Tobago, responsible for conducting foreign relations of the country.

According to the Trinidad and Tobago Gazette No 81 Vol 64, the current Minister is Sean Sobers. The Minister's responsibilities are stated as

- Caribbean Community (CARICOM) Affairs
- Consular and Protocol Services
- External Relations
- Foreign Policy Matters
- Overseas Missions
- Relations with the Wider Caribbean
- Treaties

== List of foreign ministers ==
The following is a list of foreign ministers of Trinidad and Tobago since its founding in 1961:

No.	Name (Birth–Death)	Portrait	Tenure
1	Eric Williams (1911–1981)		1961–1964
2	Patrick Solomon (1910–1997)		1964–1966
(1)	Eric Williams (1911–1981)		1966–1967
3	A. N. R. Robinson (1926–2014)		1967–1970
(1)	Eric Williams (1911–1981)		1970–1971
4	Kamaluddin Mohammed (1927–2015)		1971–1973
(1)	Eric Williams (1911–1981)		1973–1975
5	Cuthbert Joseph (1927–2011)		1975–1976
6	John S. Donaldson (1936–2013)		1976–1981
7	Basil Ince (1932–2026)		1981–1985
8	Errol Mahabir (1931–2015)		1985–1986
9	Basdeo Panday (1933–2024)		1986–1988
10	Sahadeo Basdeo (b. 1945)		1988–1991
11	Ralph Maraj (b. 1949)		1991–1995
12	Knowlson Gift (b. 1935?)		1995
13	Gordon Draper (1949–2004)		1995
(11)	Ralph Maraj (b. 1949)		1995–2000
14	Mervyn Assam (b. 1938)		2000–2001
(12)	Knowlson Gift (b. 1935?)		2001–2006
15	Arnold Piggott (b. 1946?)		2006–2007
16	Paula Gopee-Scoon (b. 1958)		2007–2010
17	Surujrattan Rambachan (b. 1949)		2010–2012
18	Winston Dookeran (b. 1943)		2012–2015
19	Dennis Moses		2015–2020
20	Amery Browne		2020–2025
21	Sean Sobers		2025–present

== See also ==
- Ministry of Finance
- Chief Justice of Trinidad and Tobago
- Attorney General of Trinidad and Tobago
- Politics of Trinidad and Tobago
