= Anthony Roberts (Trinidad and Tobago politician) =

Trinidad and Tobago politician

The Honourable Anthony Roberts MP

Member of Parliament for Saint Ann's East
- In office 15 October 2002 – 8 April 2010
- Preceded by: Martin Joseph
- Succeeded by: Joanne Thomas

Personal details
- Party: People's National Movement (PNM)

Anthony Roberts is a Trinidad and Tobago politician who was a Member of Parliament of the Republic of Trinidad and Tobago from the People's National Movement (PNM).

== Career ==
Roberts was chairman of the San Juan/Laventille Regional Corporation. He was not selected as the PNM candidate in St. Ann's East at the 2007 Trinidad and Tobago general election. In 2025, the San Juan Promenade (the Croisee) was renamed the Anthony Roberts Promenade.

== See also ==
- List of Trinidad and Tobago Members of Parliament
