= Reginald Armour =

Trinidadian and Tobagonian lawyer

Reginald Armour SC

Attorney General of Trinidad and Tobago
- In office 16 March 2022 – 16 March 2025
- Prime Minister: Keith Rowley; Stuart Young
- Preceded by: Faris Al-Rawi
- Succeeded by: Camille Robinson-Regis

Justice of Appeal of the Eastern Caribbean Supreme Court (Acting)
- In office 23 March 2025 – 21 June 2025

Personal details
- Born: Dominica
- Education: University of the West Indies
- Occupation: Lawyer, judge

Reginald Armour, SC is a Trinidadian and Tobagonian lawyer who has served as Attorney General of Trinidad and Tobago from 16 March 2022 to March 2025.

== Career ==
He was named by Prime Minister Keith Rowley to replace Faris Al-Rawi. Upon his appointment, questions were asked by opposition politicians about his ability to be appointed to the Senate in light of the fact that he was born in Dominica and therefore holds Dominican citizenship. The Constitution of Trinidad and Tobago states that "No person shall be qualified to be appointed as a Senator who is a citizen of a country other than Trinidad and Tobago having become such a citizen voluntarily or is under a declaration of allegiance to such a country". However, the legal consensus is that because Armour is a Dominican citizen through birth rather than naturalization, he is eligible to be appointed to the Senate.

Before being named Attorney General, Armour served on the Eastern Caribbean Supreme Court and the Supreme Court of Trinidad and Tobago.

Reginald Armour resigned as Attorney General in March 2025. He has since been offered the post of Justice of Appeal of the Eastern Caribbean Court of Appeal.
