= Selwyn Richardson =

Trinidad and Tobago politician

Selwyn Richardson (30 November 1935 – 20 June 1995) was a lawyer, and former Attorney-General of Trinidad and Tobago.

== Background ==
After serving in the Trinidad and Tobago Police Force, Richardson left the police force and went to England to study law. Upon graduation, Richardson returned to Trinidad to practice law.

He joined the Trinidad and Tobago People's National Movement in April 1971, and in 1972 he was selected to lead the People's National Movement team on constitutional reform for Trinidad and Tobago before the Wooding Commission.

In 1973, he was appointed a director of the T&T Telephone Company. There he earned a reputation as "Mr. Fix It", with his intolerance of corrupt practices and impatience with bureaucracy.

From 1976 to 1981, he was appointed a Senator, with the portfolio of Attorney General and Minister of Legal Affairs and Leader of the Senate. In 1983, he retired from active politics and was appointed Chairman of the Airports Authority of Trinidad and Tobago from 1983 to 1986.

In 1984, for his achievements and crusading zeal in the pursuit of equity, justice earned him the Trinidad & Tobago "Individual of the Year Award". In 1986, he re-entered the political arena when he won the Ortoire/Mayaro seat and was reappointed Attorney General and Minister of Legal Affairs. As Minister of National Security in 1990, along with the then Prime Minister A. N. R. Robinson and other parliamentary colleagues, Richardson was held hostage in The Red House (parliament building), where he was shot and beaten. Although he tendered his resignation after that incident, it was not accepted by the Prime Minister.

In 1991, Richardson once again returned to private life and his law practice

In 1995, Richardson was assassinated by unknown assailants as he was entering his driveway at the end of his working day.
