= Kennedy Swaratsingh =

Trinidad and Tobago politician

The Honourable Kennedy Swaratsingh Senator

Member of the Senate
- Incumbent
- Assumed office 3 May 2025

MP for St. Joseph
- In office 8 November 2007 – 25 May 2010
- Preceded by: Gerald Yetming
- Succeeded by: Herbert Volney

Personal details
- Party: United National Congress (since 2025)
- Other political affiliations: People's National Movement (before 2025)

Kennedy Swaratsingh is a Trinidad and Tobago politician representing the United National Congress (UNC).

== Career ==
Swaratsingh was previously a Member of Parliament in the House of Representatives for the People's National Movement (PNM) and was minister of public administration in the Patrick Manning government. At the 2025 Trinidad and Tobago general election, he endorsed Kamla Persad-Bissessar. He joined the Senate as Minister of Planning, Economic Affairs and Development.
