= Carol Cuffy-Dowlat =

Trinidad and Tobago politician, attorney, and radio host

Carol Cuffy-Dowlat (1957 – 14 April 2017) was a Trinidadian politician, attorney and radio host.

She was appointed as a Government Senator for the United National Congress (UNC) in the 5th Republican Parliament in November 1995. In May 1996, she became Parliamentary Secretary in the Ministry of Housing and Settlements. Her term concluded in 2000, and in 2006 she joined the Congress of the People (COP) party, which had split from the UNC, unsuccessfully contesting two elections for the COP.

Cuffy-Dowlat died at the Eric Williams Medical Sciences Complex in Mount Hope on 14 April 2017 after a long illness.
