= Knowlson Gift =

Trinidadian politician

Knowlson Gift is a career diplomat and politician in Trinidad and Tobago. He is a member of the People's National Movement.

Gift graduated from London University College of the West Indies (UCWI) in Kingston, Jamaica with honors. He is also a graduate of the Johns Hopkins University School of Advanced International Studies (SAIS) Fellowship in Diplomacy by the Rockefeller Foundation, and a graduate of Georgetown University in Washington, D.C., from which he received a Master of Arts degree in political science.

Gift served as Minister of Foreign Affairs in 1995, 2001, and from 2002 through 2006. Prior to his appointment as Minister of Foreign Affairs, he served as Ambassador to the Republic of Guyana, Ambassador to the Republic of Haiti, Ambassador to the Dominican Republic, Ambassador to Jamaica, and Ambassador to the Republic of Venezuela. During his career he also served two four-year terms as executive director at the Inter-American Development Bank. Gift is the recipient of multiple accolades and formal recognition from several Latin American governments.
