= Esther Le Gendre =

Politician from Trinidad and Tobago

MP for Tunapuna
- In office 8 November 2007 – 25 May 2010
- Preceded by: Edward Hart
- Succeeded by: Winston Dookeran

Personal details
- Political party: People's National Movement

Esther Le Gendre is a Trinidad and Tobago politician from the People's National Movement (PNM).

== Career ==
In the Manning Administration she served as Minister of Education. In 2016, she was appointed chair of the National Information and Communication Technology Company Ltd (iGovTT).

== See also ==
- List of Trinidad and Tobago Members of Parliament
