= Borde Narve Village =

Village in Trinidad and Tobago

Coordinates: 10.2434°N 61.3932°W

Borde Narve Village is a fast-growing village centered on the Cipero Road in between San Fernando and Princes Town in Southern Trinidad. It is located in the Princes Town Regional Corporation. The village has been growing at a fast rate since 1999, thanks to its location almost equidistant from the two main towns. The village's precise population is unknown but is estimated at 1,500. The exact beginning and ends of the village have blurred and are not clear-cut. However, the towns of Lengua (to the east) and St. Johns (to the west) are adjacent to it. The village has one cricket ground located at the junction of Cipero Road and Inverness. The village also has several churches and businesses as of late. The village is represented by the Naparima District. The current Minister of Parliament is Nazim Baskh of UNC-A.

== See also ==
- List of cities and towns in Trinidad and Tobago
