= Indra Sinanan Ojah-Maharaj =

Trinidad and Tobago politician

The Honourable Indra Sinanan Ojah-Maharaj MP

Member of Parliament for Toco/Sangre Grande
- In office 2007–2010
- Succeeded by: Rupert Griffith

Personal details
- Party: People's National Movement

Indra Sinanan Ojah-Maharaj is a Trinidad and Tobago politician from the People's National Movement (PNM). She was an MP from 2007 to 2010.
