= Mustapha Abdul-Hamid (Trinidad and Tobago politician) =

Trinidad and Tobago politician

Member of the House of Representatives for Chaguanas East
- In office 5 November 2007 – 24 May 2010
- Preceded by: constituency created
- Succeeded by: Stephen Cadiz

Senator
- In office 2001–2007

Personal details
- Born: 9 June 1969 (age 57)
- Party: People's National Movement
- Education: University of the West Indies

Mustapha Abdul-Hamid (born 9 June 1969) is a Trinidad and Tobago politician from the People's National Movement.

== Career ==
He was elected MP at the 2007 Trinidad and Tobago general election for the People's National Movement. He served as a minister in the Manning Administration.

== See also ==
- List of Trinidad and Tobago Members of Parliament
