= Housing minister =

Type of lawmaker

A Housing minister is the member of a country's government typically responsible for Housing Policy.

== Country-related articles and lists ==
- Australia: Minister for Housing
  - New South Wales: Minister for Housing
  - (Victoria (state)) Victoria: Minister for Housing
  - Western Australia: Minister for Housing
- Bangladesh: Ministry of Housing and Public Works
- Canada:
  - (Canada) : Minister of Housing, Infrastructure and Communities
  - Ontario: Minister of Municipal Affairs and Housing
- Denmark: Minister for Housing
- Europe: European Commissioner for Energy and Housing
- (Republic of Ireland) Ireland: Minister for Housing, Local Government and Heritage
- Colombia: Minister of Housing, City and Territory of Colombia
- India: Minister of Housing and Urban Affairs
- Malaysia: Minister of Housing and Local Government
- The Netherlands: Ministry of Housing and Spatial Planning
- New Zealand: Minister of Housing and Urban Development
- Spain: Minister of Housing
- Sri Lanka: Minister of Housing and Construction
- Sweden: Minister for Housing
- United Kingdom:
  - England: Secretary of State for Housing, Communities and Local Government; Minister of State for Housing
  - Scotland: Cabinet Secretary for Housing
  - Wales: Minister for Housing and Local Government
- Uruguay: Minister of Housing, Territorial Planning and Environment
- Tanzania: Minister of Lands, Housing and Human Settlements Developments
- United States: United States Secretary of Housing and Urban Development

== See also ==
- Ministry of housing
