= Martin Joseph =

Trinidad and Tobago politician

Martin Joseph (c. 1950 – 5 January 2015) was a Trinidad and Tobago politician. He served as a Member of Parliament in the House of Representatives for St. Ann's East from 1995 to 2002, and then was appointed as a Government Senator in the Senate.

== Biography ==
Joseph received an associates' degree in marine sciences from the University of the District of Columbia in Washington, D.C. in the United States. He then went on to receive a bachelor of arts in geography and regional science with a minor in economics from George Washington University and a masters' of science in economics from the University of Maryland, College Park.

He served as the chairman of the Board of the Public Transport Service Corporation and as a director of the National Flour Mills Company from 1992 to 1995. He worked as an associate faculty member at Henley's Management College in the United Kingdom, and as a lecturer in strategic management at the University of the West Indies. He was a member of the House of Representatives from 1995 to 2002, representing the People's National Movement for the constituency of St. Ann's East. He was the Minister of Public Utilities and the Environment from 5 April 2002 until 9 October 2002.

Following the 2002 general election, he was appointed as a Senator. He was Minister of Housing from 10 October 2002 to 9 November 2003, and Minister of National Security from 10 November 2003 to 25 May 2010. He served as a member of the Human Resource Management Association, the Commonwealth Parliamentary Association, and the Industrial Relations Research Association in the United States.

Joseph drowned in Grange Bay of Tobago on 5 January 2015. He was 65.
