= Arnold Piggott =

Trinidadian politician

Arnold Piggott is a Trinidadian politician who served as Minister of Foreign Affairs of Trinidad and Tobago from 29 September 2006 to 7 November 2007. He has also served as "Minister of Works and Transport", "High Commissioner for the Republic of Trinidad and Tobago to Canada" and "Agriculture Minister" during his career.
