= Glenda Morean-Phillip =

Politician from Trinidad and Tobago

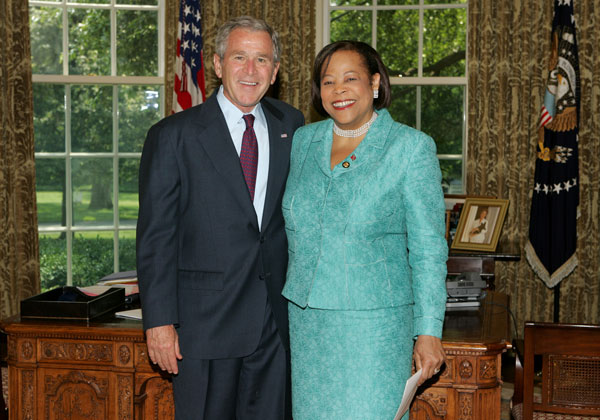
Ambassador Morean-Phillip stands with United States President Bush, 2008.

Senator the Honourable Glenda Patricia Morean-Phillip is a Trinidad and Tobago politician who has served as a senator, Attorney General, Judge of the Supreme Court, and Ambassador to the United States and Mexico.

== Early life and education ==
Morean-Phillip earned a Master of Laws degree from the University of London in 1974.

== Career ==
Morean-Phillip was the first Trinidad-born woman to qualify as a solicitor. She was head of her own private practice law firm from 1974 to 2001. In 1989, she became the President of the Law Association of Trinidad and Tobago, the first woman to hold the position. She also served as a member of the Disciplinary Committee of the Law Association. From 1987 to 2001, she was a faculty member of the Hugh Wooding Law School.

From 1999 to 2000, Morean-Phillip acted as a Judge of the Supreme Court of Trinidad and Tobago.

Morean-Phillip served as Opposition Senator during the 6th Republican Parliament (January 12, 2001 to October 9, 2001) and as Attorney General during the 7th and 8th Republican Parliaments (from December 26, 2001 to November 9, 2003).

From November 2003 to April 2008, Morean-Phillip served as high commissioner for Trinidad and Tobago. She completed this role in London, and was accredited to Germany, Sweden, Finland, Norway, Denmark, the United Kingdom, and Ireland.

Beginning April 21st, 2008, Morean-Phillip served as Ambassador of Trinidad and Tobago to the United States and Mexico, and permanent representative to the Organization of American States.

== Board Positions ==
- Chairperson of the Nursing Commission (1980-1981)
- Commissioner of the Public Utilities Commission (1981-1986)
- Deputy Chairperson of the Airports Authority of Trinidad and Tobago (1993-1996)
- Honorary President of the Blind Welfare Association of Trinidad and Tobago (1994-?)
- President of the Tennis Association of Trinidad and Tobago (1991-1997)

== Personal life ==
Morean-Phillip has competed in Lawn Tennis both at home in Trinidad and Tobago and abroad.
