= List of prime ministers of Trinidad and Tobago =

Heads of government

Prime Minister of the Republic of Trinidad and Tobago
- Prime Ministerial Seal

- Prime Ministerial Standard

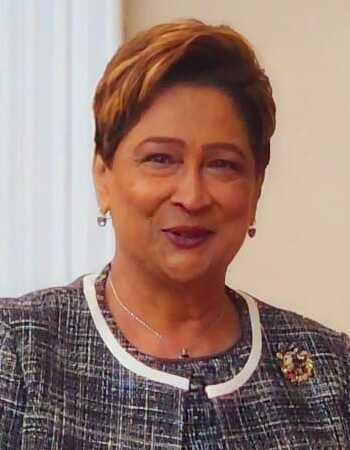
- Incumbent; Kamla Persad-Bissessar since 1 May 2025
- Style: The Honourable
- Residence: Prime Minister's Residence, La Fantasie Road, Saint Ann's, Port of Spain, Trinidad and Tobago (primary residence); Prime Minister's Residence, Blenheim, Saint George, Tobago, Trinidad and Tobago
- Seat: Whitehall, 29 Maraval Road, Saint Clair, Port of Spain, Trinidad and Tobago
- Appointer: The president of Trinidad and Tobago
- Term length: Five years, renewable
- Precursor: Premier of Trinidad and Tobago; Chief Minister of Trinidad and Tobago
- Formation: 31 August 1962; 64 years ago
- First holder: Eric Williams
- Salary: TT$576,000 annually
- Website: Official website

The prime minister of Trinidad and Tobago is the head of the executive branch of government in Trinidad and Tobago. Following a general election, which takes place every five years, the president appoints as prime minister the person who has the support of a majority in the House of Representatives; this has generally been the leader of the party which won the most seats in the election (except in the case of the 2001 general election).

The incumbent prime minister of Trinidad and Tobago is Kamla Persad-Bissessar who was sworn in on 1 May 2025 by President Christine Kangaloo.

This is a list of the prime ministers of the Republic of Trinidad and Tobago, from the establishment of the office of Chief Minister in 1950 to the present day:

== List of officeholders ==
=== Chief minister (1950–1959) ===
No.	Portrait	Name (Birth–Death)	Term of office			Political party	Elected
No.	Portrait	Name (Birth–Death)	Took office	Left office	Time in office	Political party	Elected
1		Albert Gomes (1911–1978); MP for Port of Spain North	18 September 1950	28 October 1956	6 years, 40 days	Party of Political Progress Groups	1950
2		Eric Williams (1911–1981); MP for Port of Spain South-East	28 October 1956	9 July 1959	2 years, 254 days	People's National Movement	1956

=== Premier (1959–1962) ===
No.	Portrait	Name (Birth–Death)	Term of office			Political party	Elected
No.	Portrait	Name (Birth–Death)	Took office	Left office	Time in office	Political party	Elected
1		Eric Williams (1911–1981); MP for Port of Spain South-East, later Port of Spain South (Note: as MP for Port of Spain South-East until 1961, and then as MP for Port of Spain South from 1961 until his death.)	9 July 1959	31 August 1962	3 years, 53 days	People's National Movement	—
1		Eric Williams (1911–1981); MP for Port of Spain South-East, later Port of Spain South	9 July 1959	31 August 1962	3 years, 53 days	People's National Movement	1961

=== Prime minister (1962–present) ===
No.	Portrait	Name (Birth–Death)	Term of office			Political party	Elected	Government
No.	Portrait	Name (Birth–Death)	Took office	Left office	Time in office	Political party	Elected	Government
1		Eric Williams (1911–1981); MP for Port of Spain South	31 August 1962	29 March 1981^{[†]}	18 years, 210 days	People's National Movement	—	Williams I
1		Eric Williams (1911–1981); MP for Port of Spain South	31 August 1962	29 March 1981^{[†]}	18 years, 210 days	People's National Movement	1966	Williams I
1		Eric Williams (1911–1981); MP for Port of Spain South	31 August 1962	29 March 1981^{[†]}	18 years, 210 days	People's National Movement	1971	Williams II
1		Eric Williams (1911–1981); MP for Port of Spain South	31 August 1962	29 March 1981^{[†]}	18 years, 210 days	People's National Movement	1976	Williams III
2		George Chambers (1928–1997); MP for St. Ann's East	30 March 1981	18 December 1986	5 years, 263 days	People's National Movement	1981	Chambers
3		A. N. R. Robinson (1926–2014); MP for Tobago East	19 December 1986	17 December 1991	4 years, 363 days	National Alliance for Reconstruction	1986	Robinson
4		Patrick Manning (1946–2016); MP for San Fernando East	17 December 1991	9 November 1995	3 years, 327 days	People's National Movement	1991	Manning I
5		Basdeo Panday (1933–2024); MP for Couva North	9 November 1995	24 December 2001	6 years, 45 days	United National Congress	1995	Panday–Robinson
5		Basdeo Panday (1933–2024); MP for Couva North	9 November 1995	24 December 2001	6 years, 45 days	United National Congress	2000	Panday II
(4)		Patrick Manning (1946–2016); MP for San Fernando East	24 December 2001	26 May 2010	8 years, 153 days	People's National Movement	2001	Manning II
(4)		Patrick Manning (1946–2016); MP for San Fernando East	24 December 2001	26 May 2010	8 years, 153 days	People's National Movement	2002	Manning III
(4)		Patrick Manning (1946–2016); MP for San Fernando East	24 December 2001	26 May 2010	8 years, 153 days	People's National Movement	2007	Manning IV
6		Kamla Persad-Bissessar (born 1952); MP for Siparia	26 May 2010	9 September 2015	5 years, 106 days	United National Congress	2010	Persad-Bissessar
7		Keith Rowley (born 1949); MP for Diego Martin West	9 September 2015	17 March 2025	9 years, 189 days	People's National Movement	2015	Rowley
7		Keith Rowley (born 1949); MP for Diego Martin West	9 September 2015	17 March 2025	9 years, 189 days	People's National Movement	2020	Rowley II
8		Stuart Young (born 1975); MP for Port-of-Spain North/St. Ann's West	17 March 2025	1 May 2025	45 days	People's National Movement	—	Young
(6)		Kamla Persad-Bissessar (born 1952); MP for Siparia	1 May 2025	Incumbent	1 year, 172 days	United National Congress	2025	Persad-Bissessar II

== See also ==
- Politics of Trinidad and Tobago
- List of governors of Trinidad and Tobago
- President of Trinidad and Tobago
  - List of heads of state of Trinidad and Tobago
- Leader of the Opposition (Trinidad and Tobago)
- Lists of office-holders

== Notes ==
- ^† Died in office
