= Kamla Persad-Bissessar =

Prime Minister of Trinidad and Tobago (2010–2015; 2025–present)

The Honourable Kamla Persad-Bissessar SC MP
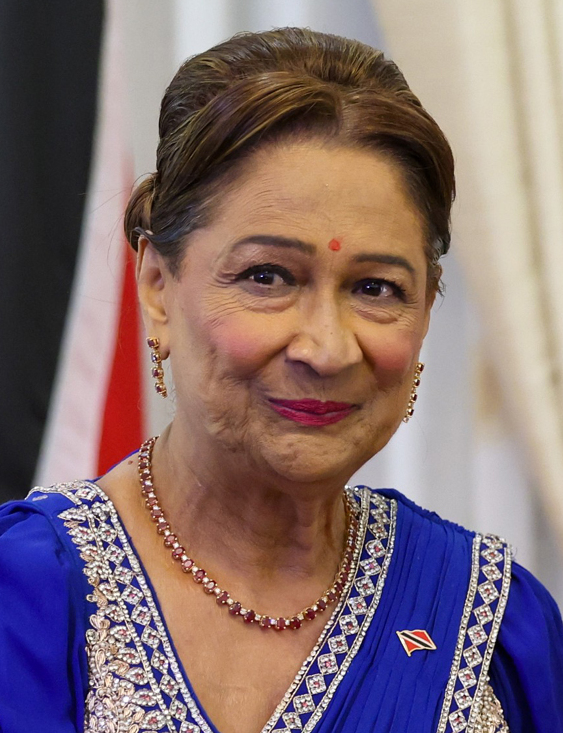
- Persad-Bissessar in 2025

6th Prime Minister of Trinidad and Tobago
- Incumbent
- Assumed office 1 May 2025
- President: Christine Kangaloo
- Preceded by: Stuart Young
- In office 26 May 2010 – 9 September 2015
- President: George Maxwell Richards; Anthony Carmona
- Preceded by: Patrick Manning
- Succeeded by: Keith Rowley

3rd Political Leader of the United National Congress
- Incumbent
- Assumed office 24 January 2010
- Preceded by: Basdeo Panday
Senior political offices
7th Leader of the Opposition of Trinidad and Tobago
In office 9 September 2015 – 1 May 2025
Prime Minister	Keith Rowley; Stuart Young
Preceded by	Keith Rowley
Succeeded by	Pennelope Beckles-Robinson
In office 25 February 2010 – 26 May 2010
Prime Minister	Patrick Manning
Preceded by	Basdeo Panday
Succeeded by	Keith Rowley
In office 26 April 2006 – 8 November 2007
Prime Minister	Patrick Manning
Preceded by	Basdeo Panday
Succeeded by	Basdeo Panday
Ministerial offices
Attorney General of Trinidad and Tobago
In office 5 October 2001 – 24 December 2001
Prime Minister	Basdeo Panday
Preceded by	Ramesh Maharaj
Succeeded by	Glenda Morean
In office 27 November 1995 – 2 February 1996
Prime Minister	Basdeo Panday
Preceded by	Keith Sobion
Succeeded by	Ramesh Maharaj
Minister of Education of Trinidad and Tobago
In office 22 October 1999 – 4 October 2001
Prime Minister	Basdeo Panday
Preceded by	Adesh Nanan
Succeeded by	Ganga Singh
Parliamentary offices
Member of Parliament for Siparia
Incumbent
Assumed office 6 November 1995
Preceded by	Sahid Hosein
Member of the Senate of Trinidad and Tobago
In office 1 November 1994 – 6 October 1995
International offices held
7th Commonwealth Chair-in-Office
In office 26 May 2010 – 28 October 2011
Secretary-General	Kamalesh Sharma
Preceded by	Patrick Manning
Succeeded by	Julia Gillard
Chairwoman of the Caribbean Community
In office 1 July 2013 – 31 December 2013
Preceded by	Michel Martelly
Succeeded by	Ralph Gonsalves

Personal details
- Born: Kamla Susheila Persad; 22 April 1952 (age 74) Siparia, Trinidad and Tobago
- Party: United National Congress (since 1994)
- Other political affiliations: National Alliance for Reconstruction (1987–1994)
- Spouse: Gregory Bissessar (m. 1971)
- Children: 1
- Education: University of the West Indies (BA, DipEd, LLB, EMBA); Hugh Wooding Law School (LEC); Norwood Technical College
- Occupation: Lawyer; Politician; Educator
- Awards: Pravasi Bharatiya Samman (2012)
- Nickname(s): Aunty or Tanty Kams; Mother of the Nation; Mowsie (transl. maternal aunt in Trinidadian Hindustani)

Kamla Susheila Persad-Bissessar (Note: [kəmlɑː prəsɑːd̪-biseːsər],) (née Persad; born 22 April 1952), often referred to by her initials KPB, is a Trinidadian politician, lawyer, and educator who has twice served as the prime minister of Trinidad and Tobago, from 2010 to 2015 and since May 2025. She has also been the Political Leader of the United National Congress since 2010, and was the Leader of the Opposition three times, from 2006 to 2007, January to May 2010, and from 2015 to 2025. Persad-Bissessar is the second prime minister to have served non-consecutive terms, after Patrick Manning.

Persad-Bissessar was the country's first female prime minister, attorney general, and opposition leader, the first woman to chair the Commonwealth of Nations and the first woman of Indian origin to be a prime minister of a country outside of India and the wider subcontinent.

Persad-Bissessar became the Political Leader of the United National Congress in 2010. After her party lost the 2015 general elections, she served as Leader of the Opposition. After leading the UNC and its Coalition of Interests to victory in the 2025 general elections, she was again sworn in as prime minister on 1 May 2025.

In 2011, Persad-Bissessar was named the thirteenth most influential female leader around the world by Time magazine.

== Early life and family ==
Kamla Susheila Persad was born in rural Siparia in southern Trinidad to Lilraj and Rita Persad, both Hindus of Indian descent. Her father was a bookkeeper and worked in the accounting department of Texaco, while her mother was a maid and labourer in the cocoa fields, who later owned and operated a roti shop. Persad-Bissessar had one brother and three sisters; her brother and eldest sister are deceased. Her sister Vidwatie Newton resides in London and her other sister Sally Ahmad resides in New York City.

Her paternal grandparents were Soomintra Persad (née Gopaulsingh) and Choranji Persad, and her maternal grandparents were Rookmin and Ramprit. Her paternal grandfather, Choranji, was a rice farmer and an active sugar union member who would help her in her studies as a child. He would have union meeting at their home and would fight for better pay for sugarcane workers, which her relatives say, had instilled a sense of social consciousness into her. Her paternal grandmother, Soomintra, was a market seller who was a founding member of the Saraswati Prakash Mandir, a Hindu temple at Boodoo Trace in Penal, and she had organized a ladies Indian singing and Hindu prayer group, as well as being an elder counsellor who helped those in need. Her maternal grandmother, Rookmin, and her maternal great-grandmother, Sumaria, were both laborers in the sugarcane and cocoa fields and both had to become the breadwinners to support their families after their husbands died at young ages. Persad-Bissessar has credited her mother, grandmothers, and great-grandmother as setting examples for her in feminism and paving the way for her.

She was born into a Brahmin Hindu Indian family; her ancestors emigrated in the 1880s from India to Trinidad through the Indian indenture system. Her maternal great-grandparents (her maternal grandmother's parents), Sumaria and Seepersad, were from India. Sumaria had left India from the Madras Port. Her paternal great-grandparents (her paternal grandfather's parents) were Pundit Ram Lakhan Mishra, son of Pundit Bhawani Swaroop Mishra, and Ganga Mishra from India. Pundit Ram Lakhan Mishra was from Bhelupur in modern day Bihar. Pundit Ram Lakhan left India from the Port of Calcutta aboard the ship Volga and landed in Trinidad on 21 October 1889. After indentureship, Pundit Ram Lakhan and Ganga Mishra had settled at Boodoo Trace in the town of Penal in southern Trinidad. In 2012, Persad-Bissessar visited her paternal great-grandfather's village on a state visit to India. In 2025 when Narendra Modi, the prime minister of India, made a state visit to Trinidad and Tobago, he referred to Persad-Bissessar as Bihar ki beti (transl. "daughter of Bihar").

== Education ==
Persad-Bissessar spent her early childhood living in a joint family with her parents and paternal grandparents at Boodoo Trace in Penal, where she attended the Mohess Road Hindu School. In 1959, at the age of seven, her family moved to Siparia, where she attended the Erin Road Presbyterian Primary School, and later the Siparia Union Presbyterian Primary School. In 1963, she was accepted to Iere High School in Siparia, a new co-ed school at the time. While attending Irere, she was a top debating student, champion badminton and netball player, and she excelled in her classes and was placed in special classes to write the GCE O Levels in 1966. She graduated in 1969.

When Persad-Bissessar was sixteen, she wanted to go to the United Kingdom to further her studies, but her traditional father and uncles insisted she stayed in Trinidad and Tobago. However, her mother eventually convinced them to send her. Persad-Bissessar then left Trinidad at the age of seventeen, in August 1969, to attended Norwood Technical College in West Norwood, London, England. While in college in England, she worked as a social worker with the Church of England's Children's Society of London.

By the time she left Trinidad, she had already met her future husband Gregory Bisessar, and he was already in England when she was attending college. They married two years later in 1971, when she was eighteen and he was twenty-two. They later left England for Jamaica, where they spent fourteen years. In Jamaica she attended the University of the West Indies in Mona and graduated with a Bachelor of Arts (Hons.) in 1974 and a post-graduate Diploma of Education in 1976. After graduating, she taught at St Andrew High School in Kingston and at the University of the West Indies in Mona, and she was also a consultant lecturer at the Jamaica College of Insurance. She was the youngest lecturer, at the age of twenty-five, to the ever teach at the University of the West Indies. She was awarded a Fulbright Scholarship to attend Columbia University to do research leading to a PhD but she opted to study law instead. In 1985, she graduated from the University of the West Indies at Cave Hill with her Bachelor of Laws (Hons.). During her time at UWI, Cave Hill she gave birth to her son. In 1987, she graduated from Hugh Wooding Law School with her Legal Education Certificate at the top of her class, with awards for being the most outstanding student and having the best overall performance. In 2006, she obtained an Executive Masters in Business Administration from the University of West Indies Arthur Lok Jack Graduate School of Business in San Juan, Trinidad and Tobago.

== Political career ==
In 1987, Persad-Bissessar entered politics serving as an alderwoman on the Saint Patrick County Council until 1991. She then became an opposition senator from 1994 until 1995. Persad-Bissessar then became a Member of Parliament for the Siparia constituency in 1995 and has been ever since. She served as Attorney General in 1995 until Ramesh Maharaj was able to disassociate himself from ongoing cases and again in 2001 after Maharaj left the party. When the UNC formed Government on 22 December 2000, she was sworn in as the Minister of Education.

On 25 April 2006, she received the support of the majority of Opposition MPs for the post of Leader of the Opposition. The position of Leader of the Opposition was declared vacant by President George Maxwell Richards after Basdeo Panday was convicted of failing to make an accurate declaration to the Integrity Commission concerning a bank account held in London. Persad-Bissessar was subsequently appointed Leader of the Opposition on 26 April 2006.

=== Political leader ===
On 24 January 2010, Kamla Persad-Bissessar was elected political leader of the UNC, emerging victorious over the party's founder and former prime minister, Basdeo Panday. She was formally appointed opposition leader on 25 February 2010, having gained the support of a majority of UNC MPs, as well as women leaders such as Tara Ramoutar of the Caribbean Association for Feminist Research and Action.

=== Prime minister ===
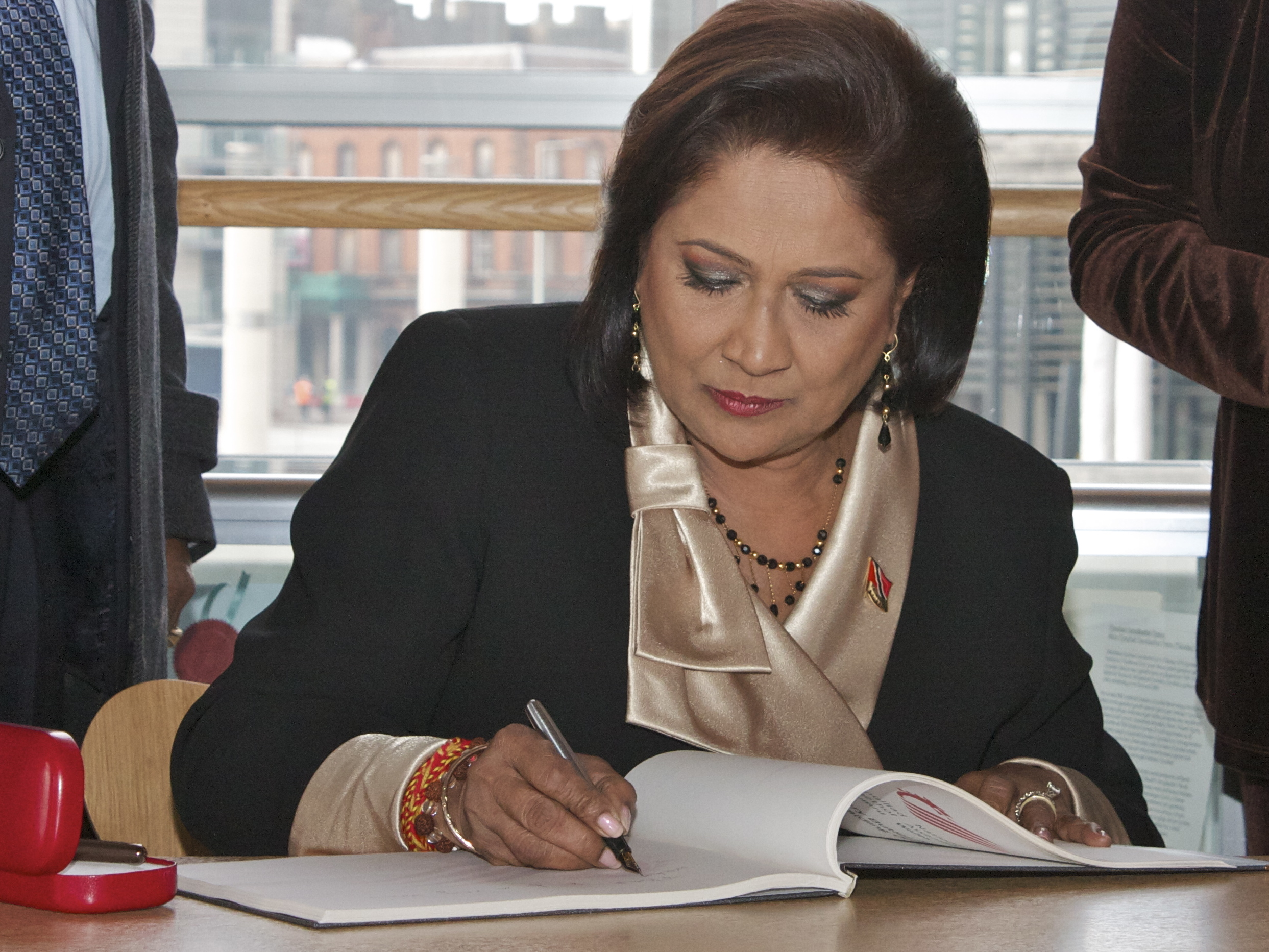
Persad-Bissessar; March 2011

Persad-Bissessar took office as prime minister after the victory of the People's Partnership in the general election of 24 May 2010, defeating the previous government of the People's National Movement, which had called an early election. Her election campaign has been analysed as a successful attempt to bring together people with different ethnic backgrounds and ideological affiliations under female leadership. She was the first female prime minister of Trinidad and Tobago and is also the first female Commonwealth Chairperson-in-Office. She was succeeded as Chairperson-in-Office by Julia Gillard with the opening of the 2011 CHOGM on 28 October 2011.

=== Leader of the Opposition ===
On 21 September 2015, Persad-Bissessar was appointed leader of the opposition by President Anthony Carmona after her party was defeated at the polls, following the 7 September 2015 general elections. The People's National Movement led by Keith Rowley secured 23 out of 41 seats to form the government, while the People's Partnership coalition led by Persad-Bissessar secured 18 out of the 41 seats in the House of Representatives to form the opposition. In the 2020 general election, the People's National Movement won re-election and Persad-Bissessar remained the Leader of the Opposition. However, the United National Congress did pick up two more seats than previously held.

=== 2nd term as Prime Minister ===
Having been the leader of her party for fifteen years, she led her party into the 2025 Trinidad and Tobago general election with the Coalition of Interests. She declared a landslide victory and became the prime minister-elect on 28 April 2025 with the UNC winning an estimated 26 of the 41 seats in the House of Representatives. Persad-Bissessar campaigned on increasing public sector salaries, protecting pensions and reopening the state oil company Petrotrin. She was sworn in as prime minister on 1 May. Her 2nd term has been marked by an increase of tensions between Trinidad and Tobago and neighbouring Venezuela. On 27 October she accused Caricom of siding with Venezuela against the United States in the 2025 United States naval deployment in the Caribbean. On 28 October the President of Venezuela Nicolás Maduro declared her as persona non grata, she responded by stating "Why would they think I would want to go to Venezuela?"

Persad-Bissessar, U.S. President Trump, Salvadoran President Bukele, Chilean President Kast, and other leaders at the Shield of the Americas summit in Florida, March 2026

Persad-Bissessar supported the American and Israeli strikes on Iran in February–March 2026 which resulted in the assassination of Iran's Supreme Leader Ali Khamenei.

Prime Minister Persad-Bissessar gave her official written statement for African Emancipation Day 2026 (marking the 188th anniversary of the abolition of slavery). She described the transatlantic slave trade as "one of history's greatest crimes against humanity" and praised the unbreakable spirit and determination of enslaved Africans. She also highlighted how descendants of enslaved Africans have enriched every sector of Trinidad and Tobago's society—including music, literature, education, science, public service, and sport. She noted that freedom is not merely inherited but must be protected and strengthened by every generation through building a nation founded on justice, equality, and opportunity.

== Awards and honours ==
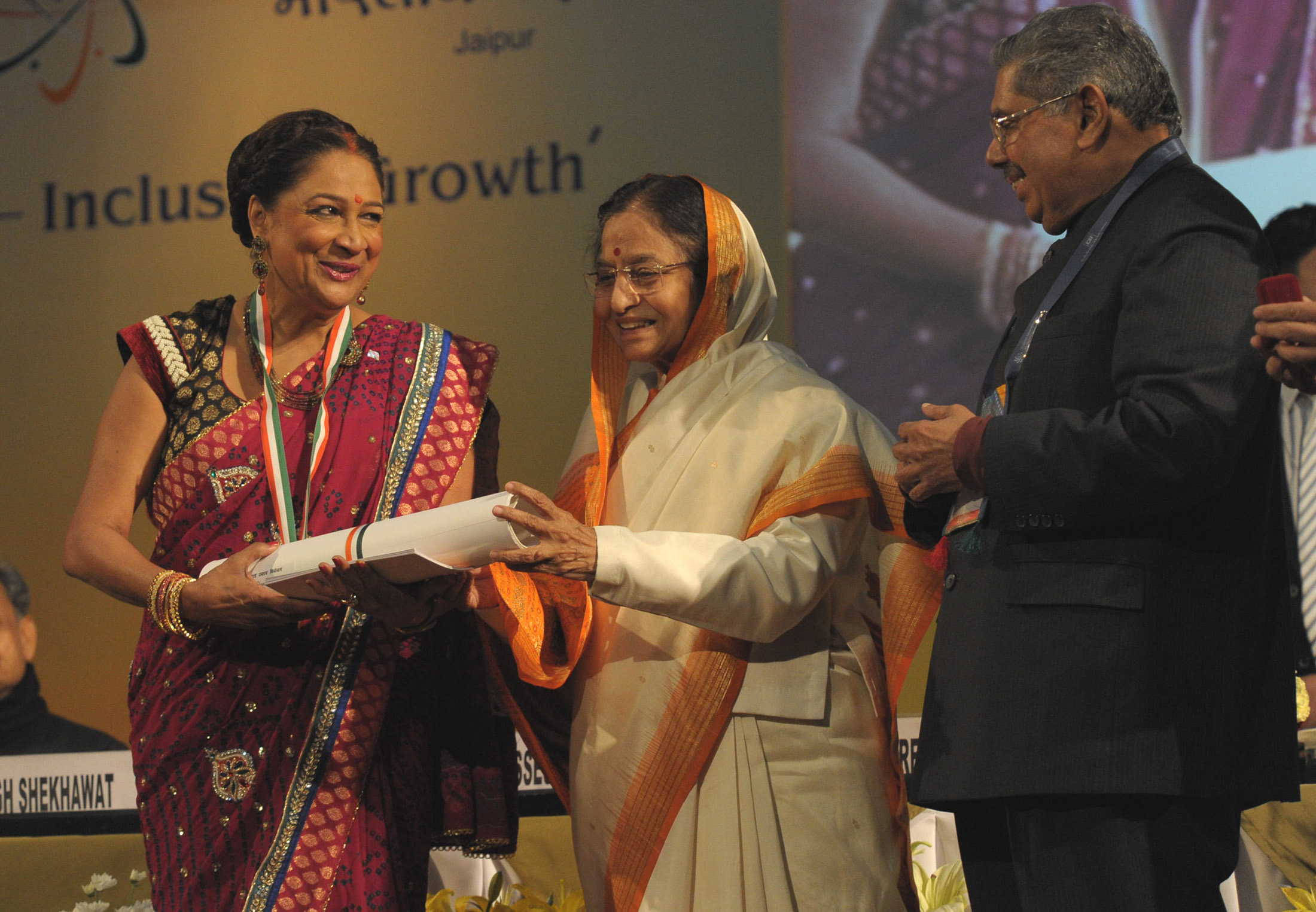
Kamla (left) receives the Pravasi Bharatiya Samman from Pratibha Patil, the President of India.

Year	Country	Ribbon	Award	Given by	Field of Merit
2012	India		Pravasi Bharatiya Samman	President of India	Public Services

== Personal life ==
Persad-Bissessar married Gregory Bissessar in 1971. They had met each other as teenagers and were both international students in the United Kingdom together. They have one son, Kris Shiva Bissessar, who was an educator and later became an attorney. They have a grandson, Shiva Kristiano, and a granddaughter, Kavita Sofie, who has autism, which Persad-Bissessar has been very vocal about in her support for causes for special needs children. She and her husband have resided in Phillipine, Penal-Debe, Trinidad and Tobago. She is a grandmother of two and has described herself as an adherent of both Hinduism and the Spiritual Baptist faith. She raised her brother's children after he died in a car accident. Her uncle (her father’s first cousin) is Pundit Ramnarace Persad and her cousin is the late Pundit Mohindra Persad of Penal.

== Electoral history ==
2025 Trinidad and Tobago general election: Siparia
Party	Candidate	Votes	%	±%
UNC	Kamla Persad-Bissessar	13,900	83.0%	▲
PNM	Natasha Mohammed	2,412	14.4%	▼
PF	Judy Sookdeo	374	2.2%	Steady
Majority		11,488	68.6%	
Turnout		16,740	57.53%	
Registered electors		29,096		
UNC hold		Swing	%	

== Notes ==
Political offices
Preceded by Basdeo Panday	Leader of the Opposition; 2006–2007	Succeeded by Basdeo Panday
Preceded by Basdeo Panday	Leader of the Opposition; 2010	Succeeded by Keith Rowley
Preceded by Patrick Manning	Prime Minister of Trinidad and Tobago; 2010–2015	Succeeded by Keith Rowley
Preceded by Keith Rowley	Leader of the Opposition; 2015–2025	Succeeded by Pennelope Beckles-Robinson
Preceded by Stuart Young	Prime Minister of Trinidad and Tobago; 2025–present	Incumbent
Party political offices
Preceded by Basdeo Panday	Leader of the United National Congress (UNC); 2010–present	Incumbent
Diplomatic posts
Preceded by Patrick Manning	Chair of the Commonwealth of Nations; 2010–2011	Succeeded by Julia Gillard
