= Patrick Manning =

Prime Minister of Trinidad and Tobago (1991–1995, 2001–2010)

The Honourable Patrick Manning
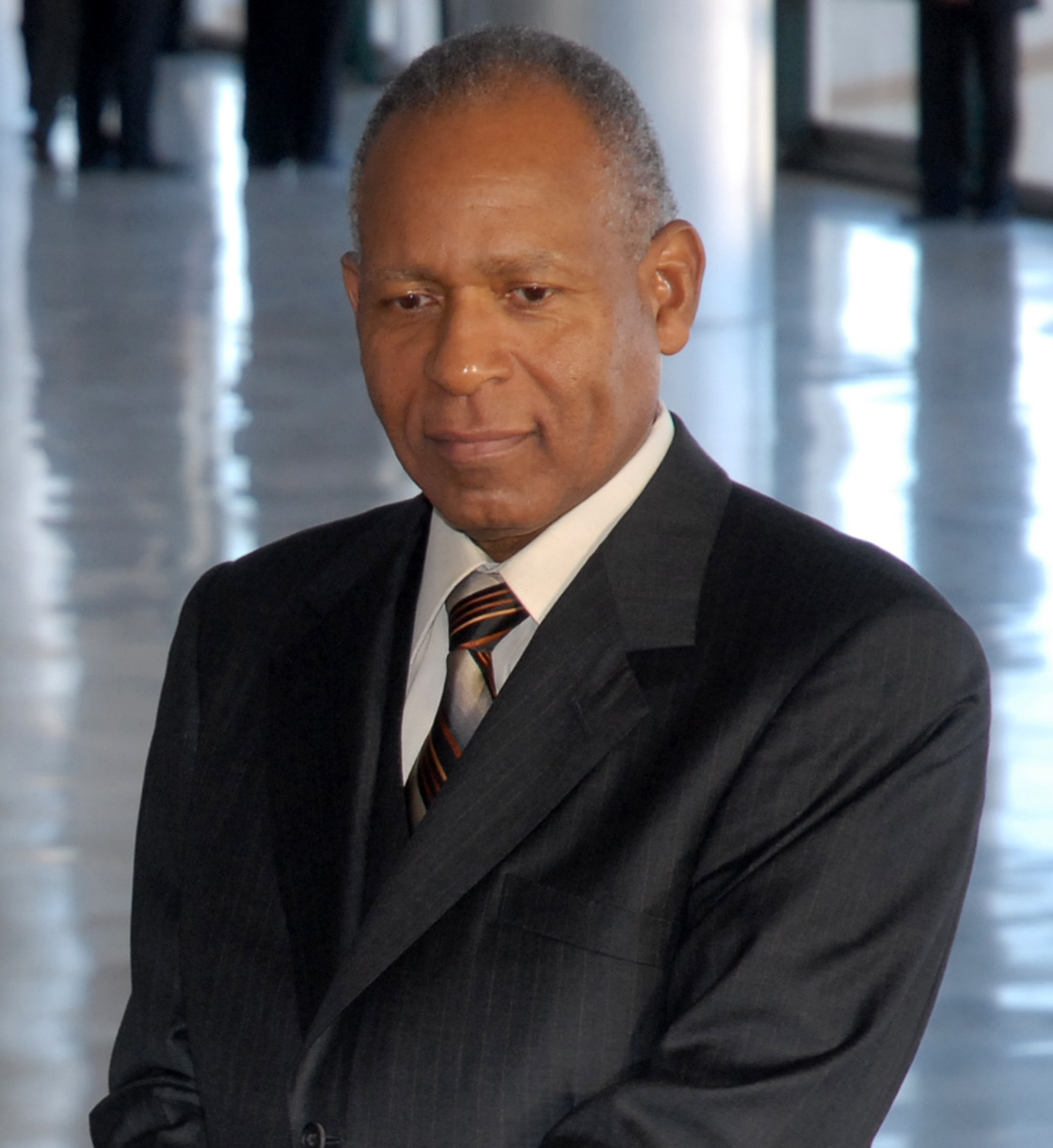
- Manning in 2008

4th Prime Minister of Trinidad and Tobago
- In office 24 December 2001 – 26 May 2010
- President: A. N. R. Robinson; George Maxwell Richards
- Preceded by: Basdeo Panday
- Succeeded by: Kamla Persad-Bissessar
- In office 17 December 1991 – 9 November 1995
- President: Noor Hassanali
- Preceded by: A. N. R. Robinson
- Succeeded by: Basdeo Panday

6th Leader of the Opposition
- In office 9 November 1995 – 24 December 2001
- Prime Minister: Basdeo Panday
- Preceded by: Basdeo Panday
- Succeeded by: Basdeo Panday
- In office 18 December 1986 – 17 December 1991
- Prime Minister: A. N. R. Robinson
- Preceded by: Basdeo Panday
- Succeeded by: Basdeo Panday

3rd Leader of the Political National Movement
- In office 8 February 1987 – 26 May 2010
- Deputy: Keith Rowley; Joan Yuille-Williams
- Preceded by: George Chambers
- Succeeded by: Keith Rowley

Member of Parliament for San Fernando East
- In office 13 September 1976 – 7 September 2015
- Preceded by: Albert Gerard Monteno
- Succeeded by: Randall Mitchell

Personal details
- Born: Patrick Augustus Mervyn Manning; 17 August 1946 San Fernando, Trinidad and Tobago
- Died: 2 July 2016 (aged 69) San Fernando, Trinidad and Tobago
- Party: PNM
- Spouse: Hazel Manning (m. 1972)
- Children: Brian
- Education: University of the West Indies

Patrick Augustus Mervyn Manning (17 August 1946 – 2 July 2016) was a Trinidadian politician who served as the fourth prime minister of Trinidad and Tobago twice from 1991 to 1995, and again from 2001 to 2010. A geologist by training, Manning served as Member of Parliament for the San Fernando East constituency from 1971 until 2015 when he was replaced by Randall Mitchell, but with the seat in 2020 being won by his son Brian Manning. Patrick Manning was the longest-serving member of the House of Representatives. He was the Leader of the Opposition from 1986 to 1990 and again from 1995 to 2001.

Manning was born in San Fernando and received his secondary education at Presentation College, San Fernando, and his bachelor's degree from the University of the West Indies at Mona, in 1969. After graduation, he returned to Trinidad, where he worked as a geologist for Texaco.

== Life ==
=== Early career ===
After graduating from the University of the West Indies, Manning worked as a geologist with Texaco Trinidad Ltd., until he ran for Parliament in 1971. Between 1971 and 1978 he served as Parliamentary Secretary in various Ministries before being appointed junior Minister in the Ministry of Finance in the government of Eric Williams. In 1979 he was given the additional position of junior Minister in the Office of the Prime Minister. In 1981 he was given a full Cabinet position of Minister of Information and Minister of Industry and Commerce. Between 1981 and 1986 he served as Minister of Energy and Natural Resources.

The 1986 general elections saw the ruling PNM suffer an almost total defeat. Only three candidates won their seats; the prime minister, George Chambers, was among the losing candidates. As one of the three successful PNM candidates, Manning was appointed Leader of the Opposition. In 1987, he was elected political leader of the PNM, the youngest the party has seen at only 40 years old. A split in the ruling National Alliance for Reconstruction in 1988 left the PNM as the minority Opposition party, and, in 1990, Basdeo Panday requested that he be appointed Leader of the Opposition.

=== First term as prime minister ===
Manning led the PNM to victory in the 1991 general elections, and became prime minister.

In 1995, Manning called a general election one full year before it was constitutionally due. In this election both the PNM and the UNC won 17 seats each and the NAR won 2 seats. The UNC and the NAR united in a coalition and formed the government; Basdeo Panday replaced Manning as prime minister.

=== Opposition leader ===
Manning served as Leader of the Opposition once again, also losing the 2000 elections. The 2001 elections ended in a tie, with both the Opposition PNM and the governing United National Congress winning 18 seats. President A. N. R. Robinson appointed Manning as prime minister. In addition to prime ministership, Manning was also Minister of Finance from 2001 to 2007.

=== Second term as prime minister ===
Unable to elect a Speaker of the House of Representatives, Manning proceeded to rule without Parliament until the need to pass a Budget forced him to call elections in October 2002. His party won this election with 20 seats to 16 for the UNC and formed the new government.

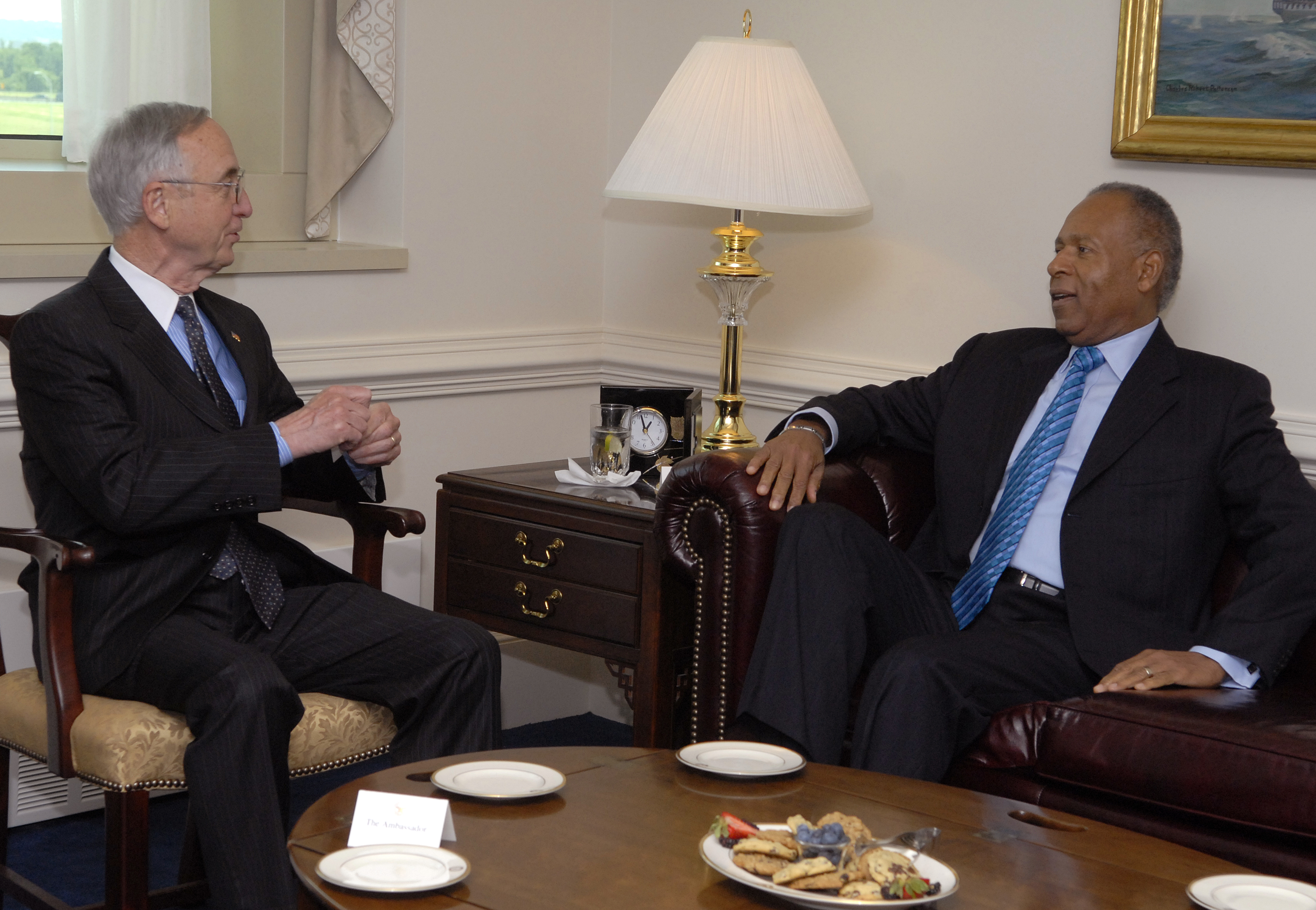
United States Deputy Secretary of Defense Gordon R. England, left, talks with Prime Minister of Trinidad and Tobago Patrick Manning during a closed-door meeting inside The Pentagon 23 June 2008.

Under the PNM administration, income taxes were substantially reduced and the Corporation Tax was reduced from 35% to 25% of profits for most companies. The Government also instituted free university education. The economy grew a pace, primarily due to high natural gas and oil prices and to significant increases in natural gas production. In September 2007, Manning received an honorary doctorate from Medgar Evers College, CUNY.

In 2007, Manning called for a general election to be held on 4 November. The PNM won this election with 26 of the 41 seats and Manning began his third term as prime minister.

Subsequently, the country experienced a slow down in the economy. Despite this the economic ratings of the country came in for high praises mainly from the Standards and Poor report on 15 August 2008 which raised Trinidad and Tobago from an "A−" to an "A". The Government of Trinidad and Tobago also hosted King Juan Carlos I and Queen Sofia of Spain on 30 November to 2 December 2008. The purpose of the visit was to strengthen the economic ties between Spain, Latin America and the Caribbean and also to open new markets and possibility for increase trading and the opening of new markets. The country also hosted two world summits in 2009: the 5th Summit of the Americas on 17 to 19 April 2009 as well as The Commonwealth Heads of Government on 27 to 29 November 2009.

The Chilean president Michelle Bachelet paid Prime Minister Manning and the Government of Trinidad and Tobago a visit in 2010. The purpose was to strengthen bilateral ties between the two countries and as a result a formal agreement was signed in an effort to unite the two countries.

Despite economic growth, crime was considered a serious problem. The number of murders increased sharply from 93 in 1999 to 509 in 2009. Additionally, 2008 saw the country's highest number of murders with 550. The Prime Minister's explanation was that the crime problem was a result of the illegal drug and arms trade. His speech at the 5th summit of the Americas points to the fact that the Caribbean is situated between the narcotic producing South American continent and the narcotic consuming North American continent. Some of his crime detection and prevention methods included the introduction of the Special Anti-Crime Unit of Trinidad and Tobago (SAUTT), two surveillance airships (commonly referred to as blimps), and the inclusion of six high speed off-shore patrol vessels for better control of the country's maritime borders and coastlines on 15 February 2010. Manning was quoted as saying that the country could expect to see a 50% decrease in crime because of this effort.

=== 2010 elections ===
On 9 April 2010 Prime Minister Manning advised President George Maxwell Richards to dissolve Parliament resulting in a general election to be held two years sooner than was constitutionally mandated. Manning later announced 24 May 2010 as the date for general elections. Manning and the PNM lost the election to The People's Partnership (UNC, COP, TOP, NJAC, MSJ). Following the defeat, Manning officially resigned as Political Leader of the Party on 27 May 2010 but remained as the Parliamentary Representative for San Fernando East.

Manning was sent to the Privileges Committee following statements he made in Parliament on 19 November 2010, during a debate on the Interception of Communications Bill. Manning had made certain allegations about the private residence of Prime Minister Kamla Persad-Bissessar on the San Fernando/Siparia/Erin Road. On 24 November 2010, Speaker of the House Wade Mark ruled that a prima facie case of contempt or breach of privilege had been made out against Manning and referred the matter to the committee for consideration. Manning was accordingly suspended from the service of the House of Representatives with immediate effect on 16 May 2011, as declared by House Speaker Wade Mark. During this period, Manning wouldn't be able to represent his San Fernando East constituency in Parliament. Manning is the second Prime Minister to be suspended from the House of Representatives in Trinidad and Tobago.

=== Illness and death ===
On 24 September 2007, Manning went to Cuba for a routine medical evaluation. For many years, he had engaged in a regular exercise program. On 23 January 2012, Manning suffered a stroke.

Manning was diagnosed with acute myeloid leukemia, confirmed on 30 June 2016, and he died at 8:15 AM on 2 July 2016 at the San Fernando General Hospital, at age 69.

== "Manning Initiative(s)" ==
=== The Barbados, Guyana, Trinidad & Tobago initiative ===
In 1991 Barbados and the Co-Operative Republic of Guyana attempted moves towards forming a tri-state confederation consisting of Barbados, Guyana and Trinidad and Tobago. Manning pitched the initiative for the tri-state area to enter into some form of political union or political association. This initiative was short lived and did not proceed following the Democratic Labour Party's defeat during the 1994 elections.

=== The Trinidad & Tobago—Organisation of Eastern Caribbean States initiative ===
Party political offices
Preceded by George Chambers	Leader of the People's National Movement; 1986–2010	Succeeded by Keith Rowley
Political offices
Preceded by Basdeo Panday	Leader of the Opposition; 1986–90	Succeeded by Basdeo Panday
Preceded by Arthur Robinson	Prime Minister of Trinidad and Tobago; 1991–95	Succeeded by Basdeo Panday
Preceded by Basdeo Panday	Leader of the Opposition; 1995–2001	Succeeded by Basdeo Panday
Preceded by Basdeo Panday	Prime Minister of Trinidad and Tobago; 2001–10	Succeeded by Kamla Persad-Bissessar
Preceded by Gerald Yetming	Minister of Finance; 2001–07	Succeeded by Karen Nunez-Tesheira
Diplomatic posts
Preceded by Yoweri Museveni	Commonwealth Chairperson-in-Office; 2009–10	Succeeded by Kamla Persad-Bissessar
