= Keith Rowley =

Prime Minister of Trinidad and Tobago from 2015 to 2025

The Honourable Keith Rowley MP
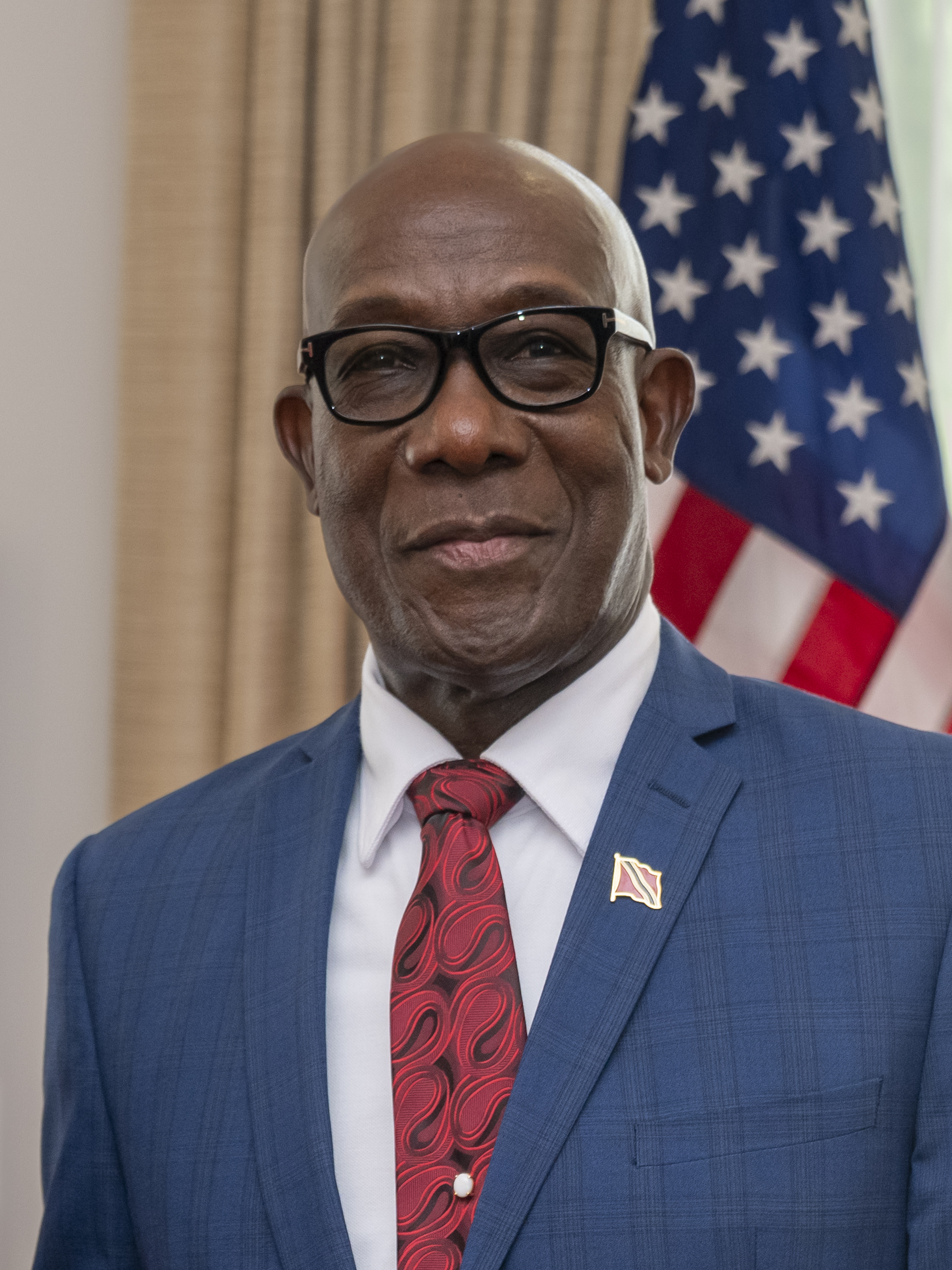
- Rowley in 2023

7th Prime Minister of Trinidad and Tobago
- In office 9 September 2015 – 17 March 2025
- President: Anthony Carmona; Paula-Mae Weekes; Christine Kangaloo
- Preceded by: Kamla Persad-Bissessar
- Succeeded by: Stuart Young

8th Leader of the Opposition
- In office 26 May 2010 – 9 September 2015
- Prime Minister: Kamla Persad-Bissessar
- Preceded by: Kamla Persad-Bissessar
- Succeeded by: Kamla Persad-Bissessar

4th Leader of the People's National Movement
- In office 26 May 2010 – 1 May 2025
- Preceded by: Patrick Manning
- Succeeded by: Pennelope Beckles-Robinson

Member of the Senate of Trinidad and Tobago
- In office 1987–1990

Chairman of the Caribbean Community
- In office 1 January 2021 – 30 June 2021
- Secretary-General: Irwin LaRocque
- Preceded by: Ralph Gonsalves
- Succeeded by: Gaston Browne

Personal details
- Born: Keith Christopher Rowley; 24 October 1949 (age 77) Saint George, Trinidad, Trinidad and Tobago
- Party: PNM
- Spouse: Sharon Rowley
- Children: 4
- Education: University of the West Indies

Keith Christopher Rowley MP (born 24 October 1949) is a Trinidadian politician who served as the seventh prime minister of Trinidad and Tobago from 2015 to 2025. He was the leader the People's National Movement (PNM) from 2010 to 2025 and was Leader of the Opposition from 2010 to 2015. He also served as the Member of the House of Representatives for Diego Martin West from 1991 to 2025. He is a volcanologist by profession, holding a doctorate in geology, specializing in geochemistry.

== Early life ==
Rowley was born in Mason Hall, Tobago, raised by his Afro-Tobagonian grandparents, who were prominent Tobago farmers. He was a pupil of Bishop's High School in Tobago, and graduated from the University of the West Indies (Mona) from where he graduated with a BSc. Geology (First Class Honors). He then went on to earn an MSc (1974) and a PhD (1978) from the University of the West Indies at St. Augustine in geology, specializing in geochemistry. At the university, as researcher, he held the positions of research fellow and later as head of the Seismic Research Unit. Rowley was general manager of state-owned National Quarries Company Limited as well.

== Political career ==
Rowley entered politics in 1981, where he unsuccessfully contested the Tobago West seat in the general election of that year. To date he has the distinction of being the only People's National Movement candidate to have contested a seat in a general election in both Tobago and Trinidad. He first served in Parliament as an Opposition Senator from 1987 to 1990 (3rd Parliament). Subsequently, he was appointed as Minister of Agriculture, Land and Marine Resources (4th Parliament), Minister of Planning and Development and Minister of Housing (as cabinet reshuffled) (8th Parliament) and Minister of Trade and Industry (9th Parliament) until he was fired by then Prime Minister Patrick Manning.

=== Leader of the Opposition ===
Following the People's National Movement's defeat in the 2010 general election, Rowley was appointed as Leader of the Opposition on the 1st June. He was then elected political leader of the People's National Movement as he was seen as the most capable to lead the party. As political leader he advocated implementation of the one man, one vote system within the party. Rowley has served on several parliamentary committees. In 2004, he chaired the Joint Select Committee of Parliament which examined and made recommendations for the live broadcasting of parliamentary debates. He served as the representative governor of Trinidad and Tobago for the Inter-American Development Bank and the Caribbean Development Bank.

== Prime minister ==
Rowley led the People's National Movement in the September 2015 general election, in which his party secured 23 out of 41 seats in the House of Representatives to form the government, defeating the previous People's Partnership coalition government. On 9 September 2015, Rowley was sworn in as Prime Minister of Trinidad and Tobago by President Anthony Carmona. He becomes the seventh Prime Minister of Trinidad and Tobago and the second Tobago-born Prime Minister. Rowley again led the People's National Movement to victory in the 2020 Trinidad and Tobago general election for a second term in government under his premiership. He was sworn in as Prime Minister of Trinidad and Tobago on 19 August by President Paula-Mae Weekes at the President's House in St. Anns after the opposition party asked for recounts to be done in marginal constituencies.

In April 2018, 82 Venezuelan asylum seekers were deported from Trinidad and Tobago, which violated international laws on the matter. Given the criticism issued by UNHCR, he says would not allow the UN or any other agency to "turn his country into a refugee camp". Venezuelan migrants in Trinidad and Tobago are victims of widespread discrimination, since unlike other countries, no refugee reception plan has been implemented on the islands so it is hard to find legal work without being sent back.

During his tenure, on 5 February 2022, the Trinidad and Tobago coast guard fired upon a vessel with Venezuelan migrants while attempting to stop it, killing a nine-month-old baby and injuring his mother. The coast guard claimed that the shots were fired "in self-defense". Rowley deemed the action "legal and appropriate"; the Trinidadian police and coast guard opened an investigation of the event.

At the PNM convention in August 2024, Rowley announced his support for the Caribbean Court of Justice to replace the Judicial Committee of the Privy Council as Trinidad and Tobago's final court of appeals. He also announced his government would legislate to remove Christopher Columbus's ships from the national coat of arms and replace them with the steelpan drum, which had been declared the official national music instrument a few months earlier. He stated that the changes would "signal that we are on our way to removing the colonial vestiges that we have in our country".

== Cabinet ==
He appointed the following people as his cabinet:

Official	Position
Faris Al-Rawi	Minister of Rural Development and Local Government
Kazim Hosein	Minister of Agriculture, Land and Fisheries
Nyan Gadsby-Dolly	Minister of Education
Stuart Young	Minister of Energy and Energy Industries
Colm Imbert	Minister of Finance
Amery Browne	Minister of Foreign and CARICOM Affairs
Terrence Deyalsingh	Minister of Health
Camille Robinson-Regis	Minister of Housing and Urban Development
Stephen McClashie	Minister of Labour
Reginald Armour	Attorney General
Fitzgerald Hinds	Minister of National Security
Pennelope Beckles	Minister of Planning and Development
Allyson West	Minister of Public Administration
Marvin Gonzales	Minister of Public Utilities
Donna Cox	Minister of Social Development and Family Services
Shamfa Cudjoe	Minister of Sport and Community Development
Randall Mitchell	Minister of Tourism, Culture and the Arts
Paula Gopee-Scoon	Minister of Trade and Industry Enterprise Development
Rohan Sinanan	Minister of Works and Transport
Foster Cummings	Minister of Youth Development and National Service
Avinash Singh	Minister in the Ministry of Agriculture, Land and Fisheries
Lisa Morris-Julian	Minister in the Ministry of Education
Brian Manning	Minister in the Ministry of Finance
Adrian Leonce	Minister in the Ministry of Housing and Urban Development
Renuka Sagramsingh-Sooklal	Minister in the Office of the Attorney General and Legal Affairs
Ayanna Webster-Roy	Minister in the Office of the Prime Minister
Stuart Young	Minister in the Office of the Prime Minister
Symon de Nobriga	Minister in the Office of the Prime Minister
Hassel Bacchus	Minister of Digital Transformation
Richie Sookhai	Minister in the Ministry of Works and Transport
Ref:

== Personal life ==
He is married to attorney-at-law Sharon Rowley and has four children. He is a member of the Seventh-day Adventist Church.

Party political offices
Preceded by Patrick Manning	Leader of the People's National Movement; 2010–2025	Succeeded by Pennelope Beckles-Robinson
Preceded by Kamla Persad-Bissessar	Prime Minister of Trinidad and Tobago; 2015–2025	Succeeded by Stuart Young
