= Ministry of Finance (Trinidad and Tobago) =

Government ministry of Trinidad and Tobago

Trinidad and Tobago Ministry of Finance
- The "Coat of Arms" is used as the Ministry's seal.

Ministry overview
- Jurisdiction: Government of Trinidad and Tobago
- Headquarters: Eric Williams Plaza, (Trinidad and Tobago)
- Annual budget: TT$7,407,554,030.00 TTD (2025)
- Minister responsible: Davendranath Tancoo, Minister of Finance
- Deputy Minister responsible: Kennedy Swaratsingh, Minister in the Ministry of Finance
- Ministry executives: Suzette Taylor-Lee Chee, Permanent Secretary; Yasmin Harris, Comptroller of Customs and Excise
- Child agencies: Customs and Excise Division; Financial Intelligence Unit of Trinidad and Tobago; National Insurance Board; National Lotteries Control Board; Trinidad and Tobago Securities Exchange Commission; Trinidad and Tobago Unit Trust Corporation
- Website: http://www.finance.gov.tt/

The Ministry of Finance is a Ministry in the Government of Trinidad and Tobago. The head of the ministry is the Minister of Finance and is appointed by the President of Trinidad and Tobago on the advice of the Prime Minister. The incumbent, Davendranath Tancoo was appointed on May 3, 2025, He replaced Vishnu Dhanpaul. The Minister in the Ministry of Finance is Senator Kennedy Swaratsingh, he was appointed on May 13, 2025, he is also the Minister of Planning, Economic Affairs and Development.

The Ministry's Permanent Secretaries are currently Suzette Taylor-Lee Chee (2024), Michelle Durham-Kissoon (2016), and Dexter Jaggernauth (2023, Ag) with Yasmin Harris as Comptroller of Customs and Excise.

The former Minister of Finance Vishnu Dhanpaul assumed office on March 17, 2025, succeeding Colm Imbert, who was minister from September 2015 to March 2025, Dhanpaul was appointed as minister following the appointment of Stuart Young as Prime Minister.

== History ==
The first mention of The Ministry of Finance was in 1956 when an elected Minister of Finance would replace the Official Financial Secretary (British civil servant), before Trinidad and Tobago, gained independence from Great Britain in 1962. The first Minister of Finance was Dr. Eric Williams, which followed the Trinidad and Tobago general election, 1956.

== Ministers ==
- Eric Williams, 1957-1961
- A.N.R. Robinson, 1961-1966
- Eric Williams, 1966-1971
- George Chambers, 1971-1974
- Eric Williams, 1977-1981
- George Chambers, 1981-1986
- A.N.R. Robinson, 1986-1988
- Selby Wilson, 1989-1991
- Wendell Mottley, 1991-1995
- Brian Kuei Tong, 1995-2000
- Gerald Yetming, 2000-2001
- Patrick Manning, 2001-2007
- Karen Nunez-Tesheira, 2007-2010
- Winston Dookeran, 2010-2012
- Larry Howai, 2012-2015
- Colm Imbert, 2015-2025
- Vishnu Dhanpaul, 2025
- Davendranath Tancoo, 2025-present

== Divisions ==
=== The Divisions of the Ministry of Finance of Trinidad and Tobago ===
(in alphabetical order)

- Budget
- Central Tenders Board
- Communications Unit
- Customs and Excise Division
- Economic Management Division
- Financial Intelligence Unit
- General Administration Division
- Inland Revenue Division
- Investments Division
- National Insurance Appeals Tribunal
- Office Of The Supervisor Of Insolvency
- Public Private Partnership Unit
- Strategic Management and Execution Office (SMO)
- Treasury Division
- Treasury Solicitor’s Division
- Valuation Division

=== Law Enforcement Units ===
- Trinidad and Tobago Customs and Excise Division: They are responsible for enforcement of customs and excise laws.
- The Financial Intelligence Unit of Trinidad and Tobago (FIUTT) became operational in February 2010. Their responsibilities are to implement the anti-money laundering and anti-terrorism policies of the Financial Action Task Force (FATF).

== Responsibilities of the Ministry ==
The Ministry of Finance has responsibility for most fiscal matters relating to the government, several state bodies and personnel departments of various public services. Some of these are:

- Actuarial Services
- Banking (Central and Commercial)
- Borrowing (Local and Foreign)
- Budgeting/Budgetary Control
- Consolidated Fund
- Customs and Excise
- Debt Management
- Divestments
- Double Taxation Treaties
- Economic Management
- Financial Intelligence
- Fiscal Policy and Monetary Policy
- Fiscal Matters
- Heritage and Stabilisation Fund
- Infrastructure Development Fund
- Inland Revenue
- Insolvency
- International Financing
- Investments
- Lotteries and Gaming
- National Insurance
- Pensions and Gratuities
- Personnel Department Matters relating to the role of the Minister of Finance as specified in various Acts governing the Public Service
- Public Procurement
- Public Sector Finance Management
- Special Funds
- State Enterprises (Corporation Sole)
- Strategic Planning and Execution
- Treasury
- Treasury Solicitor
- Valuation

== Statutory Boards and Other Bodies ==
There are several Statutory Boards whose mandate fall under the Ministry. Some of whom are:

- Central Tenders Board
- Deposit Insurance Corporation
- National Insurance Appeals Tribunal
- National Insurance Board
- National Insurance Property Development Company Limited
- National Lotteries Control Board
- Office of Procurement Regulation
- Trinidad and Tobago Securities Exchange Commission
- Trinidad and Tobago Unit Trust Corporation

== State Owned Enterprises ==
The Ministry has responsibility for companies which are wholly owned, majority owned, minority owned and indirectly owned by the government. Some of these companies are:

=== Wholly Owned Enterprises ===
- CLICO Trust Corporation Limited (CLICO Investment Fund)
- Export-Import Bank of Trinidad and Tobago Limited (EXIMBANK)
- First Citizens Holdings Limited
- Government Human Resource Services Limited
- Government Information Services Limited
- National Broadcasting Network
- Seafood Industry Development Company Limited
- Trinidad and Tobago International Financial Centre Management Company Limited
- Union Estate Electricity Generation Company Limited

=== Majority Owned Enterprises ===
- Caribbean Airlines Limited
- National Enterprises Limited

=== Minority Owned Enterprises ===
- Caribbean Investment Corporation
- DFL Caribbean Holdings Limited
- Trinidad and Tobago Development Finance Limited
- Trinidad and Tobago Mortgage Bank Limited (TTMB)

=== Indirectly Owned Enterprises ===
- Caribbean Development Network Limited
- Caribbean Leasing Company Limited
- Caribbean Microfinance Limited
- Colonial Life Insurance Company Limited
- First Citizens Asset Management Limited
- First Citizens Bank (Barbados) Limited
- First Citizens Bank Limited
- First Citizens Brokerage and Advisory Services
- First Citizens Costa Rica S.A.
- First Citizens Financial Services (St. Lucia) Limited
- First Citizens Investment Services (Barbados) Limited
- First Citizens Investment Services Limited
- First Citizens Securities Trading Limited
- First Citizens Trustee Services Limited
- First Citizens (St. Lucia) Limited
- NEL Power Holdings Limited

== Budget ==
The Ministry of Finance financial allocations are distributed through the national budget.

The Ministry’s total allocation of the National Budget for the period 2019 to 2025
Year	Total Allocation	National Budget	Percentage of National Budget	Notes
2019	$6,644,866,532.00	$54,581,467,181.00	12.10%	
2020	$6,605,822,807.00	$57,388,076,726.00	11.52%	
2021	$5,276,379,653.00	$56,498,472,820.00	9.34%	
2022	$6,227,104,681.00	$58,974,346,470.00	10.56%	
2023	$7,013,578,526.00	$69,379,928,103.00	10.11%	
2024	$6,325,484,110.00	$64,467,985,780.00	9.81%	2
2025	$7,407,554,030.00	$63,530,583,090.00	11.66%	2

Note 1: Information from page 58 of a summary of expenditure for the Ministry of Finance (MOF) for the period 2019-2025 By the FINANCIAL SCRUTINY UNIT of Office of the Parliament of Trinidad and Tobago.

Note 2: Quote on page 58 in MOF summary "For the Fiscal Years 2019-2023, actual figures were used to calculate the total allocation. However, estimates were used to calculate the total allocation for the Fiscal Years 2024 and 2025."

Note 3: Quote on page 58 in MOF summary "Total Allocation for the Ministry of Finance =Recurrent Expenditure + Consolidated Fund Expenditure"

== See also ==
- Ministry of Economy and Finance (Haiti)
- Ministry of Finance (Dominican Republic)
- Ministry of Finance (Grenada)
- Ministry of Finance (Guyana)
- Ministry of Finance (Suriname)
- Ministry of Finance and the Public Service (Jamaica)
- Ministry of Economy and Finance (Venezuela)
