= Central Bank of Trinidad and Tobago =

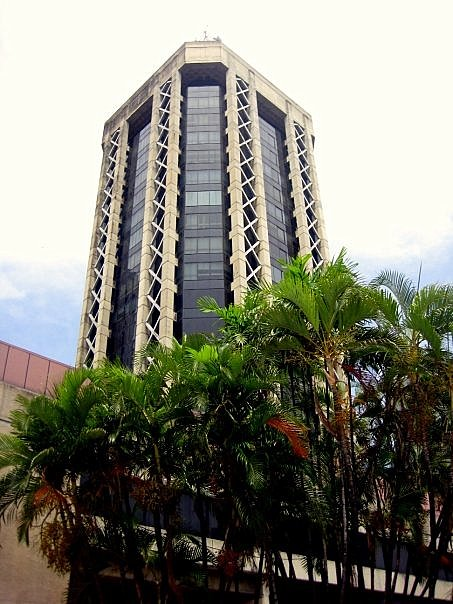
- Central Bank of Trinidad and Tobago in Port of Spain, Trinidad and Tobago
- Central bank of: Trinidad and Tobago
- Headquarters: Eric Williams Plaza, Port of Spain, Trinidad and Tobago
- Established: December 12, 1964
- Ownership: 100% state ownership
- Governor and Chairman: Larry Howai
- Currency: Trinidad and Tobago Dollar; TTD (ISO 4217)
- Reserves: 9 790 million USD
- Website: www.central-bank.org.tt

The Central Bank of Trinidad and Tobago is the central bank of Trinidad and Tobago.

The Central Bank of Trinidad and Tobago is located in the Eric Williams Financial Complex. The complex consists of the central bank auditorium and two sky-scrapers, locally known as the Twin Towers. The first tower houses the Central Bank of Trinidad and Tobago and the second tower houses the Ministry of Finance. It was only the second Central Bank to be established in the English-speaking Caribbean, the first being the Bank of Jamaica which was established in 1960.

== Governors ==
- John Pierce (1964–1966)
- Alexander McLeod (1966–1969)
- Victor Bruce (1969–1984)
- Euric Bobb (1984–1988)
- William Demas (1988–1992)
- Thomas Ainsworth Harewood (1992–1997)
- Winston Dookeran (1997–2002)
- Ewart S. Williams (2002–2012)
- Jwala Rambarran (2012–2015)
- Alvin Hilaire (2015–2025)
- Larry Howei (since 2025)

== Functions ==
The Central Bank of Trinidad and Tobago undertakes many functions in its day-to-day operations. The Central Bank of Trinidad and Tobago was established by an Act of Parliament on December 12, 1964. In particular, the Bank's main responsibilities are to issue and redeem currency; maintain monetary and financial stability; act as banker to the government as well as the commercial banks and protect the external value of the Trinidad and Tobago Dollar (TT Dollar).

The Central Bank is the only institution in the country which is authorised to issue currency notes and coins. The Central Bank is responsible for:

the design of the currency; the maintenance of its integrity and providing an adequate supply of currency to satisfy the needs of the public. for open market operations

The Bank became the 100th member of the Alliance for Financial Inclusion in 2013. Additionally, it has made a Maya Declaration Commitment to transform the National Financial Literacy Programme into a National Training Institute for Financial Inclusion by the conclusion of 2014. The institute will work with key stakeholders to develop a National Financial Inclusion strategy based on the G-20 principles of leadership, co-operation and empowerment. The financial inclusion strategy will focus on the major pillars of financial education and financial consumer protection.

== Challenges ==
In its 40 years of existence, the Bank has faced many challenges, some a direct result of exogenous shocks, others because of the impact of domestic policies. When the Bank was established in 1964, Trinidad and Tobago was part of the sterling area which provided for full convertibility of the local currency into sterling. The Ministry of Finance administered exchange controls against other currencies.

The late 1960s and early 1970s were characterized by great turmoil both at home and abroad. The external source of turmoil was linked to continuing concerns about the strength of sterling and the TT dollar/sterling peg. In November 1967, when the pound sterling was devalued, the TT dollar was adjusted by the same amount to maintain its sterling parity. In 1970, the administration of exchange controls was delegated to the Bank, sterling was subject to exchange controls and the TT dollar peg was shifted from the pound sterling to the US dollar at a rate of TT$2.40 per US dollar. The Defence Finance regulations of 1942 under which exchange controls had been administered was replaced by a new Exchange Control Act in 1970.

The domestic turmoil of the early 1970s came in the form of socio-political upheaval, and what came to be known as the Black Power Revolution. One outgrowth of this upheaval was the movement towards the localisation of commercial banks, initiated by the Government but with the Bank playing an important role.

In the mid-1980s, the Bank faced a major threat to the financial system when oil prices slumped and the economy slipped into recession. Several non-bank financial institutions (NFIs) failed due to weak internal controls and excessive exposure to the real estate market. Initially, the Bank, in conjunction with the commercial banks, provided short-term financial support. When it was clear that the problem was not one of liquidity but insolvency, the Bank moved to close down five of the NFIs. The crisis of the finance companies was to absorb a great deal of the energy of the Bank's leadership in the mid-1980s.

In 1986, as a result of lessons learnt from the NFI crisis, several amendments were made to the Central Bank Act and the Financial Institutions (Non-Banking) Act. The amendments conferred special emergency powers on the Bank to intervene in financial institutions to protect the interests of depositors and creditors. They also established the Deposit Insurance Corporation as a subsidiary of the Bank. The amendments were quite timely as the Bank utilized them that same year to close five NFIs. The Bank was also called upon to intervene in the Trinidad Co-operative Bank in 1986 and in the Workers' Bank in 1989.

In 1993, the Bank facilitated the merger of three indigenous financial institutions – National Commercial Bank, Workers' Bank and Trinidad Co-operative Bank – to form the First Citizens Bank (FCB). The measures were intended to protect depositors from losses and reduce the risk of wider instability in the banking system. The Bank's involvement in the formation of FCB was a significant development in its history and contributed to the restructuring of Trinidad and Tobago's banking sector..

From its inception, the Bank saw itself as having a developmental role. Consistent with this orientation, from the start of the decade of the 1980s, the Bank became involved in a number of institution-building initiatives. Thus, for example, the Bank worked to establish the Trinidad and Tobago Stock Exchange and the Trinidad and Tobago Unit Trust Corporation in 1981. In 1986, in collaboration with the commercial banks, life insurance companies, the National Insurance Board and the International Finance Corporation, another familiar institution was established: the Home Mortgage Bank.

== Reform of the monetary framework ==
Prior to the establishment of the Bank in 1964, and in the aftermath of World War II, monetary policy and management were largely conducted by several different institutions. The British Caribbean Currency Board, which was established in 1951, issued and redeemed currency with little or no consideration of prices or credit conditions in the domestic economy. The credit policies of the foreign banks were managed by Headquarters and foreign exchange matters were administered by the Exchange Division of the Ministry of Finance.

With the passage of the Central Bank Act (No. 23 of 1964), the Bank took responsibility for the conduct of monetary policy. Monetary Policy refers broadly to those actions and decisions undertaken by the Bank to create appropriate monetary conditions in line with the developmental objectives of the country. The conduct of monetary policy is influenced significantly by the pace of real economic activity, the fiscal operations of the government, capital inflows and the operations of the commercial banks. These factors impact on liquidity and in turn affect inflation, foreign exchange reserve holdings and the exchange rate.

The Bank's monetary policy objectives and tools have had to constantly adapt to the needs of a rapidly changing domestic and international economic environment. The monetary policy framework of the Bank has as its primary objectives, the maintenance of:

- a low and stable rate of inflation
- an orderly foreign exchange market
- an adequate level of foreign exchange reserves

As noted earlier, Trinidad and Tobago passed through a major economic and financial crisis in the second half of the 1980s consequent to the slump in oil prices. In addition to a rapid rise in inflation, the country experienced acute balance of payments and debt servicing difficulties.

In an effort to help address this situation, initially, the Bank was called upon to administer a dual exchange rate regime and an exchange control system to severely curtail foreign exchange outflows - the system known as the EC zero system. This was essentially a form of strict foreign exchange budgeting to permit traditional importers and other users to receive an allocation of foreign currency on a quarterly basis for the year ahead.

When the reliance on these controls proved to be ineffective the Government adopted a new strategy involving the negotiation of a stabilisation and structural adjustment programme with the International Monetary Fund and the World Bank and the negotiation of debt rescheduling agreements with creditor banks and the Paris Club. In the context of these agreements, the Bank, in the early 1990s embarked on a comprehensive programme of financial sector reform geared to liberalise the financial system as well as to modernise the Bank's prudential and supervisory framework.

In recent years the Bank has continued to refine its monetary policy framework and upgrade its regulatory and supervisory regime to bring it more in line with international best practices. The new monetary framework introduced in 2002 uses the repo rate (the rate at which the Bank is prepared to provide overnight financing to commercial banks) as the principal instrument to indicate the desired direction of bank interest rates and to convey the desired monetary policy stance. The Bank has also implemented a phased reduction in the reserve requirement applied to commercial banks.

The business of the Bank will continue to evolve as the domestic and international financial environment changes. In addition to its traditional functions such as monetary policy, financial system supervision, its responsibility for currency and management of reserves and its research function, new horizons are emerging. These include improving the country's infrastructure, as evidenced by such initiatives as the reform of the payment system, strengthening the government securities market and participation in the regional credit rating agency and the Automated Credit Bureau.

== See also ==
- Trinidad and Tobago Securities and Exchange Commission
- Economy of Trinidad and Tobago
- Central banks and currencies of the Caribbean
- List of central banks
- List of financial supervisory authorities by country
