= Downtown Port of Spain =

- District
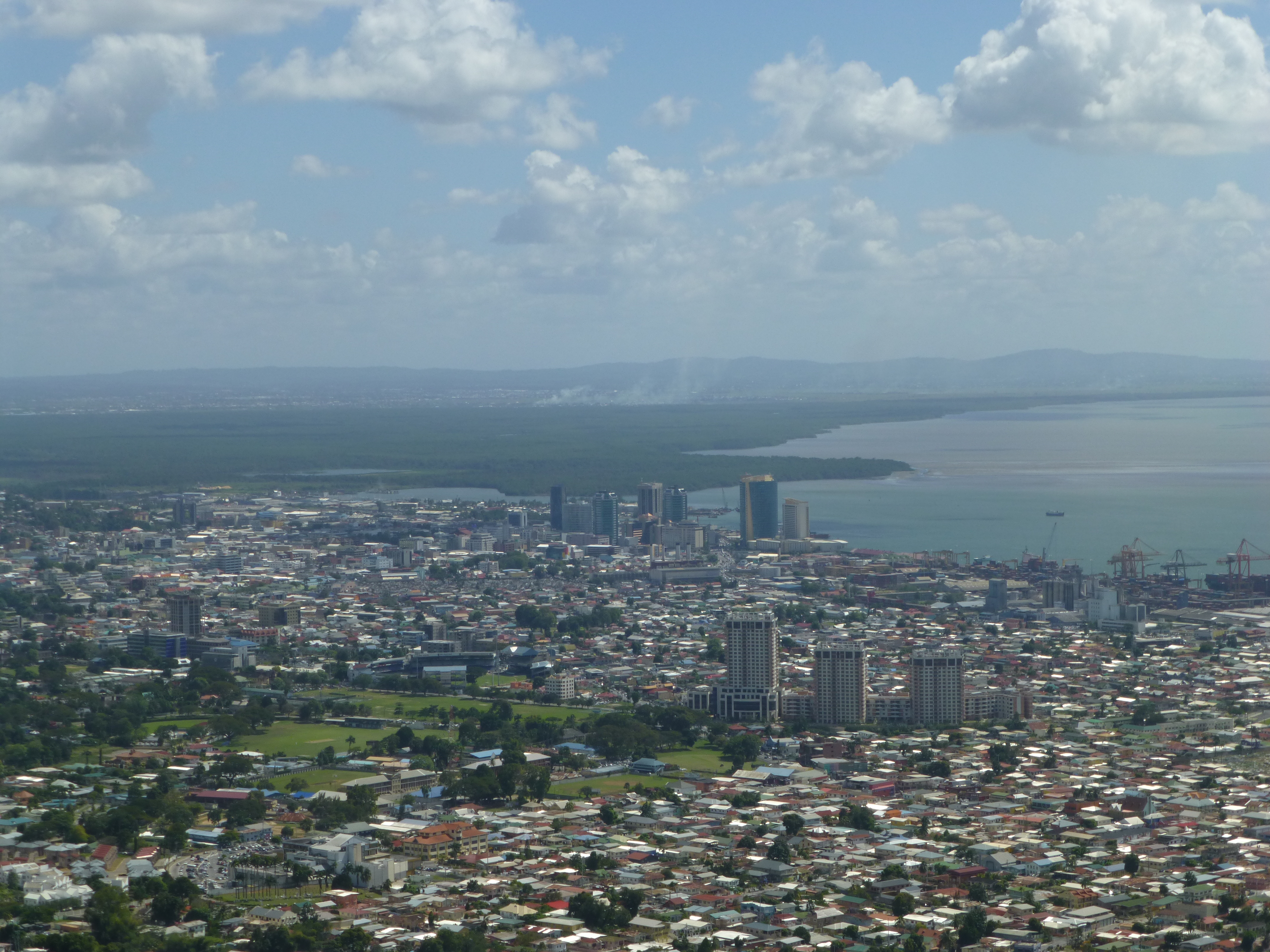
- Downtown District of the City of Port of Spain.
- Country: Trinidad and Tobago
- City: Port of Spain

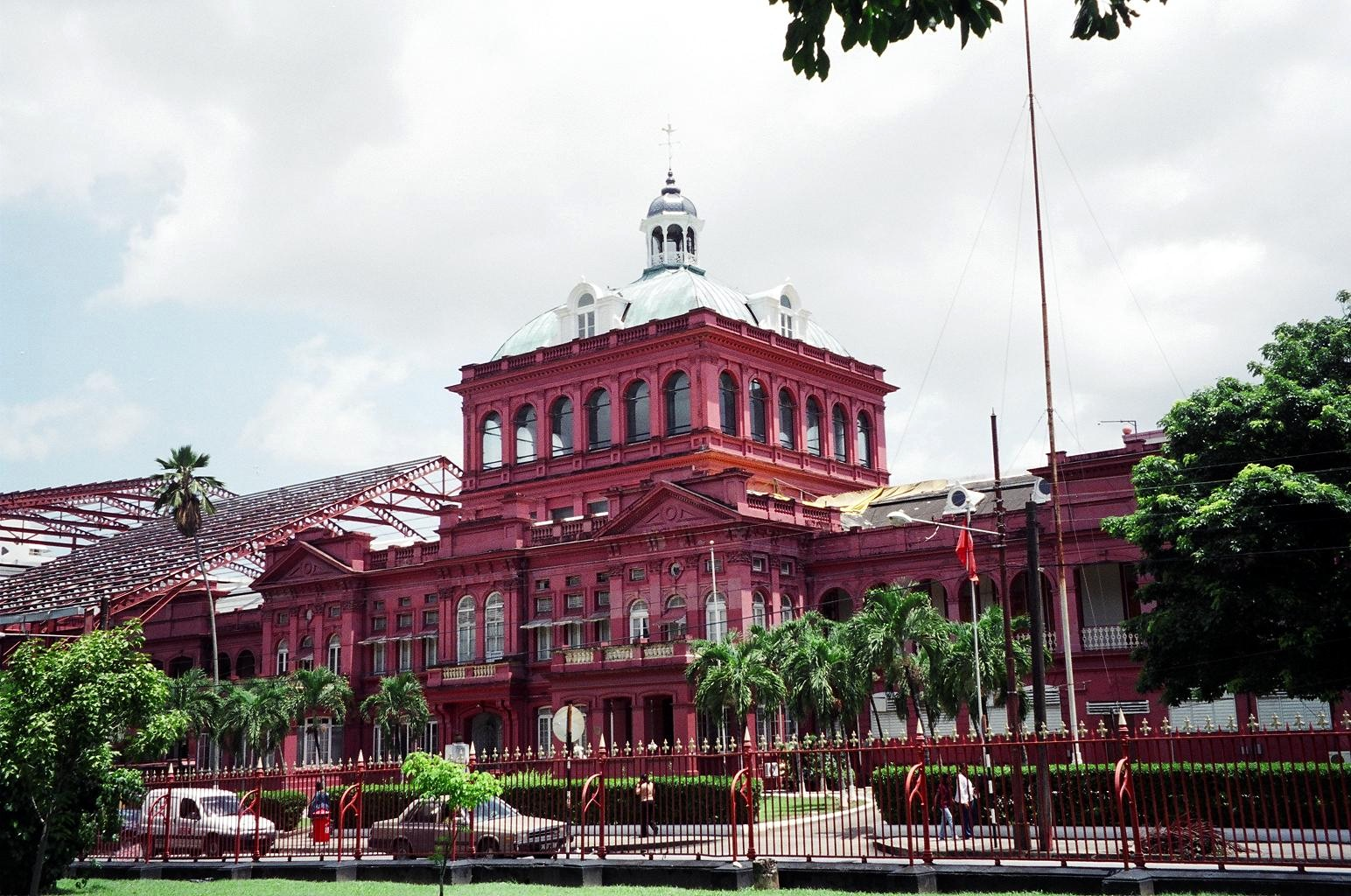
Red House, seat of the Parliament of Trinidad and Tobago

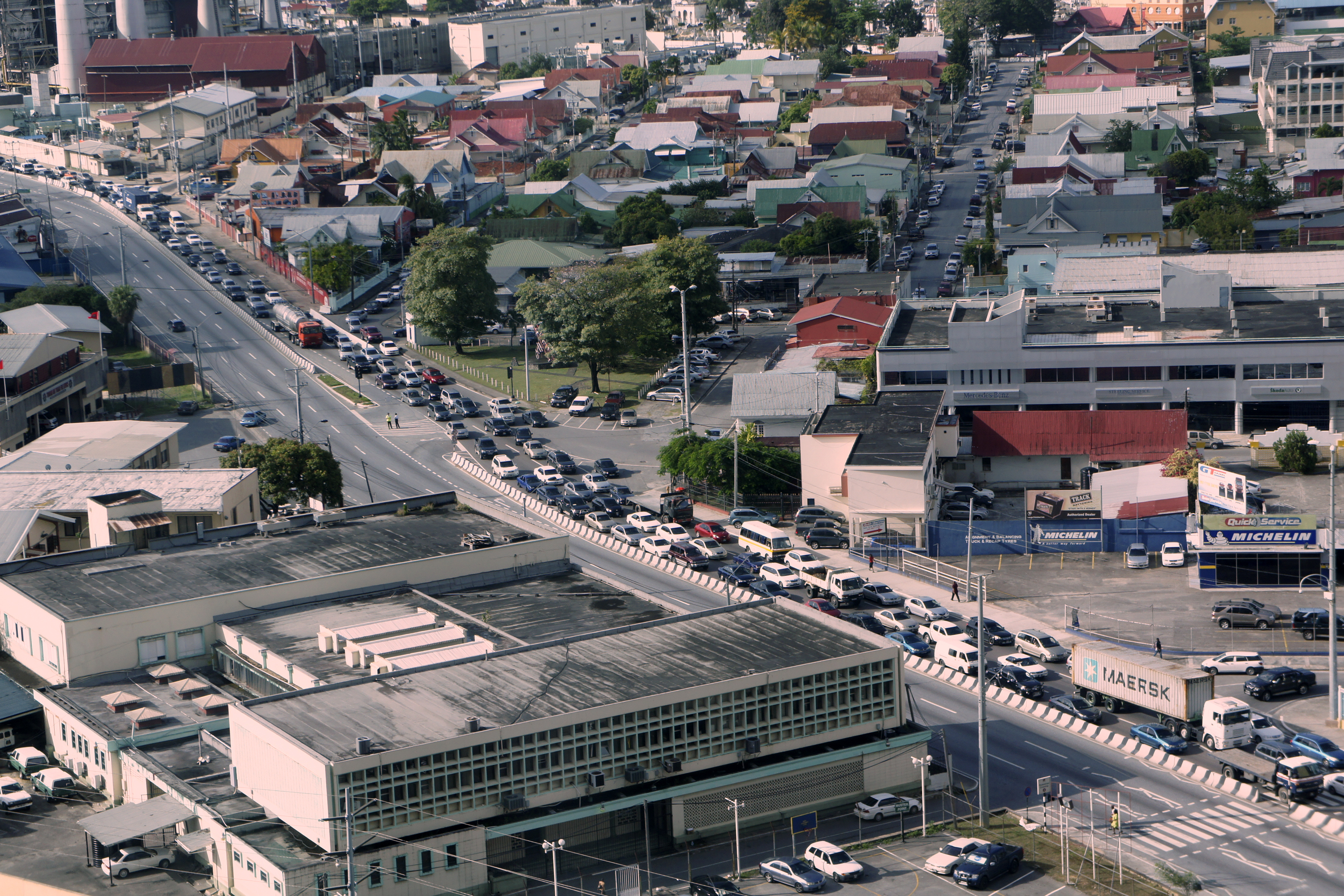
Traffic congestion in Port of Spain, 2012

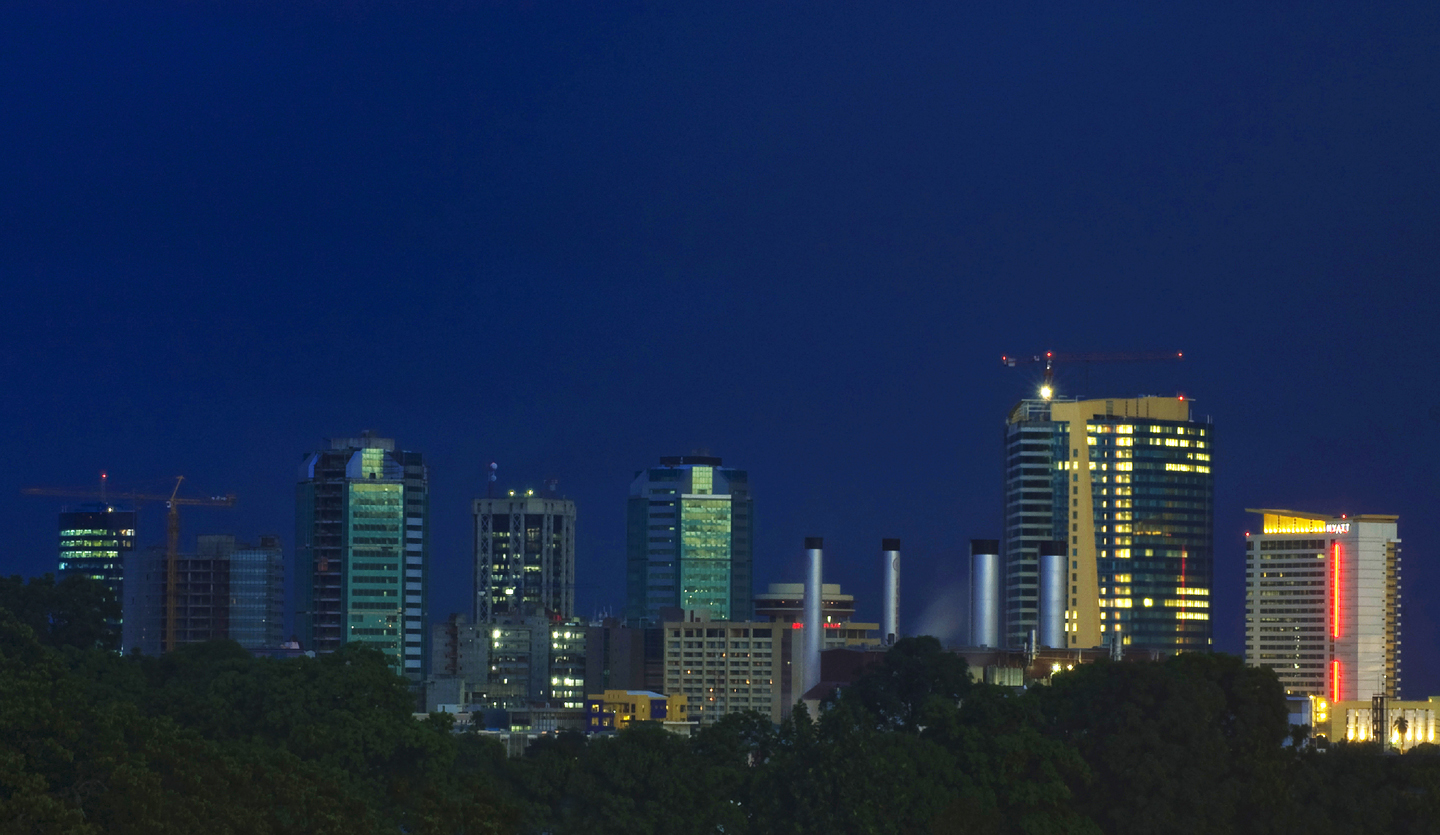
Port of Spain night skyline, 2008

Downtown Port of Spain is the central business district and historic core of Port of Spain, the capital city of Trinidad and Tobago. It is the oldest district of the city, having developed during the late 18th century as a centre of commercial and administrative activity. The district is bounded by South Quay to the south, Oxford Street to the north, the St. Ann's River to the east, and Richmond Street to the west. Downtown Port of Spain contains major government offices, financial institutions, and public spaces, and continues to serve as a key hub for commerce and public life in the city.

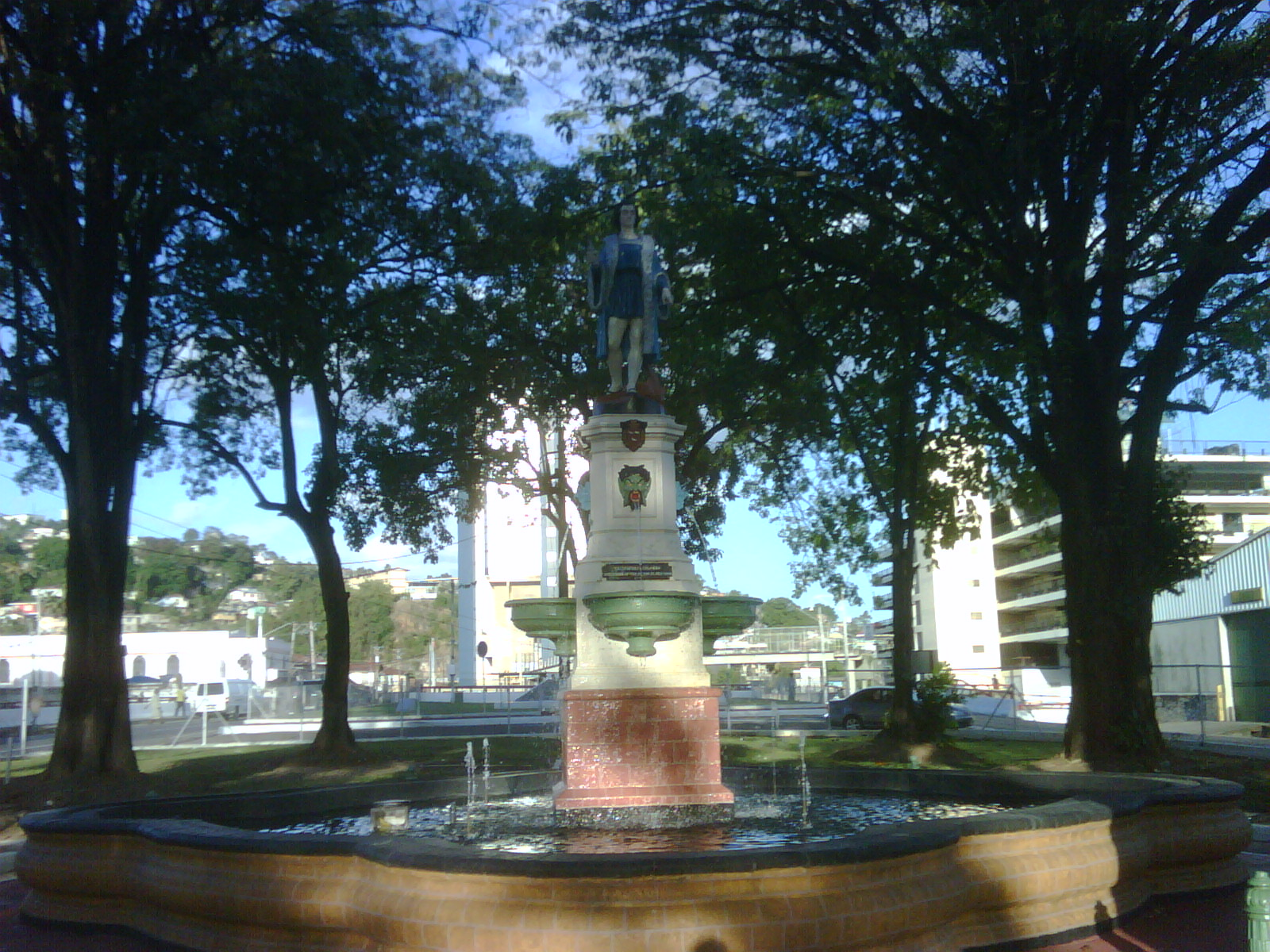
Christopher Columbus Square, Independence Square East, Port of Spain, April 2009

== Woodford Square ==
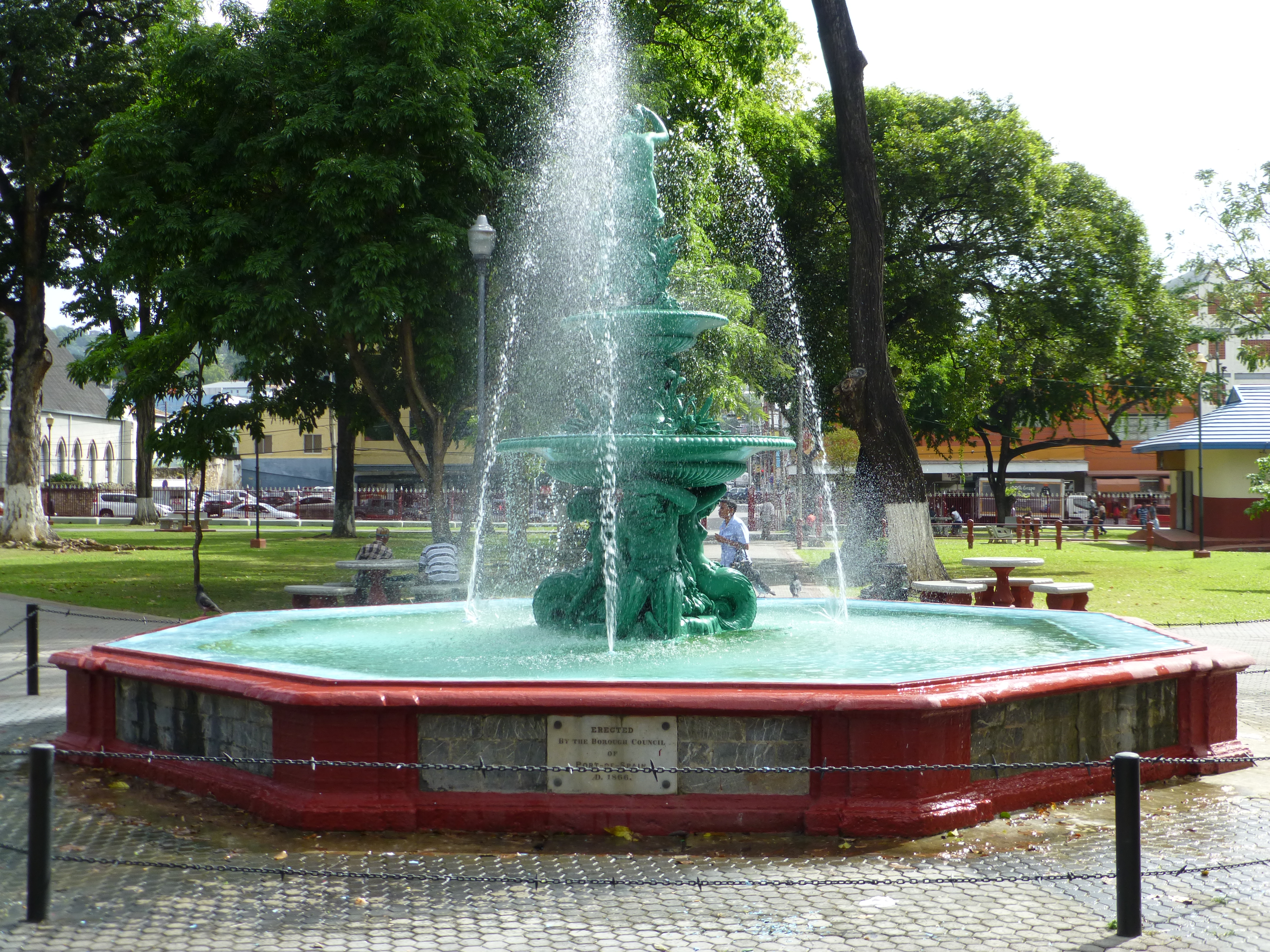
Woodford Square, Port of Spain, Trinidad

The heart of downtown is Woodford Square - formerly Brunswick Square (renamed in the 19th century for British Governor, Sir Ralph Woodford). On its northern side are City Hall and the Hall of Justice, seat of the Supreme Court; on its western side is the Red House, seat of Parliament; the Anglican Holy Trinity Cathedral is on its south side, and on the block south-west of the square is the National Library. A number of government offices are located in the immediate vicinity, and the blocks north and west of the Red House are home to many lawyers' chambers. Another busy area in Port Of Spain is Independence Square, located closer to the waterfront and to most of the high rise structures of the city.

Woodford Square itself is a green oasis in the heart of the city, with a late-Victorian fountain and bandstand, trees, benches, and lawns. It has famously been the site of many political rallies over the decades; former Prime Minister Eric Williams gave many public lectures here, dubbing it "the University of Woodford Square", and near the eastern gate is a spot which has become Port of Spain's Speakers' Corner.

== Independence Square ==
Two blocks south of Woodford Square is Independence Square (formerly Marine Square), which runs along the breadth of downtown Port of Spain from Wrightson Road to the west to the Roman Catholic Cathedral Basilica of the Immaculate Conception in the east. The section of the square immediately behind the cathedral is called Columbus Square. Before extensive land reclamation in the early 19th century, the city's shoreline ran through Independence Square.

In the early 1970s, illegal vendors who had set up shop in the middle of the square were evicted and major repaving and landscaping was undertaken. The new pedestrian area in the middle of the square was named the Brian Lara Promenade in honour of Trinidad and Tobago's star cricket batsman. Where Independence Square is bisected by Frederick Street there is a roundabout with a statue of Captain A.A. Cipriani, the early 20th-century populist politician and mayor of the city. South of the square, Frederick Street widens and becomes Broadway, which terminates at the waterfront and the Port of Spain lighthouse, no longer used as a navigational aid but considered a major landmark. (For Trinidadians born and bred in Port of Spain or its northern and north-western suburbs, "past the lighthouse"—east of the lighthouse on the Beetham Highway—means outside the city proper.)

On the southern side of Independence Square are the twin towers of the Eric Williams Financial Complex (home of the Central Bank and the Ministry of Finance) and the new Nicholas Tower, a commercial office building. Recently completed was the Richmond street Government Campus Plaza and the International Waterfront Centre Towers including the Hyatt Regency Hotel, with Towers C and D standing as the tallest buildings in Trinidad and Tobago and seventh and eighth tallest in the entire Caribbean region.

== Frederick Street ==
Frederick Street, which runs north through the city to the Queen's Park Savannah, is Port of Spain's major avenue, connecting the two downtown squares with the uptown park, and very approximately dividing downtown into retail (east) and office (west) districts. One block east, lower Henry Street is the location of a number of shops selling cloth, mostly owned by members of Trinidad's Syrian-Lebanese community. Another block over, Charlotte Street at its lower end is Port of Spain's Chinatown in all but name, home to dozens of general emporia known for bargain shopping.
