= WI Sports =

Cable television network in Trinidad and Tobago

- Country: Trinidad and Tobago
- Broadcast area: Columbus subscribers in Trinidad and Tobago
- Affiliates: Flow Trinidad
- Headquarters: Ground Floor, Nicholas Towers, Independence Square, Port of Spain

Programming
- Language: English

Ownership
- Owner: Flow Trinidad
- Key people: Rhea Yaw Ching

Links
- Website: http://www.wisportstv.com/

Availability

Streaming media
- Ustream: http://www.usportt.com/usporttv/

WI Sports is a local sports channel that broadcasts on channel 14 on the Flow Trinidad cable system serving Trinidad. It is a cable only channel dedicated to airing local and regional sporting events, leagues, news highlights and live feeds of games. Its headquarters are located at Ground Floor, Nicholas Towers, Independence Square, Port of Spain.

== History ==
On 1 April 2010, WI Sports replaced Tempo TV due to low viewership. On Sunday 1 April 2012, Tempo TV returned to Flow's channel lineup.

== Network Slogans ==
- Bringing local sports to your homes. (2011–present)
