= Trinidad and Tobago Stock Exchange =

Stock index of Trinidad and Tobago

The Trinidad and Tobago Stock Exchange Limited
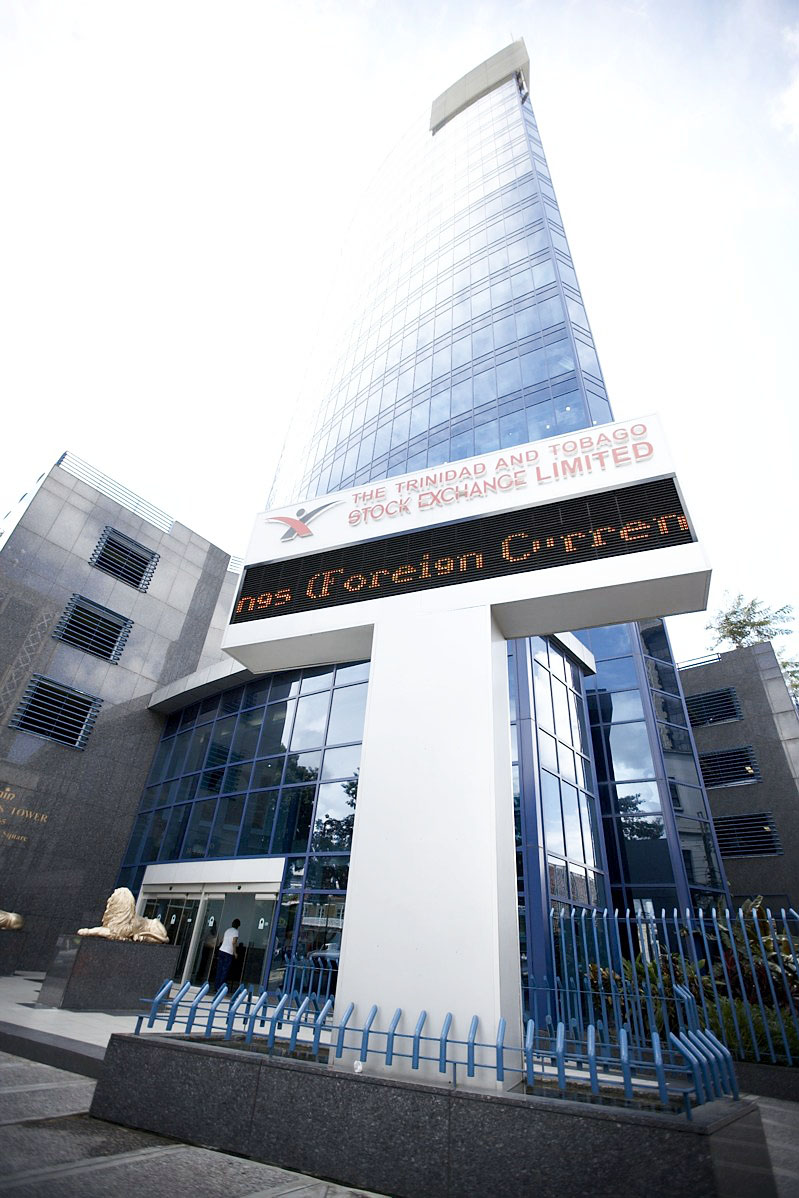
- Type: Stock exchange
- Location: Port of Spain, Trinidad and Tobago
- Founded: 1981; 44 years ago
- Key people: Ray A. Sumairsingh (Chairman); Ian Narine (Deputy Chairman); Eva Mitchell (CEO)
- Currency: Trinidad and Tobago dollar
- No. of listings: 35
- Market cap: US$18.60 Billion
- Indices: Composite; All T&T; Cross Listed; SME
- Website: www.stockex.co.tt

The Trinidad and Tobago Stock Exchange (TTSE) is the main stock exchange in the Republic of Trinidad and Tobago, and the largest stock exchange in the Caribbean region by market capitalization.

As a member-state of CARICOM several companies from Barbados, Jamaica, Saint Vincent and the Grenadines and the Eastern Caribbean Securities Exchange also cross-list their stocks onto the Trinidad and Tobago Stock Exchange.

The unique four symbol alphanumeric Market Identifier Code (MIC) used to identify the TTSE as defined under ISO 10383 is XTRN.

== History ==
=== Foundation and establishment ===
The Securities Market which informally existed in Trinidad & Tobago for well over twenty years prior to the opening of the Trinidad & Tobago Stock Exchange really achieved significance in the early 1970s when the Government decided as a matter of policy to localise the foreign owned commercial banking and manufacturing sectors of the economy. The thrust of the policy was to get such companies to divest and sell a majority of their shares to nationals.

Two bodies chosen to effect this policy were the Capital Issues Committee which was set up by the Ministry of Finance in July 1970 to direct developments in the primary market and the Call Exchange (an association of share dealers) which was established under the umbrella of the Central Bank in August 1965 to monitor activities in the secondary market.

Parallel to this development in the public sector in the early 1970s was the rapid establishment of private institutions such as trust companies and stock broking firms to satisfy the demands of investors in both the primary and secondary markets.

With such infrastructure in place and the concomitant increase in the securities business the decision was taken to establish a securities market within a framework of established Rules and Regulations to facilitate the development of the domestic capital market.

The establishment of the Stock Exchange under the provisions of the Securities Industry Act 1981 was a natural extension of the policy to formalise the securities market in Trinidad and Tobago. This Act was proclaimed on 23 October 1981 and the Stock Exchange was formally opened on 26 October 1981 under the auspices of the Ministry of Finance.

=== 1995 Regulatory issues and updated legislation ===
Over the years and leading up to the current time, there was no doubt that the original Securities Law, that is, The Securities Industry Act, 1981 became ineffective. In attempting to bring both Primary and Secondary market activity under one umbrella, the Act created confusion, and for the most part the provisions were unenforceable.

This was because the Exchange as a regulatory Organisation, had no discretion to reasonably moderate the strict and unreasonable application of the letter of the Act once a particular provision was not explicitly stated in the Act. The Ministry of Finance, in recognizing this problem, worked with the Exchange to introduce a more dynamic piece of legislation.

As a remedial measure, the Government, through the Ministry of Finance, passed legislation repealing the 1981 Act and replacing it with the Securities Industry Act of 1995 which brought into operation the establishment of a Securities and Exchange Commission.

The 1995 Act vests with the Commission, the authority to maintain surveillance over the securities market and ensure orderly, fair and equitable dealings in securities. Furthermore, all market actors, meaning issuers, underwriters, investment advisers, stockbrokers and dealers, etc. must register with the Commission, who will be responsible for controlling and supervising their activities. The Exchange on the other hand will regulate trading on the secondary market, as well as the activities of the Members of the Exchange, subject of course to the oversight by the Commission.

On December 31, 2012 the Securities Industry Act of 1995 was repealed and replaced by the Securities Act, 2012.

=== 2007 - present ===
The TTSE experienced some slowdown, both in terms of activity and listings from legislation which restricted institutions from holding more than 10% of their portfolio in any single company's shares. The Great Recession also contributed to a depressed state of liquidity, listings and pricing on the TTSE. This was further compounded by the slowdown in the Trinidad and Tobago economy stemming from depressed commodity (oil and gas) prices from 2014 onwards. Despite this, there has been a number of large cap listings, including the listings of First Citizen's Bank and the Trinidad and Tobago Natural Gas Company Limited.

== Trading ==
In August 2018, the TTSE Market Capitalization was estimated at TT$120 billion (US$17.7 billion), with conglomerates and financial institutions accounting for the vast majority of value. The companies with the greatest capitalisation on the exchange are Republic Bank (RBL) and First Caribbean International Bank (FCIB). Significant capitalisation is also represented in West Indian Tobacco (WCO), Scotiabank Trinidad and Tobago (SBTT), National Enterprises Limited(NEL), ANSA McAL (AMCL), First Citizen's Bank (FIRST), National Commercial Bank of Jamaica Limited (NCBJ), Trinidad and Tobago Natural Gas Company Limited (TTNGL) and Massy Holdings (MASSY).

Clico Investment Fund (CIF), listed on the Mutual Fund Market, is a company vested with the shares of Republic Bank Limited which were held by the now collapsed CL Financial. The security consists of those shares as well as Government of Trinidad and Tobago Bonds (S&P Rating: BBB+ (neg)). The company was listed in January 2013 and is a closed end mutual fund with a lifespan of approximately 20 years.

The energy sector of Trinidad and Tobago, which is the main driver of the economy and the major source of revenue for the country, is poorly represented on the TTSE, with only the minor oil company, Moraven Holdings (MOV) and National Enterprises (NEL) offering any access to the local energy market. The listing of TTNGL provided some opportunity to buy into the local energy market but significant companies such as Petroleum Company of Trinidad and Tobago (Petrotrin) and National Petroleum Marketing Company (NP) still remain entirely owned by the state. NEL is a government holding company which holds the state owned shares of the National Gas Company of Trinidad and Tobago, Atlantic LNG (Trinidad and Tobago), TRINGEN (ammonia production) and the National Flour Mills (NFM), which in itself is separately listed on the exchange.

Since 2019, successive Ministers of Finance have mooted the idea to have large, successful state agencies list on the TTSE. These entities include, but are not limited to Petrotrin, Hilton Trinidad and the Unit Trust Corporation. There have also been calls to have NEL divested into its individual entities and have these entities listed separately. In addition, suggestions have been made for large multinationals operating in Trinidad and Tobago to list Depository receipt to allow wider national participation in these companies. Such companies include BP (Trinidad and Tobago Ltd), and Repsol (Trinidad and Tobago Ltd). As a result of the sale of RBTT Holdings to the Royal Bank of Canada in a cash and share deal in the late 2000s, a significant number of RBC shares are held by former shareholders of RBTT Holdings, which, at the time of its delisting, was one of the widest held shares on the TTSE.

== Regulation and location ==
The Trinidad and Tobago Stock Exchange falls under the jurisdiction of the Trinidad and Tobago Securities and Exchange Commission.

The TTSE is located at the Nicholas Tower building on Independence Square in Port of Spain.

== See also ==
- Economy, Economy of Trinidad and Tobago, Trinidad and Tobago, Trinidad and Tobago dollar
- List of stock exchanges
- List of stock exchanges in the Americas
- List of stock exchanges in the Commonwealth of Nations
- Capital Market Association of the Eastern Caribbean (CMAEC)
