= First Citizens Bank (Trinidad and Tobago) =

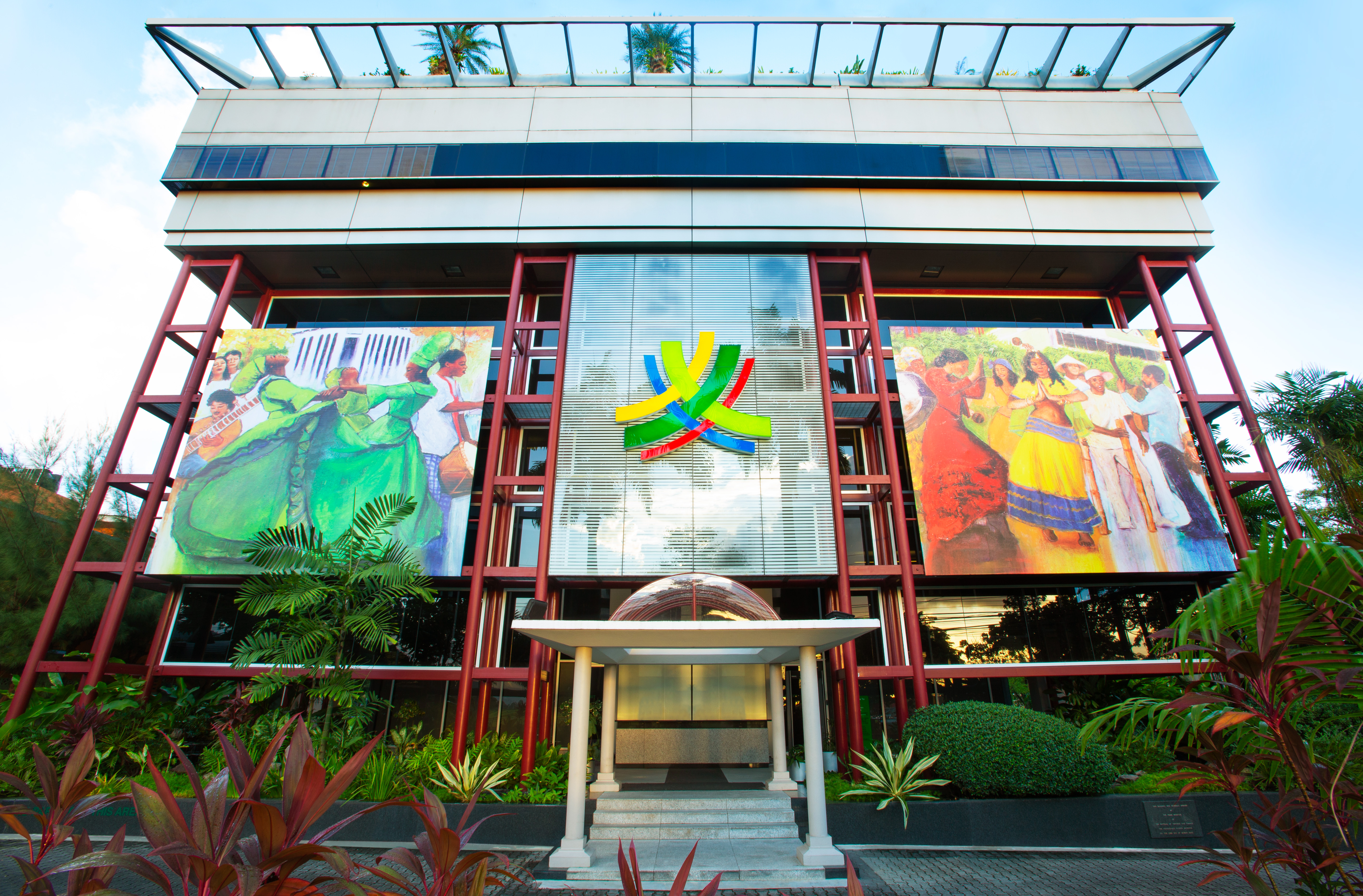
- Company type: Public company
- Traded as: TTSE: FIRST
- Industry: Financial services
- Founded: 1993 Trinidad and Tobago
- Headquarters: Port of Spain, Trinidad and Tobago
- Key people: Karen Darbasie (CEO)
- Products: Financial services
- Website: https://www.firstcitizensgroup.com/

First Citizens Bank (FCB) is a bank based in Trinidad and Tobago. First Citizens has over TT$38 billion in assets, 25 branches in Trinidad and three in Tobago and five in Barbados. It also has a representative office in Costa Rica, which handles its Latam business. It wholly owns First Citizens (St. Lucia) Limited, which it established as an offshore financial vehicle for the Bank and its subsidiaries and also to conduct selected banking and financial service operations in the Caribbean Region. The Group's Chief Executive Officer is Karen Darbasie and the office of Group Chief Financial Officer is held by Shiva Manraj.

== First Citizens Group ==
Established in 1993, the First Citizens Group comprises:

- First Citizens Bank Limited
- First Citizens Asset Management Limited
- First Citizens Trustee Services Limited
- First Citizens (St. Lucia) Limited
- First Citizens Financial Services (St. Lucia) Limited
- First Citizens Securities Trading Limited
- First Citizens Investment Services Limited
- First Citizens Investment Services (Barbados) Limited

== See also ==
- List of banks in the Americas
