= William Demas =

Trinidadian manager and politician (1929–1998)

William Gilbert Demas, OCC, TC (14 November 1929 in Port of Spain – 28 November 1998) was a Trinidad and Tobago economist.

From 1973 to 1974, Demas was the first Secretary-General of the Caribbean Community (CARICOM). He had previously been the Secretary-General of its predecessor, the Caribbean Free Trade Agreement (CARIFTA) from 1969 to 1973 and was instrumental in reforming CARIFTA to CARICOM.

On September 1, 1974, Demas was elected to the presidency of the Caribbean Development Bank. He served for three terms until 1988.

Demas was the Governor of the Central Bank of Trinidad and Tobago from 1988 to 1992.

He was awarded the Trinity Cross, Trinidad and Tobago's highest award, in 1989. In 1992, he was one of the initial recipients of the Order of the Caribbean Community, the highest honour awarded by the Caribbean Community. He was also awarded the Cacique's Crown of Honour, Guyana's second-highest award, in 1972, the Companion of Honour of Barbados in 1982, and the Order of San Carlos by the government of Colombia.
