= Dominicus Supratikto =

Indonesian diplomat (born 1956)

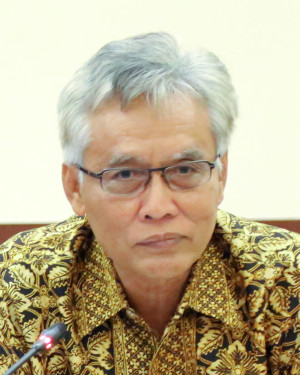

Ambassador of Indonesia to Suriname
- In office 15 October 2014 – December 2018
- President: Susilo Bambang Yudhoyono; Joko Widodo
- Preceded by: Nur Syahrir Rahardjo
- Succeeded by: Julang Pujianto

Personal details
- Born: September 23, 1956 (age 69) Yogyakarta, Indonesia
- Education: Gadjah Mada University (Drs.)

Dominicus Supratikto (born 23 September 1956) is an Indonesian diplomat who served as ambassador to Suriname from 2014 to 2018. Prior to his ambassadorship, Supratikto served as the secretary of the multilateral directorate general and the chief of Yogyakarta's investment and cooperation agency.

== Early life and education ==
Dominicus Supratikto was born on September 23, 1956, in Yogyakarta, Indonesia. Supratikto completed his early education in his hometown, attending Tarakanita elementary school in 1969 and the Yogyakarta 6th state junior high school in 1972 before graduating from De Britto High School in 1976. As a child, Supratikto was part of a football club in his home village. He studied economics at the Gadjah Mada University and completed his degree in 1982.

== Career ==
After graduating, Supratikto initially wanted to work either as an academic reporter or a journalist. He briefly worked as a management consultant and as a reporter for Jurnal Ekuin, a major Indonesian economic news outlet in the 1980s. He then entered the foreign service, and from 1984 to 1985 he undertook basic diplomatic training. He took on his first international posting in 1988 as the head of the economic sub-section at the embassy in Helsinki, Finland. He completed his mission in 1991, and by 1992 was appointed as the chief of investment section within the foreign ministry's directorate for investment and finance. During this time, he undertook a course on investment organized by the United Nations Industrial Development Organization and the International Development Association in 1993.

Following his time in Northern Europe, he moved to South Africa in 1995 to serve as the head of the economic section at the consulate general in Cape Town. He returned to Jakarta as the deputy director for developing countries within the directorate for economic relations with developing countries. Supratikto undertook his mid-level and senior diplomatic course in 2000 and 2001, respectively.

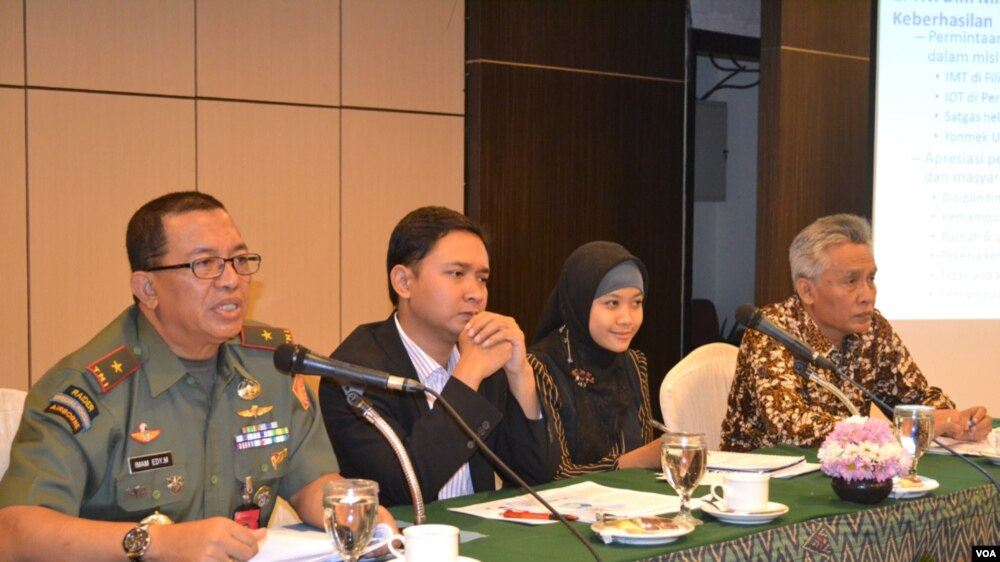
Supratikto (far right) at a seminar in Yogyakarta, 2012.

He was then appointed as the head of the economic section at the embassy in Tokyo, Japan, in 2002. He described his assignment in Japan as an interesting one, as it gave him a chance to observe the decision making process in Japanese people. He admitted that negotiations with Japanese took longer than usual as Japanese diplomats spent their time figuring out their positioning within the negotiations.

Returning to Jakarta, he took on leadership roles within the ministry, serving as a deputy director in the directorate for trade, investment, industry, and intellectual property rights (PPIH, Perdagangan, Perindustrian, Investasi dan Hak Kekayaan Intelektual) in 2006. In 2007, he took a course organized by the World Trade Organization (WTO) and the International Development Law Organization in Sydney as well as another organized by the Netherlands Institute of International Relations Clingendael. He was briefly named as the acting director of PPIH in 2009 before being appointed as the secretary of the multilateral directorate general on 3 September 2010. As secretary, Supratikto voiced his support for a United Nations arms trade treaty, stating that it would prevent weapons to be illegally traded for terrorism and organized crime.

From Jakarta, Supratikto moved to Yogyakarta with his appointment as the chief of Yogyakarta's investment and cooperation agency in 2012. Two years into his office, on 15 October 2014 Supratikto was sworn in as ambassador to Suriname and Guyana. He was relieved of his office in Yogyakarta on 15 January 2015 and presented his credentials to president Dési Bouterse of Suriname on 15 March and to president David A. Granger of Guyana on 7 October.

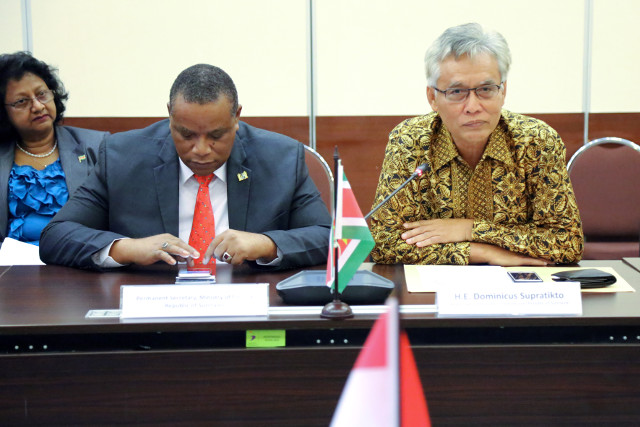
Supratikto with Suriname government officials, 2018.

During his tenure, he focused on transforming the "historical bond" shared between Indonesia and Suriname, which was rooted in the Javanese diaspora, into tangible economic partnerships. He initiated an annual business trip program in 2015 to connect Surinamese entrepreneurs with Indonesian markets and facilitated the development of sharia banking in Suriname through a tripartite collaboration involving Indonesia's private sector and the Islamic Development Bank. He was also instrumental in securing Suriname and Guyana's support for Indonesia's non-permanent membership in the UN Security Council.

Beyond economics, Supratikto worked to revitalize Javanese cultural heritage in Suriname by organizing woodcarving workshops and promoting family pilgrim trips for the diaspora to visit their ancestral homes in Indonesia. Supratikto also engaged Caribbean leaders to ensure they maintained a policy of non-interference regarding domestic issues such as the Papua separatist movement.

Following president Joko Widodo's instruction to explore non-traditional market partners, the government later intensified its cooperation within the Caribbean region through the Caribbean Community framework. Due to the strong cultural links between Indonesia and Suriname, Supratikto's embassy was chosen for accredited to the Caribbean Community, and he presented his credentials to the Secretary-General of Caribbean Community Irwin LaRocque on 2 May 2018. Supratikto's appointment as the first ambassador to the Caribbean Community was followed by a visit by foreign minister Retno Marsudi to the Caribbean Community headquarters in May and Caribbean Community business seminar, which brought together businesspersons from Indonesia and Caribbean countries, in October.

Shortly before the end of his ambassadorial term, in September 2018 Supratikto held a joint commission meeting on bilateral relations with Suriname, which was the first to be held after nine years. Upon completing his tenure in December, Supratikto wrote a book regarding his experiences in Suriname. The book, which was published in 2021, was one of the few books on Suriname written in Indonesian.
