= Karen Darbasie =

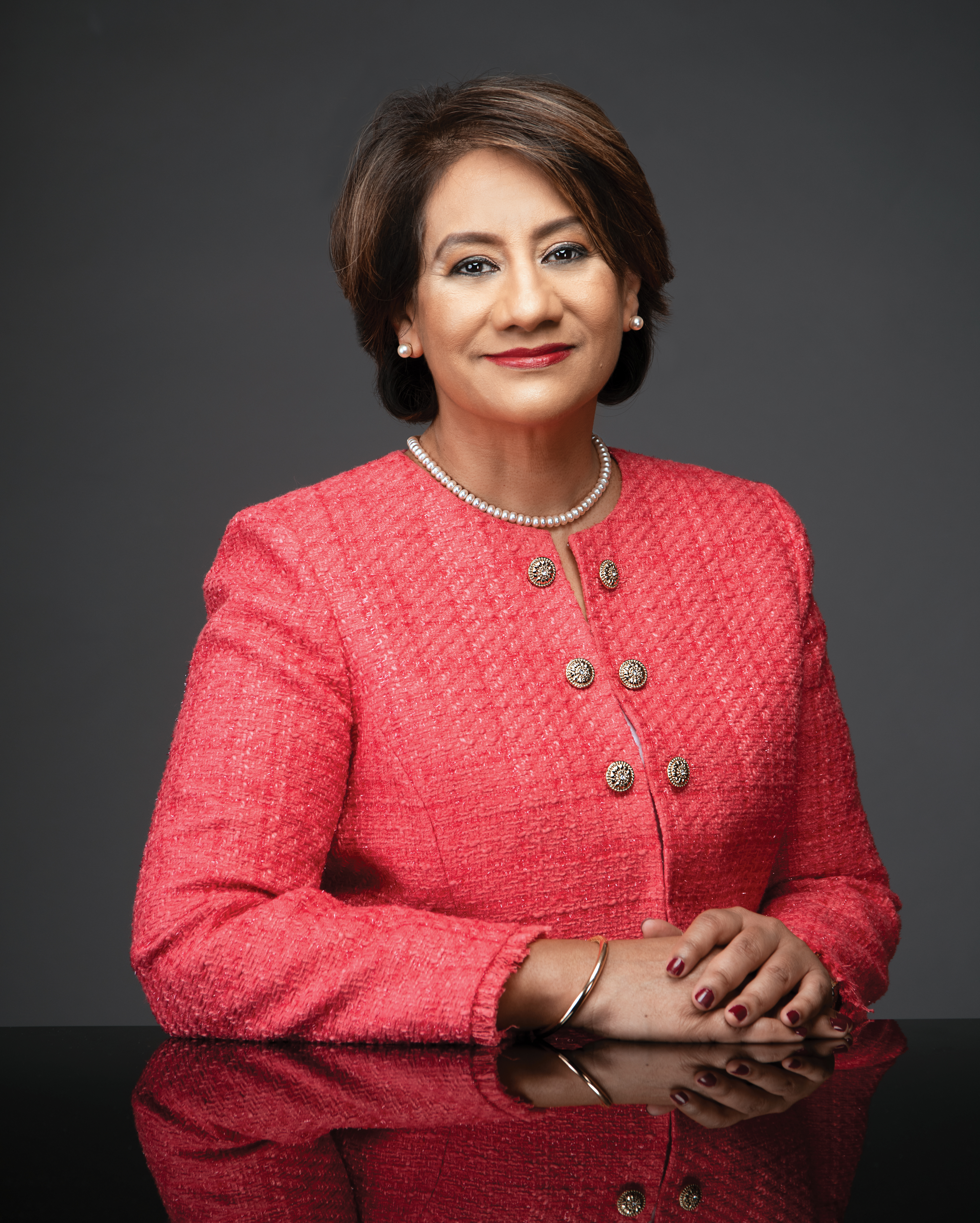
- Born: Trinidad and Tobago
- Education: University of the West Indies at St. Augustine; University of Warwick
- Occupations: Group Chief Executive Officer, First Citizens Group

Karen Darbasie is a banker and businesswoman from Trinidad and Tobago. She is the group CEO of the First Citizens Bank and a previous board director at the American Chamber of Commerce of Trinidad and Tobago. She is a former president of the Bankers Association of Trinidad and Tobago and Chairman of Trinidad Nitrogen Company.

== Education ==
Karen Darbasie earned an undergraduate degree in Electrical Engineering from the University of the West Indies, a Master of Business Administration (MBA) degree from the University of Warwick and a master's degree from the University of Essex.

Darbasie's selection as the CEO of First Citizens was announced by the company in March 2015. At the time, she was Head of Fixed Income, Currencies and Commodities for Citibank Trinidad & Tobago. After a cooling-off period, she began her duties on 7 April.
