= Coat of arms of Trinidad and Tobago =

- Armiger: Republic of Trinidad and Tobago
- Adopted: 9 August 1962; 64 years ago (original version); 25 February 2025; 19 months ago (current version)
- Crest: In front of a palm tree proper a ship's wheel.
- Torse: Argent and gules
- Shield: Per chevron enhanced sable and gules a chevrenel enhanced argent between a chief two Hummingbirds respectant gold and in base a gold Steelpan and its iconic two pan sticks, also gold.
- Supporters: A scarlet ibis and a cocrico, both proper and with wings elevated.
- Compartment: Two islands arising from the sea.
- Motto: "Together we aspire, together we achieve"
- Use: On the national currency, passports, ID cards, birth and death certificates, driver's licenses, signs on government buildings
- Designer: Carlisle Chang and George Bailey

The coat of arms of Trinidad and Tobago was designed by a committee formed in 1962 to select the symbols that would be representative of the people of Trinidad and Tobago. The committee included T. C. Cambridge (chair), Carlisle Chang, J. A. Bullbrook, J. Newel Lewis, Peter Bynoe, Andrew T. Carr, Alston Huggings, Harry Dow, Daniel J. Samaroo, Conrad E. O’Brian, George Bailey, Felix Frederick, Enos Sewlal, Sybil Atteck, Margaret Emily Ottley, Badroul Armstrong, with M.P. Alladin as secretary.

== Design ==
The palm tree crest at the top of the coat of arms was taken from Tobago's coat of arms before it was joined in political union with Trinidad. The shield comprises the same colours (red, white, and black) as the nation's flag and carry the same meaning. The two birds on the shield are hummingbirds. Trinidad is sometimes referred to as the "Land of the Hummingbird" because 18 different species of hummingbird have been recorded on the island. "Land of the Hummingbird" is also believed to have been the Amerindian name for Trinidad. A gold steelpan, the national instrument, is featured below them. The two larger birds are the Scarlet Ibis (left) and the Cocrico (right), the national birds of Trinidad and Tobago. Below the Scarlet Ibis are three hills, representing the Trinity Hills in southern Trinidad, which, it is believed, convinced Columbus to name the island after the Holy Trinity. The island rising out of the waters beneath the Cocrico represents Tobago. Below these birds is the nation's motto, "Together We Aspire, Together We Achieve." The original was designed by Carlyle Chang and George Bailey.

== 2025 revision ==
In August 2024, Prime Minister Keith Rowley announced at the annual convention of the People's National Movement that his government planned to remove Christopher Columbus's sailing ships from the coat of arms (present since their initial adoption in 1962) and replace them with the steelpan drum, the national musical instrument, as part of efforts to remove "colonial vestiges". A bill to do so was passed in the House of Representatives and Senate in January 2025, and received assent from the President of Trinidad and Tobago on 29 January. Gillian Bishop was tasked with the new design, which was unveiled on 19 January 2025. On 21 February 2025 the proclamation was issued giving effect to the new design, which came into use from 25 February 2025.

In December 2025, the government issued an extension for the use of the previous arms until 2 January 2031. In the meantime both the former and new arms are in concurrent use. The new coat of arms design is scheduled to appear on banknotes, starting with the TT$100 note, from August 2026.

== Historical ==
Armorial of Trinidad and Tobago
Emblem	Period of use	Notes
	1889–1958	The badge of the crown-colony depicts the harbour of Port of Spain and mount El Tucuche with two Royal Navy frigate flying the White Ensign and a boat with crew in the foreground. In base is the motto MISCERIQUE PROBAT POPULOS ET FOEDERA JUNGI, chosen by Sir Ralph Abercromby who captured Trinidad from the Spanish in 1797. The motto is quote from Virgil's Aeneid (Book IV, Line 112): ‘Miscerive probet populos, aut foedera iungi ’(He approved of the mingling of peoples and their being joined together by treaties).
	1958–1962	Placed on a heraldic shield with the motto on a ribbon, the badge of Trinidad was adopted by Letters patent of the 13 of October 1958 as the coat of arms of the colony. However the arms was not retained after Independence in 1962.
	1962–	The three gold ships represent the three ships of Christopher Columbus used on his voyage.

== See also ==
- Flag of Trinidad and Tobago
