= Patricia McIntosh =

Politician from Trinidad and Tobago

Member of the House of Representatives for Port of Spain North/Saint Ann's West
- In office 24 May 2010 – 17 June 2015
- Preceded by: Gary Hunt
- Succeeded by: Stuart Young

Personal details
- Born: 28 October 1950 (age 75)
- Party: People's National Movement

Patricia McIntosh (born 28 October 1950) is a Trinidad and Tobago politician from the People's National Movement.

== Career ==
McIntosh was named Woman of the Year 2010 by Advocates for Safe Parenthood Improving Reproductive Equity (ASPIRE). She previously had a career as a teacher.

== See also ==
- List of Trinidad and Tobago Members of Parliament
