= Port of Spain North/Saint Ann's West =

Trinidad and Tobago parliamentary constituency

- Constituency for the Parliament of Trinidad and Tobago
- Port of Spain North/Saint Ann's West is number 5 on this map
- Electorate: 24,123 (2015)
- Major settlements: Port of Spain

Current constituency
- Created: 1991
- Number of members: 1
- Member of Parliament: Stuart Young (PNM)

Port of Spain North/Saint Ann's West is a parliamentary constituency in Trinidad and Tobago. The incumbent MP is former Prime Minister Stuart Young.

== Geography ==
The constituency covers northern areas of the city of Port of Spain and western areas of St. Ann's. It had an electorate of 24,123 as of 2015.

== Members ==
Election	Member	Party	Notes
1991	Desmond E. Allum	PNM	
1995	Gordon Draper	PNM	
2000	John Rahael	PNM	
2001	John Rahael	PNM	
2002	John Rahael	PNM	
2007	Gary Hunt	PNM	
2010	Patricia McIntosh	PNM	
2015	Stuart Young	PNM	
2020	Stuart Young	PNM	
2025	Stuart Young	PNM	

== Elections ==
2025 Trinidad and Tobago general election: Port of Spain North/Saint Ann's West
Party	Candidate	Votes	%	±%
PNM	Stuart Young	7,243	67.0%	▼
PEP	Phillip Edward Alexander	2,597	24.0%	Steady
Independent	Vivian Johnson	478	4.4%	Steady
NTA	Richard Thomas	433	4.1%	Steady
Majority		4,646	43.0%	▼
Turnout		10,809	42.11%	
Registered electors		25,670		
PNM hold				
