= Tobagonian dollar =

Currency of Tobago until 1814

The dollar was the currency of Tobago until 1814. The currency comprised various cut Spanish dollars and countermarked French colonial coins. The dollar was subdivided into 11 bits, each of nine pence. In 1814, sterling was established as the official currency of the island. Since 1905, dollars have once more circulated on Tobago, first the Trinidad and Tobago dollar, then the British West Indies dollar, before the Trinidad and Tobago dollar was reintroduced.

== Coins ==
In 1798, eight-reales coins were holed, with the plug countermarked with a script letter "T" to make 1½ bits coins and the holed dollar issued as 11 bits pieces. Some French colonial coins were countermarked with "TB" to produce 1½ and 2¼ pence pieces.
