= Trinidadian dollar =

Currency of Trinidad until 1814

The dollar was the currency of Trinidad until 1814. The currency comprised various cut Spanish dollars and other Spanish colonial coins. Before 1811, the dollar was worth 8 shillings, each of 12 pence. After 1811, it was worth 9 shillings. In 1814, sterling was established as the official currency of the island. Since 1905, dollars have once more circulated on Trinidad, first the Trinidad and Tobago dollar, then the British West Indies dollar, before the Trinidad and Tobago dollar was reintroduced.

== Coins ==
Between 1798 and 1801, shillings were issued which were segments cut from 8 reales coins. In 1804, quarter and half cut real coins were issued as 3 and 6 pence pieces. In 1811, 8 reales coins had holes cut in them. The plugs were issued as 1 shilling coins, with the holed dollars issued as 9 shillings pieces. All coins were countermarked with an incuse "T".
