= Vishnu Dhanpaul =

Trinidad and Tobago politician

Minister of Finance
- In office 17 March 2025 – 1 May 2025
- Prime Minister: Stuart Young
- Preceded by: Colm Imbert
- Succeeded by: Davendranath Tancoo

Personal details
- Party: People's National Movement

Vishnu Dhanpaul is a politician in Trinidad and Tobago.

== Career ==
In November 2021, he became High Commissioner for Trinidad and Tobago in the United Kingdom. He was also High Commissioner to Canada.

When Stuart Young became prime minister, Dhanpaul was appointed finance minister. He had been permanent secretary in the Ministry of Finance.
