= Eric Williams Plaza =

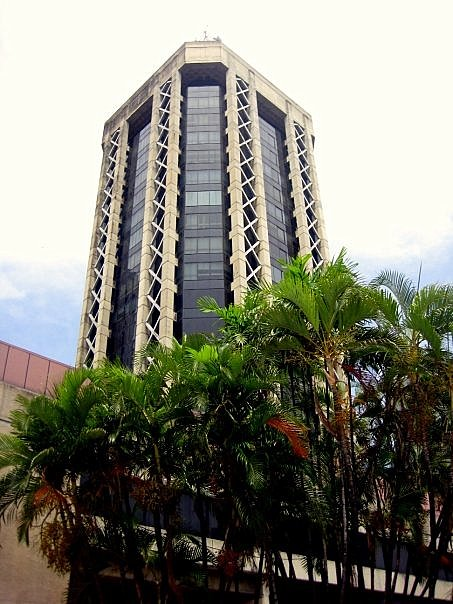
- Eric Williams Plaza in Port of Spain, Trinidad
- Interactive map of the Eric Williams Plaza area

General information
- Type: Office
- Location: Independence Square, Port of Spain, Trinidad, Trinidad and Tobago
- Coordinates: 10.6489°N 61.5124°W
- Construction started: 1979
- Completed: March 26, 1986

Height
- Roof: 92.05 metres (302 ft)

Technical details
- Floor count: 22

Design and construction
- Architect: Anthony C. Lewis Partnership

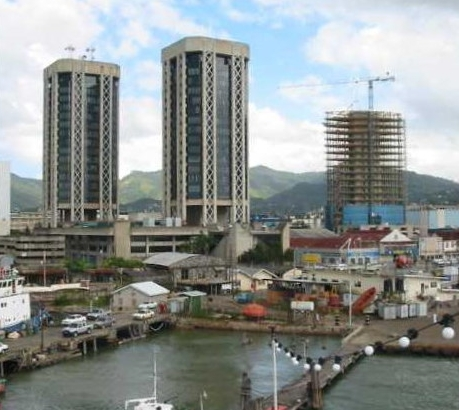
The Eric Williams Plaza, viewed from Port of Spain harbour, December 2002. The Nicholas Tower, now the fifth tallest building in Trinidad and Tobago, is under construction to the right of the image.

Eric Williams Plaza, also known as the Eric Williams Financial Complex, located on Independence Square, Port of Spain, consists of two of the tallest buildings in Trinidad and Tobago, as well as in the English-speaking Caribbean. It consists of a pair of skyscrapers 22 stories high and 302 ft (92 m) tall, locally known as the "Twin Towers". Construction on the complex started in 1979 and ended in 1986. The complex was officially opened on March 29, 1986. The architect who managed the construction was Anthony C. Lewis Partnership.

The Eric Williams Plaza was named after Eric Williams, the first prime minister of Trinidad and Tobago. The first tower houses the Central Bank of Trinidad and Tobago while the second tower houses the Ministry of Finance. The first tower's official name is Eric Williams Financial Tower and the second tower's official name is the Central Bank Tower. The building surrounding the towers is the old Central Bank. The old Central Bank building has gold and currency vaults, administrative areas, an auditorium and a concert hall. It is one of the finest facilities in the country. It is also part of the complex. Both towers contain building security, communications, and life-safety systems.

The towers have an earthquake resistant design. The cross braces and core walls in both towers are designed to take earthquake forces with the former taking 15% of the forces and the latter taking 85%. Additionally, great care was taken in the detailing of the reinforcement. The thickness of the basement under each tower is 25'. The pile cap under each tower is a cellular raft which is a combination of 9' × 6' beams and an 18" slab. Water storage for the complex is located in the basements of the towers.

The building is located on the Brian Lara Promenade, Independence Square (formerly Marine Square) in downtown Port of Spain. It was the tallest building in Trinidad and Tobago until the Nicholas Tower was constructed by businessman Issa Nicholas.

From 1993 to January 1999, the office of the Prime Minister was housed here; in 1999 it was returned to the Whitehall.

== Central Bank Auditorium ==
The Central Bank Auditorium constructed in 1986 still stands as one of the finest facilities of its type in the country. The facility was constructed not only to serve the Bank's needs, but also as a civic contribution aimed at enhancing the performing arts in Trinidad and Tobago.

The Auditorium is located at the South-East corner of the Central Bank building. It has a seating capacity for 400 and provides computerised lighting and sound controls. The Auditorium also boasts of an infra-red listening system designed to facilitate the hearing impaired.

The Lights The lighting system comprises some of the top brand names in the world of theatrical lighting. An ETC Expression 3 Lighting Console is at the head of the system with an array of lighting fixtures by manufacturers such as Colortran, Altman, Rainbow, Clay Paky and ETC Source Fours, High End.

A 96 dimmer per circuit system exists. These circuits are distributed along the balcony rail, side ports, forestage grid and deck.

The Sound The Central Bank Auditorium is at the forefront of the industry, being the only theatre in the country with a Digital Audio Workstation composed of Digidesign and MacIntosh systems. Two Tascam DM24 Digital Consoles head the list of highly professional audio equipment used at the Auditorium. The Auditorium also has an array of microphones, tape machines and amplifiers.

The Auditorium also boasts of an Infra-Red Listening System designed to facilitate the hearing impaired.

The Dressing Rooms Refurbishing of the Dressing Room area has recently been completed, with a more modern layout and comfort to performers. Performances onstage can be monitored in both the Dressing Rooms and Green Room areas via ideally located video and audio monitors. Intercom service is also provided in these areas.

The Facilities Some of the facilities provided with the Auditorium include:

A Steinway Baby Grand Piano, In House Technical Crew, In House Bar Service, Janitorial Service, Security.
