= Stuart Young =

Prime Minister of Trinidad and Tobago in 2025

The Honourable Stuart Young SC MP
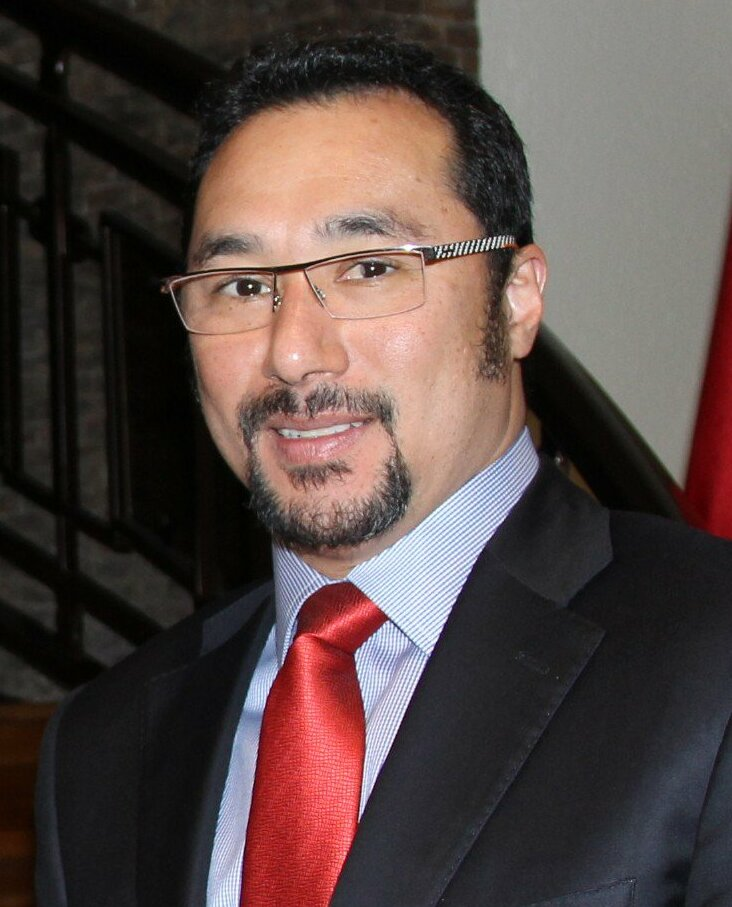
- Young in 2017

8th Prime Minister of Trinidad and Tobago
- In office 17 March 2025 – 1 May 2025
- President: Christine Kangaloo
- Preceded by: Keith Rowley
- Succeeded by: Kamla Persad-Bissessar

Member of Parliament for Port-of-Spain North/St. Ann's West
- Incumbent
- Assumed office 7 September 2015
- Preceded by: Patricia McIntosh

Personal details
- Born: 9 February 1975 (age 51) Port of Spain, Trinidad and Tobago
- Party: People's National Movement
- Education: University of Nottingham

Stuart Richard Young (born 9 February 1975) is a Trinidadian attorney and politician and was the eighth prime minister of Trinidad and Tobago between 17 March and 28 April 2025. As member of the People's National Movement (PNM), he has been a member of parliament (MP) in the House of Representatives for Port-of-Spain North/St. Ann's West since 2015.

He was the minister of energy and energy industries and minister in the office of the prime minister. On 6 January 2025, it was announced Young would be the presumptive nominee to succeed as prime minister in August 2025 when Keith Rowley intends to resign from representational politics. Young has previously held the posts of minister of national security, minister in the Ministry of the Attorney General and Legal Affairs and minister of communications. Young was appointed a senior counsel on 20 June 2024.

Young lead the PNM into the 2025 Trinidad and Tobago general election which was lost to Kamla Persad-Bissessar of the United National Congress (UNC) thus causing Young to be the shortest serving Prime Minister in the history of Trinidad and Tobago. In the aftermath of the election, Young resigned as PNM party chairman on April 30.

== Early life and education ==
Young was born on Henry Street, Port of Spain, on 9 February 1975 to Richard Peter Young, a Chinese Trinidadian, and Priscilla Hosein, an Indo-Trinidadian. He was raised Catholic but his mother is Muslim and grew up on Lal Beharry Trace in Debe. He was the oldest of three children. He attended St Mary's College in Port of Spain, where he was a head altar boy. He considered becoming a priest or accountant but ultimately decided to pursue law at the University of Nottingham in England. While in school he participated in competitive swimming, cycling, and running, as well as being a member of the Trinidad and Tobago Sea Scouts. He was called to the Bar of England and Wales as a junior barrister at Gray's Inn in July 1997. The following year, he received a legal education certificate from the Hugh Wooding Law School and was admitted to the bar in Trinidad and Tobago. He was also admitted to the bars of the Dominica and Antigua and Barbuda.

Young has appeared as counsel in various commissions of enquiry, including the Piarco Commission of Enquiry, the Commission of Enquiry into the Construction Sector and the Commission of Enquiry into the Hindu Credit Union and CL Financial. He served on the American Chamber of Commerce legislative committee, as a board member of FUNDAID, and as a council member of the Law Association of Trinidad and Tobago. He is the chair and a founding member of Synergy Entertainment Network Limited and W.I. Sports Limited.

== Political career ==
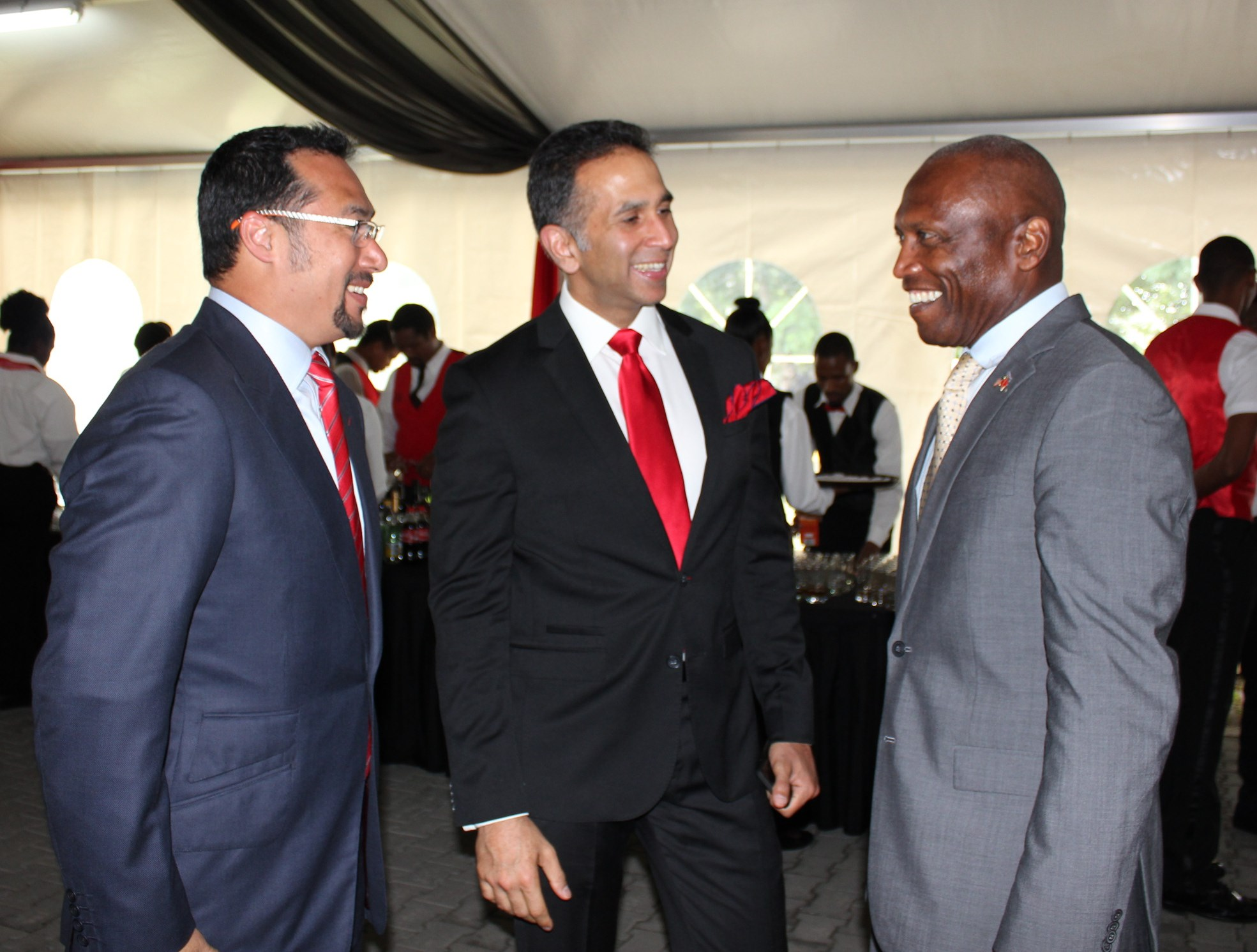
Young (left) with Faris Al-Rawi and John L. Estrada in 2016

Young began his political career on 18 March 2014, serving as a temporary Opposition Senator during the 4th Session of the 10th Republican Parliament. The following year, he was successfully chosen as the PNM candidate to be the member of parliament in the House of Representatives for Port of Spain North/Saint Ann's West. He was elected into office on 7 September 2015. Following the election, he was appointed as a minister in the Ministry of the Attorney General and Legal Affairs on 11 September 2015, a post that he held until 5 August 2018.

On 17 March 2016, he was assigned to the additional position of minister in the office of the prime minister. From 7 June 2018 until 20 July 2019, he was Minister of Communications and from 6 August 2018 until 18 April 2021, he was Minister of National Security. He has been described as the "Minister of Everything". Young also serves as chairman of the Finance & General Purposes Committee of the Cabinet (F&GP), as well as being a member of the National Security Council (NSC), the Energy Standing Committee, the Human Advisory Committee, the Committee of Privileges and the Statutory Instruments Committee.

Young was re-elected to office during the 2020 general election on 10 August 2020. He was appointed to the joint select committee for Energy Affairs and the Cannabis Control Bill, 2020 on 9 November 2020. He was also a co-chair of the Government Empowered Negotiating Team for energy. On 19 April 2021, he was re-assigned as Minister of Energy and Energy Industries to take over from Franklin Khan, who died in office.

In December 2022, Young was elected as the Chairman of the PNM. After the party's defeat in the 2025 general election, Young resigned as party chairman. On 3 January 2025, Prime Minister Keith Rowley announced his intention to resign as prime minister before elections are constitutionally due later this year. On 26 February 2025, Rowley announced he would officially resign from office on 16 March. On 6 January 2025, Young was elected by the PNM Parliamentary caucus as Prime Minister designate. He won with 11 votes to Pennelope Beckles-Robinson's nine. He replaced Rowley on 17 March 2025, becoming Trinidad and Tobago's 8th Prime Minister. After becoming prime minister, a social media post about the incident of him being accused of bullying became popular, and Young responded a few days later saying that bullying in Trinidad and Tobago could not be overlooked. Barry Padarath, the MP for Princes Town, asked Young to apologise. Five hours after assuming his role as prime minister, Young changed Rowley's cabinet. He appointed Vishnu Dhanpaul, the former Trinidadian High Commissioner to Canada, as finance minister. He also replaced Reginald Armour with Camille Robinson-Regis, the former housing minister, as the new attorney general. He also replaced the security minister, Fitzgerald Hinds, with Marvin Gonzales, in turn replacing Robinson-Regis as housing minister with Adrian Leonce. Hassel Bacchus stayed as digital transformation minister, as well as taking on the role of junior finance minister.

On his second day in office, Young advised President Christine Kangaloo to dissolve parliament and call an election for 28 April.

== Electoral history ==
2025 Trinidad and Tobago general election: Port of Spain North/Saint Ann's West
Party	Candidate	Votes	%	±%
PNM	Stuart Young	7,243	67.0%	▼
PEP	Phillip Edward Alexander	2,597	24.0%	Steady
Independent	Vivian Johnson	478	4.4%	Steady
NTA	Richard Thomas	433	4.1%	Steady
Majority		4,646	43.0%	▼
Turnout		10,809	42.11%	
Registered electors		25,670		
PNM hold				

Political offices
Preceded by Keith Rowley	Prime Minister of Trinidad and Tobago; 2025	Succeeded by Kamla Persad-Bissessar
