= Trinidad and Tobago Securities and Exchange Commission =

Securities and exchange commission of Trinidad and Tobago

- Seal of the Trinidad and Tobago Securities and Exchange Commission

Agency overview
- Formed: 1997
- Jurisdiction: Trinidad and Tobago
- Headquarters: Port of Spain, Trinidad and Tobago
- Website: http://www.ttsec.org.tt

The Trinidad and Tobago Securities and Exchange Commission (TTSEC) is the sole regulator of the securities industry in the Republic of Trinidad and Tobago. The commission came into being as a result of the proclamation of the Securities Industry Act in 1997. The commission's role is to foster the orderly development of the securities market.

== History ==
The Securities Industry Act 1995 (SIA, 1995) is the act by which the Trinidad and Tobago Securities and Exchange Commission was established. In December 2012, the SIA 1995 was repealed and replaced by the Securities Act (SA 2012) “an Act to provide protection to investors from unfair, improper or fraudulent practices; foster fair and efficient securities markets and confidence in the securities industry in Trinidad and Tobago; to reduce systemic risk and for other related matters”. The act was proclaimed by the president of the Republic of Trinidad and Tobago on December 28, 2012, and came into operation on December 31, 2012.

== The Securities Act 2012 ==
In late 2009 a Draft Securities Bill (“Draft Bill”) was laid in Parliament for debate.

On December 14, 2009, the commission submitted an application to the International Organization of Securities Commissions (“IOSCO”) to become a signatory to the IOSCO Multilateral Memorandum of Understanding (“MMoU”).

In May 2010, the bill was before a Joint Select Committee of the Senate when Parliament was dissolved and general elections were subsequently announced. By way of letter dated October 18, 2010, IOSCO informed the commission that its application to become a signatory to the IOSCO MMoU was reviewed and the commission was accepted to be listed on Appendix B.

In November 2010, the bill was re-laid before the Joint Select Committee of the Senate. At the IOSCO conference in May 2011, members were informed that by December 31, 2012, the Appendix B listing would cease to exist. Additionally, IOSCO further emphasised that it will no longer allow the two-tiered system of membership which currently exists with some members being on the A list and others on the B list. With effect from January 1, 2013, IOSCO's membership will be strictly based on the country's capacity to meet the requirements associated with being on what is currently IOSCO's A list.

As a result, the decision was made to allow the bill to lapse in June 2011 in order to provide the commission with the opportunity to redraft the bill so as to become compliant with the IOSCO requirements. After this process was completed, the Securities Bill, 2012, was laid in Parliament in November 2012 and the Securities Act, 2012, came into force on December 31, 2012. The commission became a full signatory to the IOSCO MMoU on June 19, 2013.

== Organizational structure ==
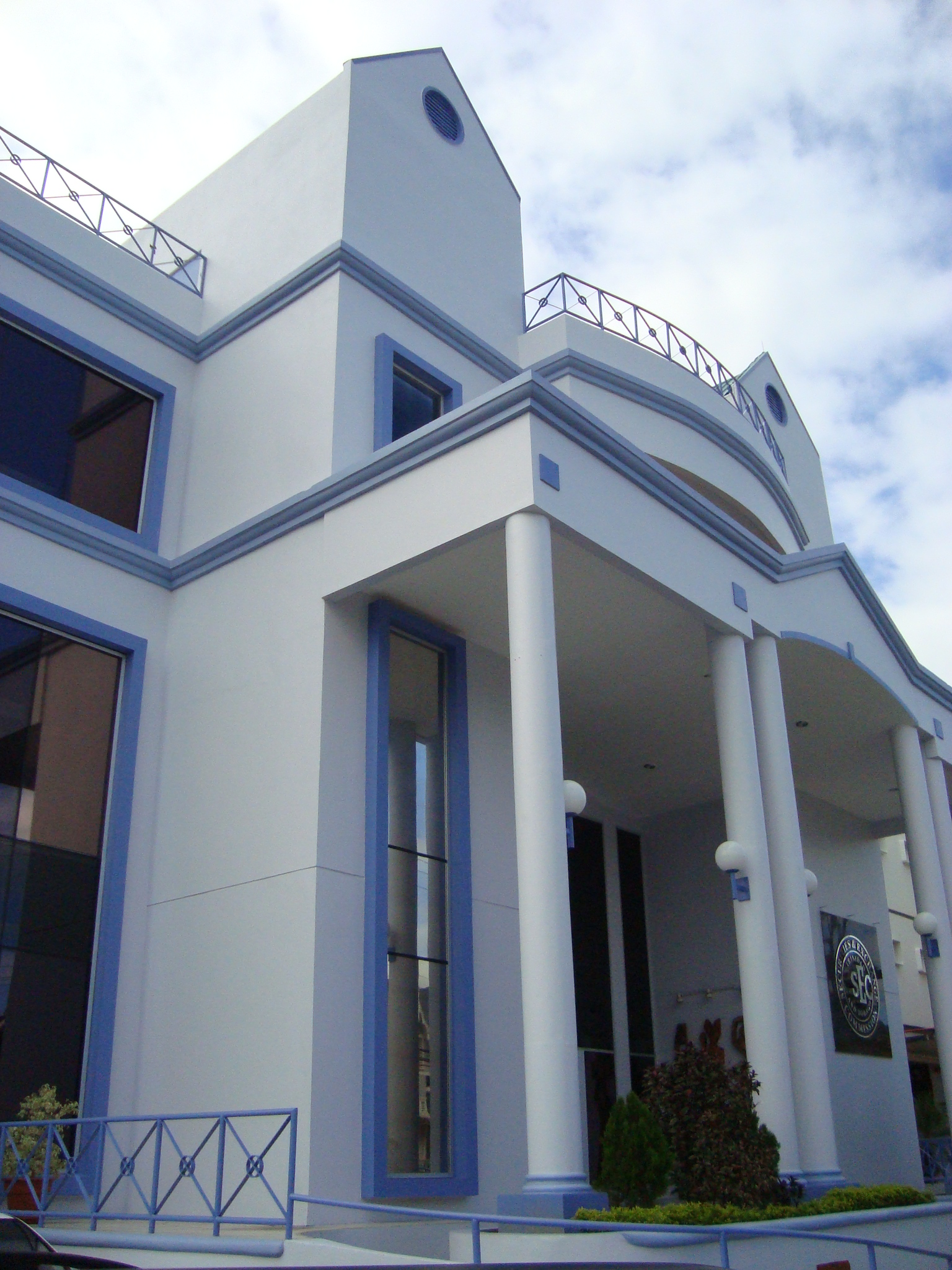
TTSEC building, Port of Spain, Trinidad

The SA 2012 provides for the appointment of no more than nine and no fewer than five commissioners to the board of the commission.

== Functions ==
The commission has four primary functions:

- The registration of all market actors and the securities that they offer. It does this through the Division of Disclosure Registration and Corporate Finance which registers all self-regulatory organizations, securities companies, brokers, dealers, traders, underwriters, issuers and investment advisers as well as the securities that they provide.
- Ensuring orderly, fair and equitable trading in the securities market. The Division of Market Regulation and Surveillance ensures that market actors comply with their continuous disclosure obligations, conducts routine surveillance of stock market activity, conducts investigations of possible breaches of the Securities Act 2012, its by-laws, and relevant provisions of the Companies Act, 1995, and conducts investigations of customer complaints against registered market actors.
- Enforcement of the legislation which governs the functioning of the industry. The commission promotes market integrity by making and enforcing rules through the use of orders, guidelines and by-laws as well as establishing and monitoring standards in the market which include codes of conduct, prudential criteria and corporate governance. The Division of Legal Advisory and Enforcement focuses on the commission's corporate strategic and tactical legal initiatives as well as the management of its legal function.
- Ensuring investor protection and instilling investor confidence. In accordance with the International Organization of Securities Commissions’ (IOSCO) principles, the commission conducts an investor education programme designed to provide investors and potential investors with suitable information to guide informed decisions. These tasks are facilitated through the Division of Corporate Communications, Education and Information, which promotes informed investor decisions and the TTSEC's role as regulator through corporate communications and public education.

Other divisions which support the commission's mandate are:

- Human Resource Management Division
- Policy Research and Planning Division
- Information Management Division
- Corporate Services Division

== See also ==
- Central Bank of Trinidad and Tobago
- Trinidad and Tobago Stock Exchange
- Caribbean Financial Action Task Force
- List of financial supervisory authorities by country
