= Independence Square (Port of Spain) =

Square in Port of Spain, Trinidad and Tobago

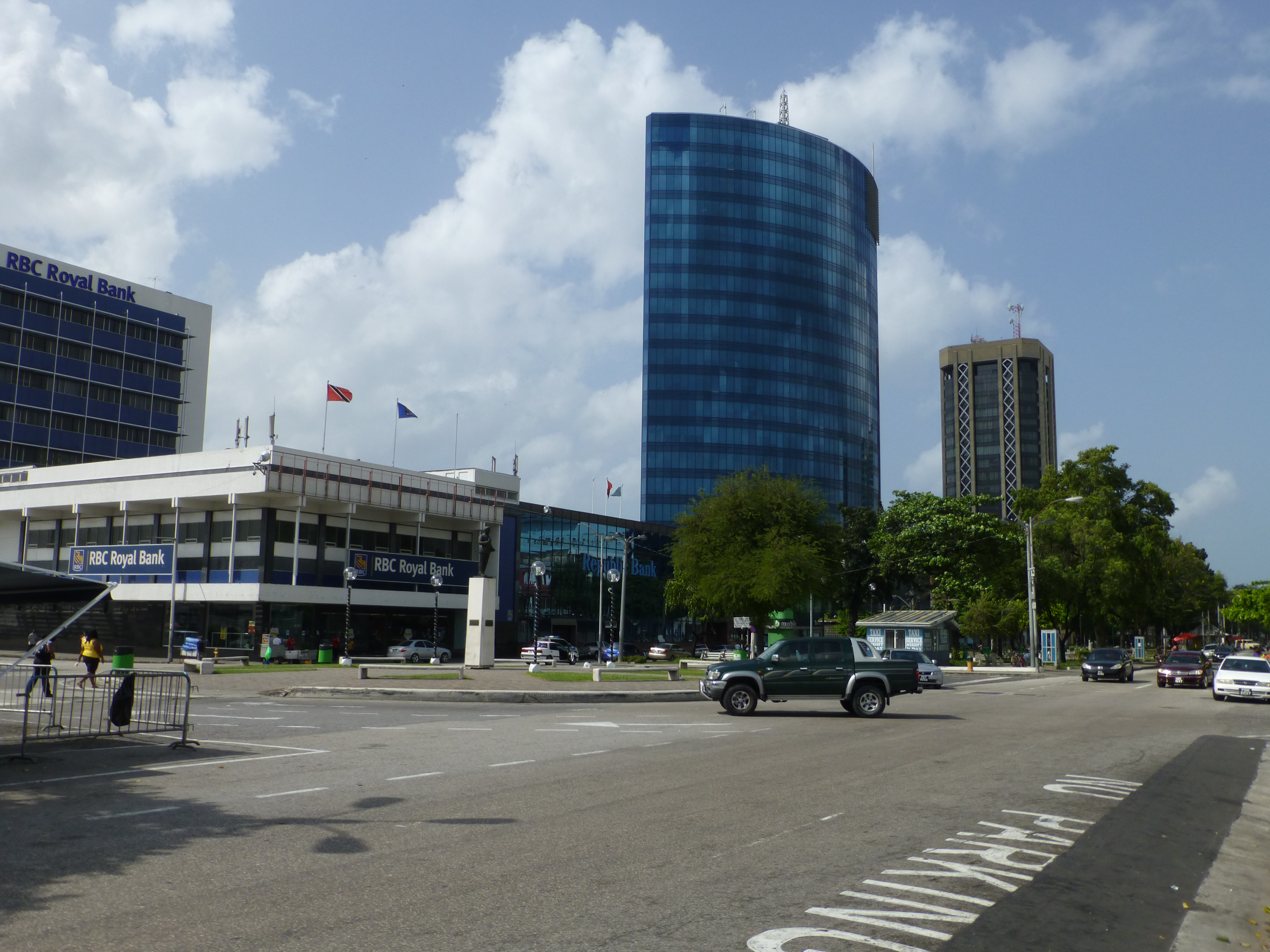
Independence Square

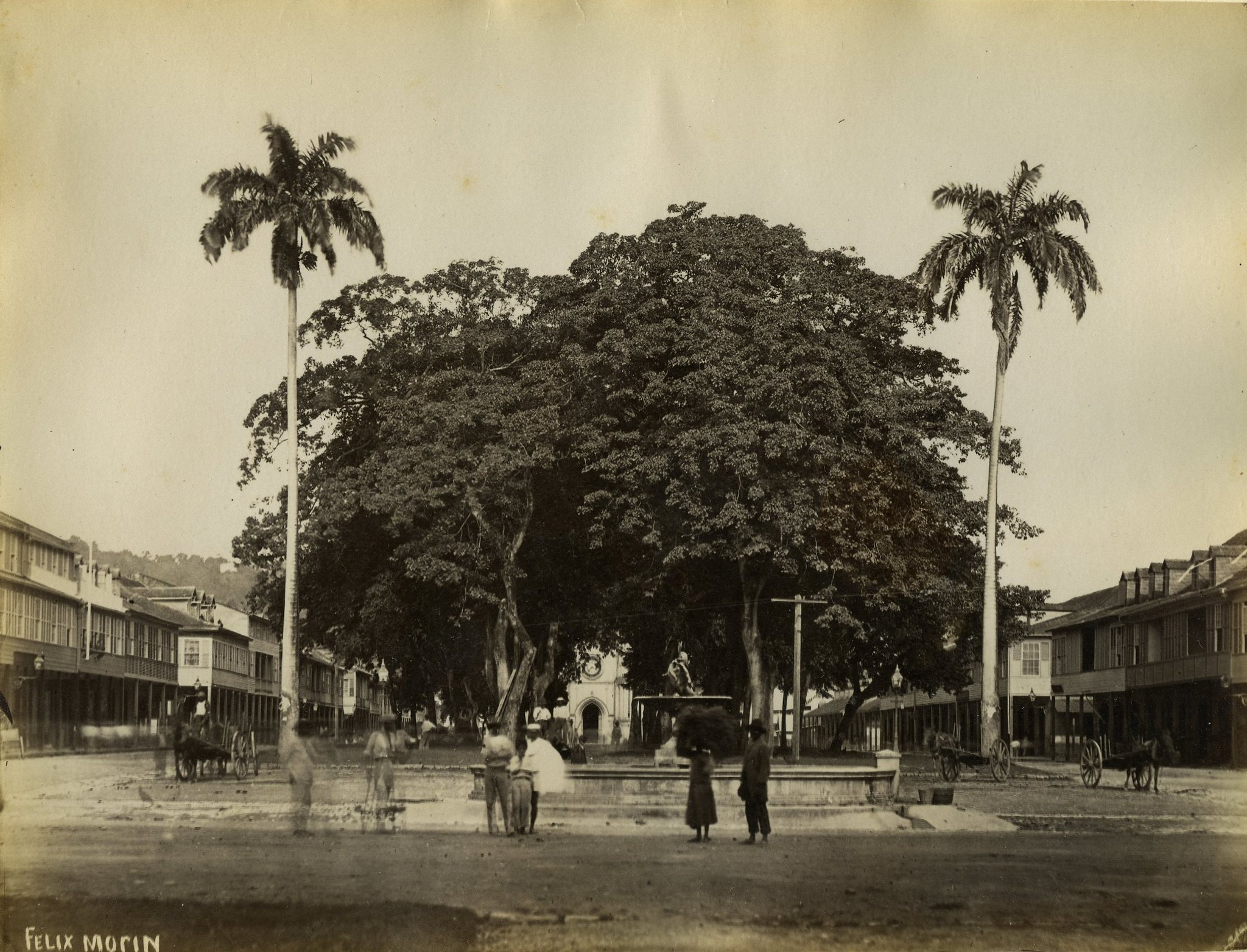
Marine Square (end of 19th century)

Independence Square lies near to the southern end of Port of Spain, Trinidad and Tobago. Formerly named Marine Square, it was renamed in honour of Trinidad and Tobago's independence from the United Kingdom in 1962. The Square runs from east to west and is bounded on the north side by King Street (the southern street bears the name of the square). The Roman Catholic Cathedral of the Immaculate Conception lies at the eastern end of the Square (although the roadways bounding the square continue past the cathedral). The western portion of the Square forms the Brian Lara Promenade. The square was constructed on reclaimed land at the waterfront and was originally called Plaza de la Marina. When the British captured Trinidad in 1797 they translated the name to Marine Square.

Some of the tallest buildings in the country, the Nicholas Tower and the Eric Williams Plaza are located on the southern side of Independence Square.
