= Nicholas Tower =

Coordinates: 10.6492°N 61.5108°W

Nicholas Towers
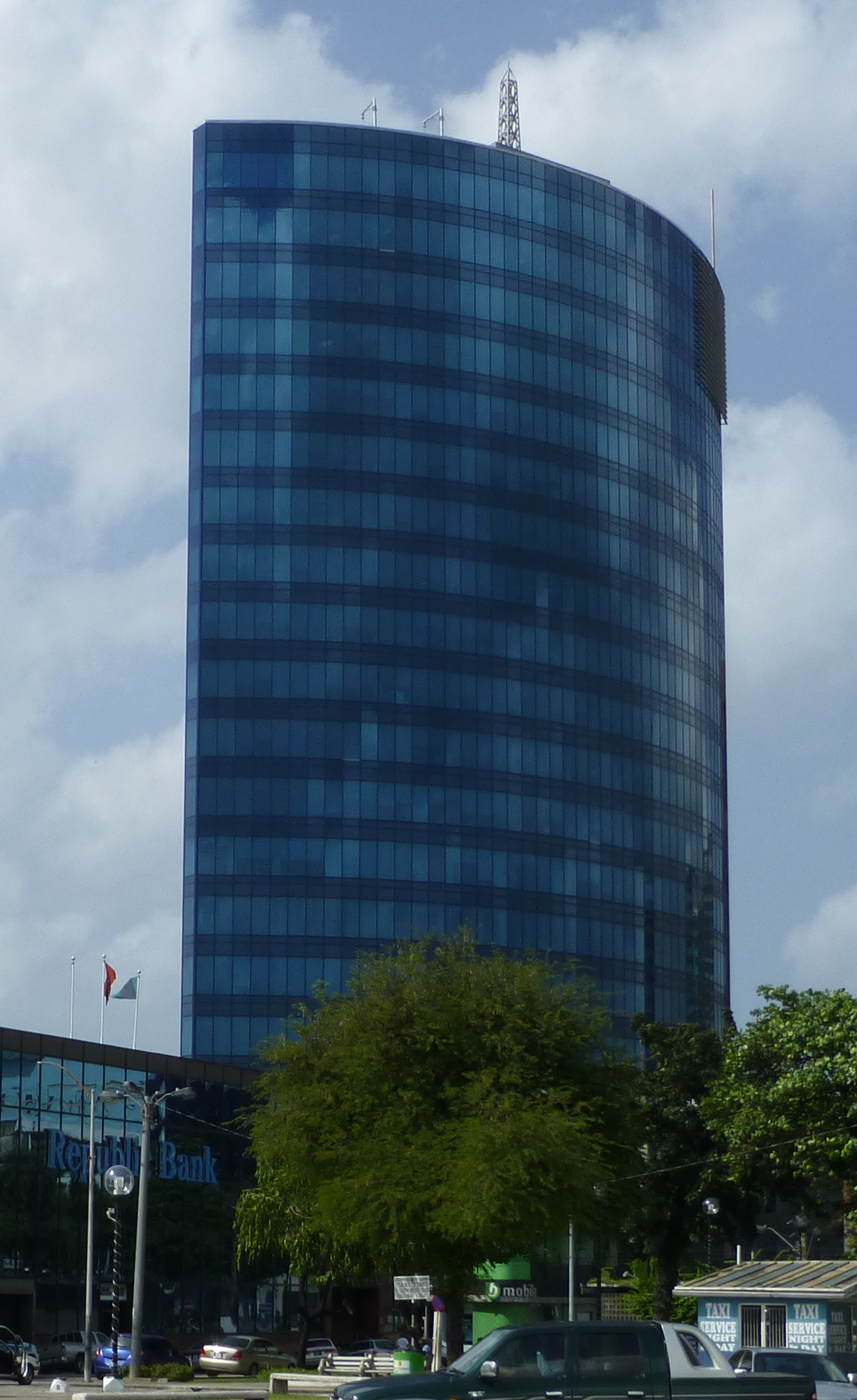
- Interactive map of the Nicholas Towers area

General information
- Type: Office
- Location: Independence Square, Port of Spain, Trinidad, Trinidad and Tobago
- Construction started: 2002
- Completed: 2003

Height
- Roof: 88 metres (289 ft)

Technical details
- Floor count: 21

Design and construction
- Architect: Ellerbe Becket (Merged with AECOM in 2009)

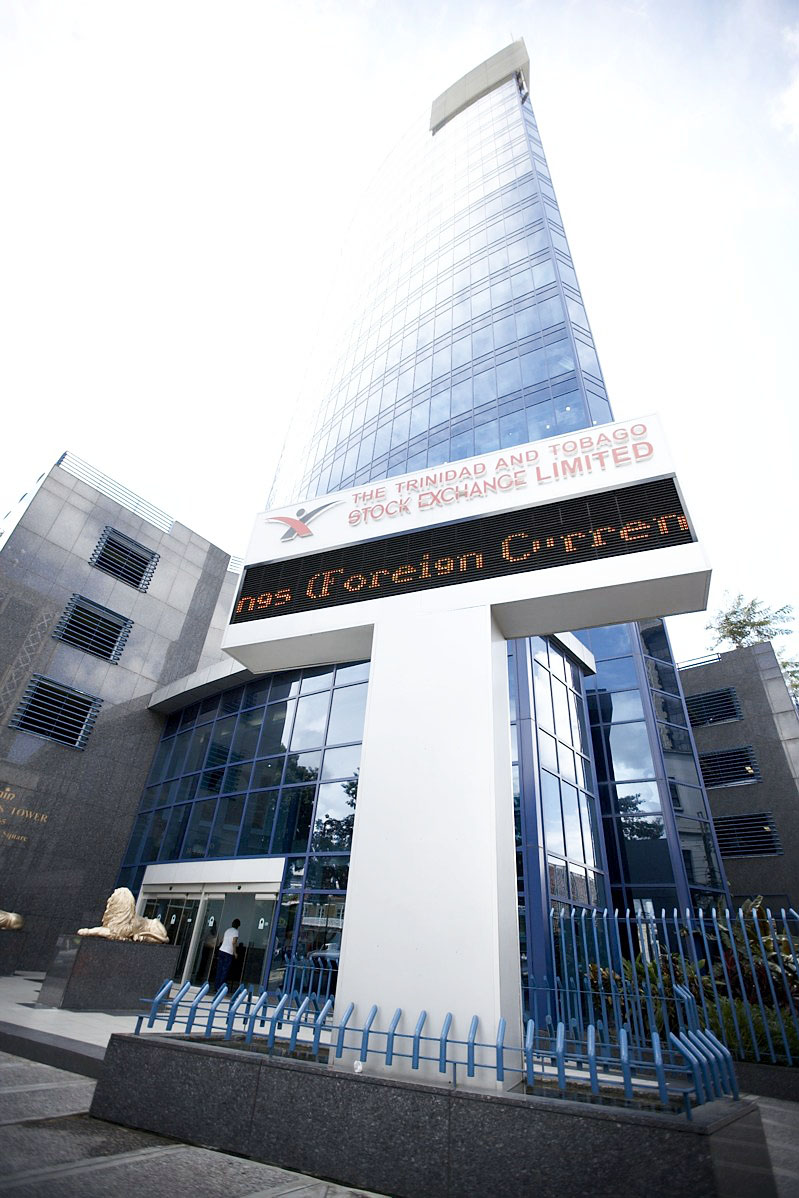
Nicholas Towers, North Face

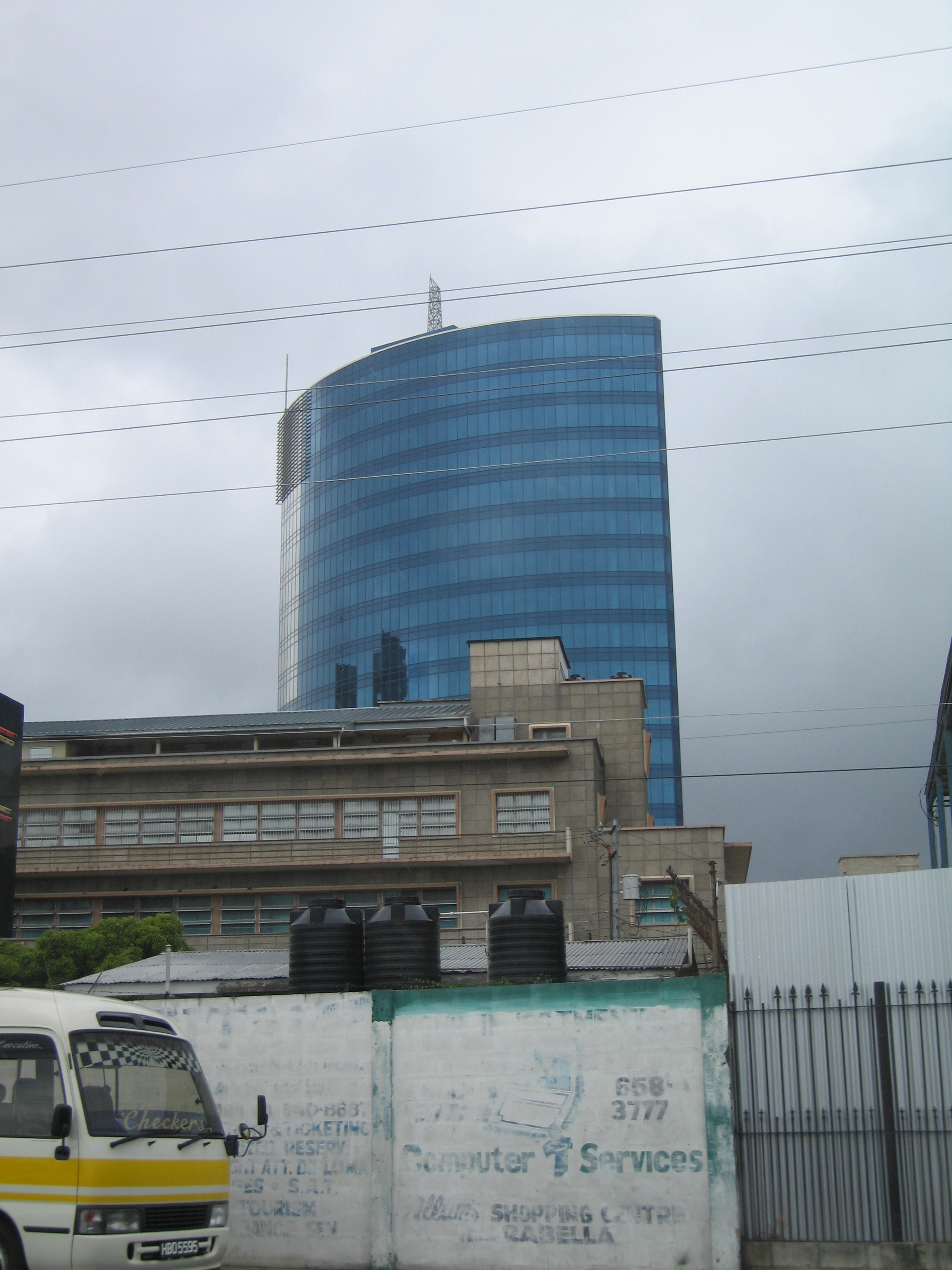
Nicholas Towers

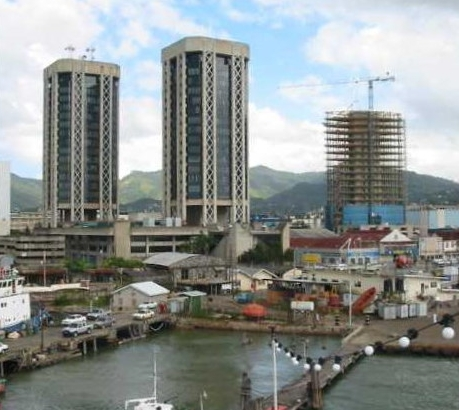
Port of Spain, viewed from the harbour, December 2002. Nicholas Towers, then under construction, is to the right of the image.

Nicholas Towers, situated on Independence Square, Port of Spain, Trinidad and Tobago is the fifth tallest building in Trinidad and Tobago. It has an elliptical floor plate and stands 21 floors tall and 88 Meters high. Construction was completed in 2003 and each floor, 8,000 square feet (700 m^{2}) of space, was rented out at a cost of $96,000 a month (as of 2005). It is a blue glass tower.

The building was constructed on the site of the Trinidad Union Club, a 136-year-old private club which occupied the penthouse suite of the Nicholas Towers until 2015. Major tenants of Nicholas Towers include:

- The Trinidad and Tobago Stock Exchange, a former tenant of the old Union Club building (as of 2023)
- Caribbean Airlines (The national airline of Trinidad and Tobago)
- American Airlines
- Continental Airlines
- Ministry of Trade and Industry
- Ministry of Community Development, Culture and the Arts
- Office of the Prime Minister
- InvesTT (former tenant)
- Economic Diversification Board (EDB) of the Ministry of Planning
- Flow
- MoneyGram
