= Unit Trust Corporation =

Trinidadian company

The Trinidad and Tobago Unit Trust Corporation (UTC) is a mutual fund company based in Port of Spain, Trinidad and Tobago. Founded in 1981 through an Act of Parliament, the company describes itself as "the leading mutual fund company in the Caribbean". The UTC dominates the mutual fund market in Trinidad and Tobago.
