= Trinidad and Tobago dollar =

Currency

- Obverse face of the different denominations of Trinidadian and Tobagonian banknotes.

ISO 4217
- Code: TTD (numeric: 780)
- Subunit: 0.01

Units of account
- Base unit: dollar
- Plural: dollars
- Symbol: $
- Subunit
- 1/100: cent
- Plural
- cent: cents
- Symbol
- cent: ¢

Denominations
- Banknotes: $1, $5, $10, $20, $50, $100
- Coins
- Freq. used: 5¢, 10¢, 25¢
- Rarely used: 50¢, $1

Demographics
- User(s): Trinidad and Tobago

Issuance
- Central bank: Central Bank of Trinidad and Tobago
- Website: www.central-bank.org.tt

Valuation
- Inflation: 5.8% (December 2022)

The Trinidad and Tobago dollar (currency code TTD; symbol: $; abbreviation TT$) is the currency of Trinidad and Tobago. The dollar is the base unit; each is subdivided into 100 cents. Cents are abbreviated with the cent sign (¢, or TT¢ internationally). Its predecessor currencies are the Trinidadian dollar and the Tobagonian dollar.

== History ==
The history of currency in the former British colony of Trinidad and Tobago closely follows that of the British Eastern Caribbean territories in general. The first currency used was the Spanish dollar, also known as "pieces of eight", which began circulating in the 16th century. Proposals for establishing banks in the West Indies, targeted at landowners, were made in 1661 by the British government, and in 1690 by Sir Thomas Dalby. Despite this, and Queen Anne's proclamation of 1704 that brought the pound sterling currency system to the West Indies, silver pieces of eight (Spanish dollars and later Mexican dollars) continued to form a major portion of the circulating currency right into the latter half of the nineteenth century.

The abolition of slavery in the West Indies was the catalyst which led to the establishing of the first bank. The Colonial Bank was established on 1 June 1836, and opened its first branch in Trinidad in 1837 under the management of Anthony Cumming. Its initial mandate was to use Spanish and Mexican dollars as its official currency, and it was required to make all payments in those currencies, but incoming payments could be made in any currency, and the bank often found that it was short of dollars. The bank therefore lobbied the government, seeking permission to issue money in other currencies. This resulted in an imperial order-in-council in 1838, in which Trinidad and Tobago formally adopted the sterling currency, although the Spanish, Mexican and Colombian currencies were also declared legal tender.

A second bank, the West India Bank, was granted a royal charter in 1840, and opened its first branch in 1843. The loss of its monopoly had a profound effect on the Colonial Bank, which was also at a disadvantage due to not being permitted to pay interest on deposits, as the West India Bank did. The two banks pursued opposite strategies, with the Colonial Bank maintaining a conservative stance, including removing currency from circulation, while the West India Bank pursued aggressive expansion. The Sugar Duties Act 1846, which equalised the duties on sugar imported into the United Kingdom from the British colonies with that of non-British territories, created a financial crisis in Trinidad and Tobago as the price of sugar fell rapidly. The West India Bank, which had taken on too much risk, went bust during the crisis and the Colonial Bank was also put under strain.

The international silver crisis of 1873 signalled the end of the silver dollar era in the West Indies and silver dollars were demonetized in Tobago in 1879 and in Trinidad at around the same period. This left a state of affairs, in which the British coinage circulated, being reckoned in the private sector using dollar accounts at an automatic conversion rate of 1 dollar = 4 shillings 2 pence. Local banks also issued their own dollars, however, denominated in dollars. Government offices kept their accounts in British pounds, shillings, and pence until the year 1935. The Currency Interpretation Ordinance of 1934 replaced the system of pounds, shillings and pence with the dollar, retaining the fixed exchange rate of 1 dollar for every 4 shillings 2 pence.

From 1949, with the introduction of the British West Indies dollar, the currency of Trinidad and Tobago became officially tied up with that of the British Eastern Caribbean territories in general. The British sterling coinage was eventually replaced by a new decimal coinage in 1955, with the new cent being equal to one half of the old penny. In 1951, notes of the British Caribbean Territories, Eastern Group, were introduced, replacing Trinidad and Tobago's own notes. In 1955, coins were introduced when the dollar was decimalized.

2006 Series of the Trinidad and Tobago dollar

The currency of the union was replaced by the modern Trinidad and Tobago dollar in 1964, two years after the nation's independence in 1962. The Trinidad and Tobago dollar was launched, and had become the sole currency by 1967.

In 1964, Trinidad and Tobago introduced its own dollar. Between 1964 and 1968 the Trinidad and Tobago dollar was utilized in Grenada as legal tender until that country rejoined the common currency arrangements of the East Caribbean dollar. The Trinidad and Tobago dollar and the Eastern Caribbean dollar were the last two currencies in the world to retain the old rating of one pound equals four dollars and eighty cents, as per the gold sovereign to the Pieces of eight. Both of these currencies ended this relationship within a few weeks of each other in 1976.

After VAT was introduced in 1989, the dollar was switched from a fixed rate to a managed float regime on Easter Weekend, 1993. For a wider outline of the history of currency in the region, see Currencies of the British West Indies.

== Coins ==
In 1966, coins were introduced in denominations of 1¢, 5¢, 10¢, 25¢ & 50¢. A large sized $1 coin was first released for circulation in 1969 and again in 1979 before being replaced with a smaller sized version in 1995 more regularly minted. The 5¢ is struck in bronze, with the other denominations in cupro-nickel. The obverses all feature Trinidad and Tobago's coat of arms, with the reverse designs solely featuring the denomination until 1976, when they were replaced by either a national bird or flower in addition to the denomination after the declaration of a republic. The 50¢ & $1 coins are scarcely seen in circulation, but can be purchased from banks if requested.

There are also coins minted in $5, $10, $100 and $200 denominations as well. These coins are not in circulation, and can only be obtained from the Central Bank of Trinidad and Tobago, either as part of a special 'eight-coin proof set' collection (in the case of the $5 and $10 coins) or individually (in the case of the $100 and $200 coins.) Notably, the $5 and $10 coins are minted in sterling silver, whereas the $100 and $200 are minted in gold. The price of the gold coins fluctuate depending on the current state of the market for gold.

In 2014 the government stopped minting the 1¢ coin. On 3 July 2018 cash rounding was implemented as 1¢ coins ceased being legal tender for cash payments, but the Central Bank will redeem them indefinitely in multiples of 5¢.

Coins of the Trinidad and Tobago dollar
Image	Value	Technical parameters				Description			Date of first minting
Image	Value	Diameter	Thickness	Mass	Composition	Edge	Obverse	Reverse	Date of first minting
	1 cent	17.78 mm	1.14 mm	1.94 g	Bronze	Plain/Smooth	Coat of arms of Trinidad and Tobago; text "REPUBLIC OF TRINIDAD AND TOBAGO"	Hummingbird; text "1 CENT"	1976
	5 cents	21.21 mm	1.35 mm	3.24 g	Bronze	Plain/Smooth	Coat of arms of Trinidad and Tobago; text "REPUBLIC OF TRINIDAD AND TOBAGO"	Greater bird-of-paradise (Paradisaea apoda); text "5 CENTS"	1976
	5 cents	21.2 mm	1.25 mm	3.31 g	Copper-plated steel	Plain/Smooth	Coat of arms of Trinidad and Tobago; text "REPUBLIC OF TRINIDAD AND TOBAGO"	Greater bird-of-paradise (Paradisaea apoda); text "5 CENTS"	2017
	10 cents	16.26 mm	1.02 mm	1.41 g	Copper-nickel	Reeded	Coat of arms of Trinidad and Tobago; text "REPUBLIC OF TRINIDAD AND TOBAGO"	Flaming Hibiscus; text "10 CENTS"	1976
	10 cents	16.3 mm	0.9 mm	1.4 g	Copper-nickel-plated steel	Reeded	Coat of arms of Trinidad and Tobago; text "REPUBLIC OF TRINIDAD AND TOBAGO"	Flaming Hibiscus; text "10 CENTS"	2017
	25 cents	20 mm	1.63 mm	3.53 g	Copper-nickel	Reeded	Coat of arms of Trinidad and Tobago; text "REPUBLIC OF TRINIDAD AND TOBAGO"	Chaconia (Warszewiczia coccinea or Wild Poinsettia); text "25 CENTS"	1976
	25 cents	20 mm	1.48 mm	3.5 g	Copper-nickel-plated steel	Reeded	Coat of arms of Trinidad and Tobago; text "REPUBLIC OF TRINIDAD AND TOBAGO"	Chaconia (Warszewiczia coccinea or Wild Poinsettia); text "25 CENTS"	2017
	50 cents	26 mm	1.85 mm	7 g	Copper-nickel	Reeded	Coat of arms of Trinidad and Tobago; text "REPUBLIC OF TRINIDAD AND TOBAGO"	Steel drums; text "50 CENTS"	1976

== Banknotes ==
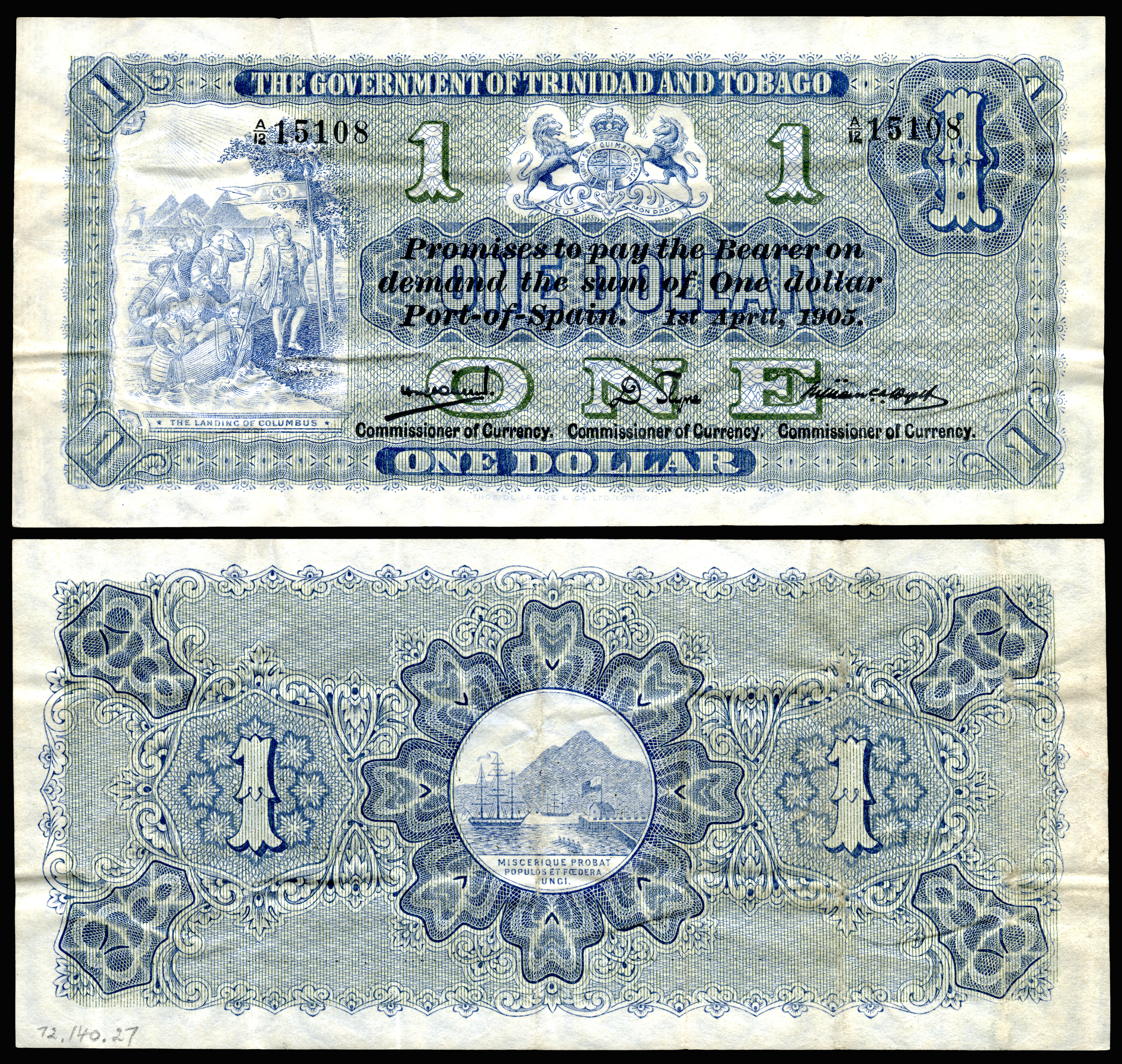
First government issue one-dollar note (1905).

In the nineteenth century, the British gold sovereign was valued at four Spanish silver dollars and eighty cents. When the sterling coinage was finally accepted as the main circulating coinage in the British West Indies, the Eastern Caribbean colonies continued nevertheless to use the dollar unit for accounting purposes. The West Indian dollar was therefore equivalent to four shillings and two pence.

This Royal Bank of Canada note reflects this state of affairs with its overt mention of the fact that one hundred dollars is equal to twenty pounds, sixteen shillings, and eight pence sterling. This state of affairs was exclusively confined to the Eastern Caribbean region, possibly due to the geographical proximity to British Guiana. British Guiana had a reason to wish to retain the dollar unit owing to its recent changeover from Dutch currency. These factors did not affect Jamaica, Bermuda, or the Bahamas which adopted the sterling currency in both coinage and as the unit of account.

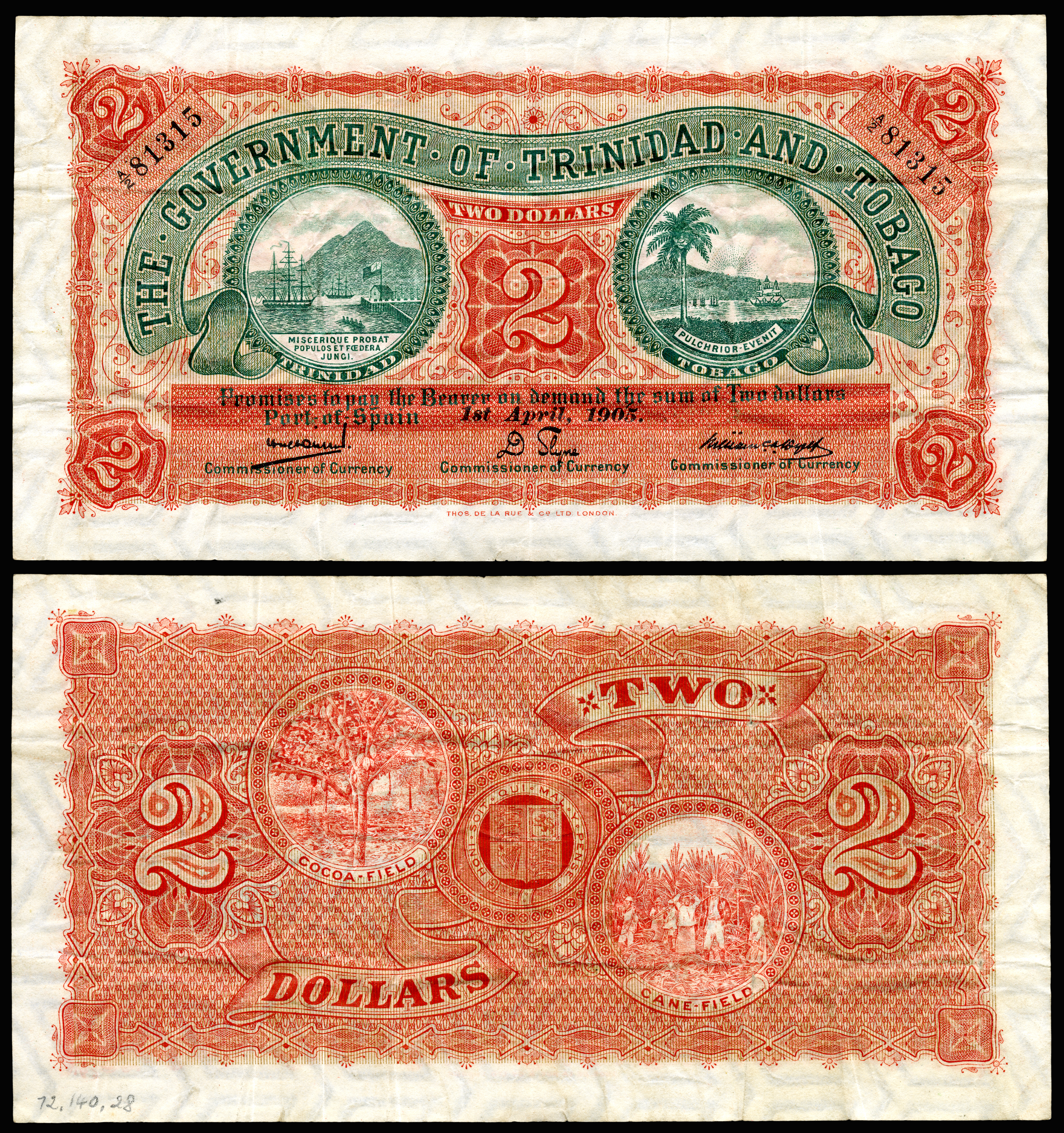
First government issue two-dollar note (1905).

In 1898, the Colonial Bank introduced $20 notes. These were followed in 1901 by $5. $100 notes were also issued. The last notes were issued in 1926, after which the Colonial Bank was taken over by Barclays Bank, which issued $5, $20 & $100 notes until 1941. In 1905, notes were introduced by the government in denominations of $1 & $2, followed by $5 in 1935, followed by $10 & $20 in 1942.

The Royal Bank of Canada introduced $5, $20 & $100 notes in 1909. From 1920, the notes also bore the denomination in sterling. 100-dollar notes were not issued after 1920, whilst the $5 and $20 were issued until 1938. The Canadian Bank of Commerce introduced $5, $20 & $100 notes in 1921, with the $5 & $20 notes issued until 1939. The Royal Bank of Canada one hundred dollar note, shown here; is a relic of a monetary system, in which the unit of account was related to the circulating coinage on the basis of two historical coins which were no longer in use.

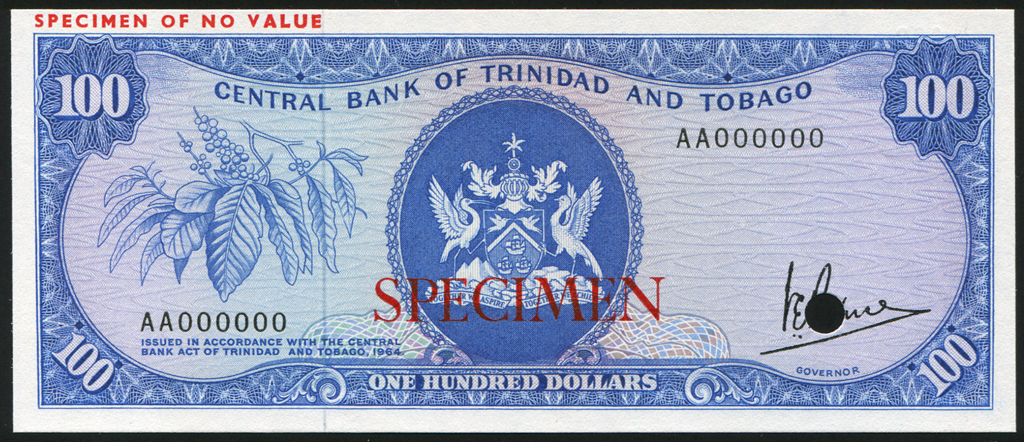
Trinidad and Tobago 100 Dollars banknote of 1964

On 14 December 1964, the Central Bank of Trinidad and Tobago introduced notes for $1, $5, $10 & $20. New denominations in the form of $50 & $100 notes were issued on 6 June 1977, although the $50 note was not continued after a shipment was stolen prior to issue. The $50 note was taken out of its brief circulation. The reverses of the current notes feature the Central Bank Building of Trinidad & Tobago. The obverses have the coat of arms in the center, a national bird and a place in Trinidad, such as a market, petroleum refinery, etc. In 2002, new $1 & $20 notes were introduced. In 2003, new $1, $5, $10 & $100 were also introduced. The notes were only slightly changed; they now have more security features & darker colour. Recently, more security features have been added to the notes by the Central Bank of Trinidad and Tobago. In 2012 the $50 note was reintroduced to commemorate Trinidad and Tobago's Golden Jubilee of Independence. On the front of the note is a Red-capped cardinal bird and the commemorative text around the center of the coat of arms. Two versions of this denomination were released, one without the commemorative text around the centre of the coat of arms (general circulation) and one with the commemorative text.

Trinidad and Tobago revised 50 Dollar bill 2015

On 9 December 2019 polymer $100 notes were distributed to banks. The government announced that the current $100 notes would be demonetized after 31 December 2019.

On 21 February 2020, the central bank announced plans to change all of its paper based notes to polymer based notes.

On 27 October 2020, the central bank introduced polymer versions of the $5, $10 and $20 notes. These notes were distributed to commercial banks on 2 November 2020. They also announced that the polymer notes of the $1 and $50 would be introduced in January 2021.

On 15 February 2021, the central bank introduced a polymer version of the $1 and a redesigned polymer $50 note. The paper based notes were discontinued on January 1, 2022.

All banknotes have the coat of arms of Trinidad and Tobago on the obverse and an image of the central bank on the reverse.

Banknotes in circulation are

- $1 (red)
- $5 (green)
- $10 (grey)
- $20 (purple)
- $50 (gold)
- $100 (blue)

Current TTD exchange rates
From Google Finance:	AUD CAD CHF CNY EUR GBP HKD JPY USD EUR JPY USD
From Yahoo! Finance:	AUD CAD CHF CNY EUR GBP HKD JPY USD EUR JPY USD
From XE.com:	AUD CAD CHF CNY EUR GBP HKD JPY USD EUR JPY USD
From OANDA:	AUD CAD CHF CNY EUR GBP HKD JPY USD EUR JPY USD

== See also ==
- Central banks and currencies of the Caribbean
- Economy of Trinidad and Tobago
