= 2018 in Trinidad and Tobago =

- Decades: 1990s; 2000s; 2010s; 2020s
- See also: Other events of 2018; Timeline of Trinidadian and Tobagonian history

Events in the year 2018 in Trinidad and Tobago.

== Incumbents ==
- President: Anthony Carmona (until 19 March); Paula-Mae Weekes (from 19 March)
- Prime Minister: Keith Rowley
- Chief Justice: Ivor Archie

== Events ==
- 19 January – Paula-Mae Weekes is elected new president

== Deaths ==
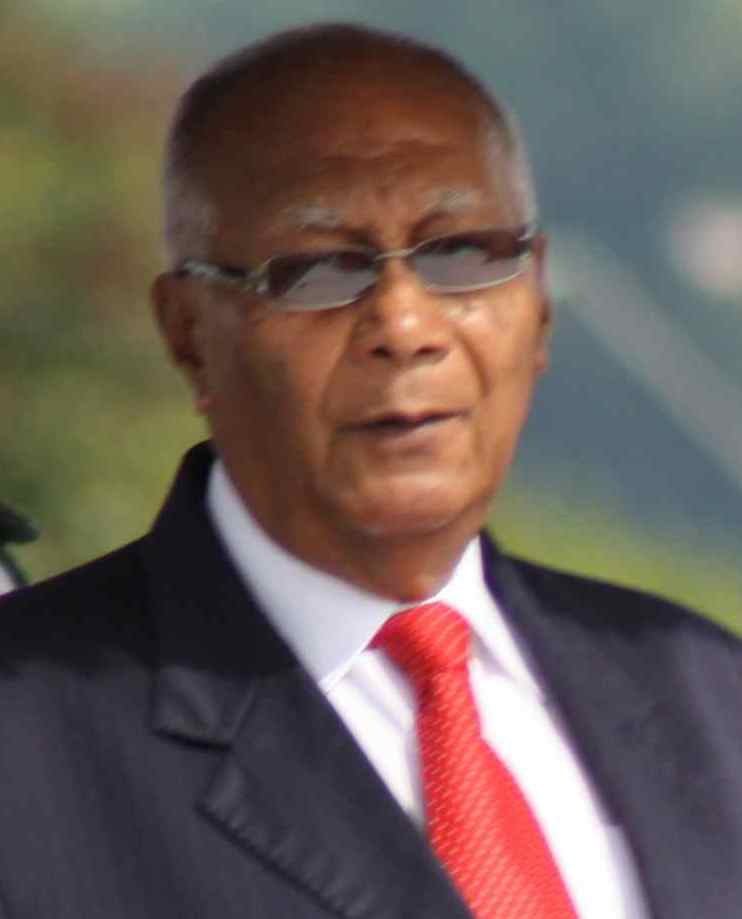
George Maxwell Richards

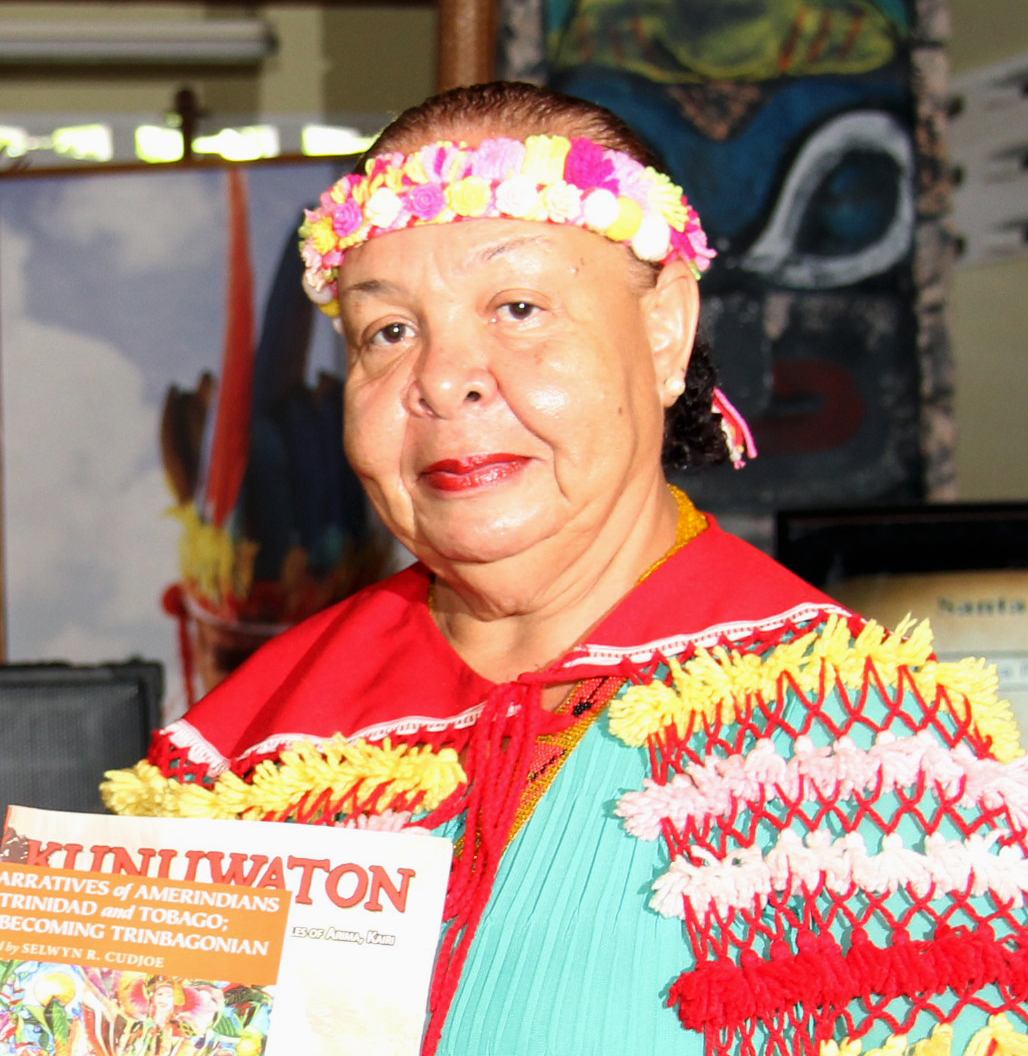
Carib Queen Jennifer Cassar

- 2 January – Donna Carter, politician (born c.1944).
- 8 January – George Maxwell Richards, politician, former president (b. 1931).
- 1 July – Ayanna Dyette, volleyball player (b. 1986).
- 19 July – Jennifer Cassar, indigenous leader (Santa Rosa First Peoples Community) and civil servant, Carib Queen (b. 1951).
