= 2021 in Trinidad and Tobago =

- Decades: 2000s; 2010s; 2020s
- See also: Other events of 2021; Timeline of Trinidadian and Tobagonian history

Events in the year 2021 in Trinidad and Tobago.

== Incumbents ==
- President: Paula-Mae Weekes
- Prime Minister: Keith Rowley
- Chief Justice: Ivor Archie

== Events ==
Ongoing — COVID-19 pandemic in Trinidad and Tobago

=== Scheduled events ===
- Due in 2021 – The 2021 Tobago House of Assembly election.
- January 2021 Tobago House of Assembly election
- December 2021 Tobago House of Assembly election

== Deaths ==
- January 22 – Clifton De Coteau, politician.
- January 28 – Singing Sandra, 64, calypso singer.
- March 28 – Louise Horne, 108, politician and nutritionist, senator (1976–1991).
- April 10 – Mike Olton, 82, Trinidadian-born English cricketer (Kent, Trinidad national team).
- April 17 – Franklin Khan, politician.
- May 25 – Torrance Mohammed, 90, dancer and politician.
- July 13 – Brother Resistance, 66–67, musician and poet.
- October 21 – Yasin Abu Bakr, 80, religious leader and insurgent.
