= 2022 in Trinidad and Tobago =

- Decades: 2000s; 2010s; 2020s
- See also: Other events of 2022; Timeline of Trinidadian and Tobagonian history

Events in the year 2022 in Trinidad and Tobago.

== Incumbents ==
- President: Paula-Mae Weekes
- Prime Minister: Keith Rowley
- Chief Justice: Ivor Archie
- Leader of the Opposition: Kamla Persad-Bissessar

== Events ==
Ongoing — COVID-19 pandemic in Trinidad and Tobago

- July 2 – Tropical Storm Bonnie: One person is reported missing as Tropical Storm Bonnie makes landfall in South America.

== Deaths ==
- January 1 – Mighty Bomber, 93, calypsonian.
- January 2 – Kenny J, 69, calypsonian and Assistant Commissioner of Police.
- January 6 – Clive Zanda, 82, jazz musician.
- January 10 – Deon Lendore, 29, sprinter, Olympic bronze medallist (2012), traffic collision.
- February 27 – Sonny Ramadhin, 92, West Indies cricketer.
- March 12 – Selwyn Ryan, 86, Trinidad and Tobago political scientist.
- October 7 – Austin Stoker, 92, actor
- October 16 – Malcolm Patrick Galt, 93, Trinidadian-born Barbadian Roman Catholic prelate, bishop of Bridgetown (1995–2005).
- December 7 – Herbert Volney, 69, jurist and politician,
- December 28 – Black Stalin, 81 calypso musician.
