= 2019 in Trinidad and Tobago =

- Decades: 1990s; 2000s; 2010s; 2020s
- See also: Other events of 2019; Timeline of Trinidadian and Tobagonian history

Events in the year 2019 in Trinidad and Tobago.

== Incumbents ==
- President: Paula-Mae Weekes
- Prime Minister: Keith Rowley
- Chief Justice: Ivor Archie

== Events ==
- 2 December – 2019 Trinidadian local elections

== Deaths ==
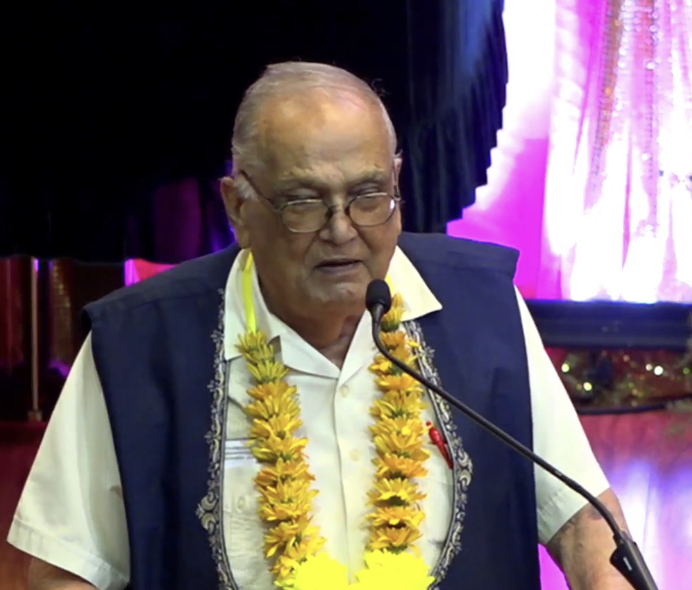
Satnarayan Maharaj

- 16 May – Dexter St. Louis, table tennis player (b. 1968).
- 30 May – Jason Marcano, footballer (b. 1983).
- 15 July – Raymond Choo Kong, actor (b. 1949).
- 12 September – Linda Baboolal, politician (b. 1941).
- 3 October – Percy Lewis, Trinidadian-born British Olympic boxer (b. 1928).
- 9 October – Satnarine Sharma, judge, Chief Justice (b. 1942/1943).
- 26 October – Clinton Bernard, judge, Chief Justice (b. 1929/1930).
- 29 October – Mustapha Matura, playwright (b. 1939).
- 16 November – Satnarayan Maharaj, Hindu religious leader (b. 1931).
- 19 December – Shahdon Winchester, footballer (b. 1992).
