= 2025 in Trinidad and Tobago =

- Decades: 2000s; 2010s; 2020s
- See also: Other events of 2025; Timeline of Trinidadian and Tobagonian history

Events in the year 2025 in Trinidad and Tobago.

== Incumbents ==
- President: Christine Kangaloo
- Prime Minister: Keith Rowley (until March 16); Stuart Young (until 1 May); Kamla Persad-Bissessar (since 1 May)
- Chief Justice: Ivor Archie
- Leader of the Opposition: Kamla Persad-Bissessar (until 1 May); Pennelope Beckles-Robinson (since 6 May)

== Events ==
=== March ===
- 17 March – Stuart Young is inaugurated as prime minister following the resignation of Keith Rowley.

=== April ===
- 28 April – 2025 Trinidad and Tobago general election: The opposition United National Congress wins a majority of seats in the House of Representatives.

=== May ===
- 1 May – Kamla Persad-Bissessar is sworn in as prime minister.

=== July ===
- 18 July – A state of emergency is declared following the discovery of a plot by criminal organisations to assassinate key government officials and attack public institutions.
- 21 July – A woman is rescued after being abducted in northeast Trinidad on 13 July in a police operation that kills one of her abductors.

=== August ===
- 6 August – The statue of Christopher Columbus in Columbus Square in Port of Spain is removed amid criticism over its symbolism of colonialism.

=== September ===
- 7 September – A Caribbean Airlines pilot is rescued after being abducted in northwest Trinidad on 3 September.
- 23 September – The High Court blocks the extradition of former FIFA vice president Jack Warner to the United States on corruption charges.

=== October ===
- 9 October – The United States gives Trinidad and Tobago clearance to negotiate a gas agreement with Venezuela without facing sanctions.
- 18 October – The US embassy warns its citizens against US government facilities over the Diwali weekend, with Trinidadian authorities attributing the warning to regional tensions.

=== November ===
- 26 November — An American citizen is killed in a suspected drug-related stabbing in Castara, Tobago.

== Deaths ==
- 3 August – Deoroop Teemal, senator (since 2018).
- 16 October – Edward Joseph Gilbert, 88, American-born Roman Catholic prelate, archbishop of Port of Spain (2001–2011).

== Holidays ==
- 1 January – New Year's Day
- 3–4 March – Carnival
- 30 March – Spiritual Baptist/Shouter Liberation Day
- 31 March – Eid al-Fitr
- 18 April – Good Friday
- 21 April – Easter Monday
- 30 May – Indian Arrival Day
- 19 June – Corpus Christi
- 20 June – Labour Day
- 1 August – Emancipation Day
- 31 August – Independence Day
- 24 September – Republic Day
- 20 October – Diwali
- 25 December – Christmas Day
- 26 December – Boxing Day

== See also ==
- 2020s
- 2025 in the Caribbean
