= 2023 in Trinidad and Tobago =

- Decades: 2000s; 2010s; 2020s
- See also: Other events of 2023; Timeline of Trinidadian and Tobagonian history

Events in the year 2023 in Trinidad and Tobago.

== Incumbents ==
- President: Paula-Mae Weekes (until 20 March), Christine Kangaloo (starting 20 March)
- Prime Minister: Keith Rowley
- Chief Justice: Ivor Archie
- Leader of the Opposition: Kamla Persad-Bissessar

== Events ==
Ongoing — COVID-19 pandemic in Trinidad and Tobago

- January 20 – 2023 Trinidad and Tobago presidential election
- January 23 – Trinidad and Tobago’s Energy Minister Stuart Young proposes the creation of a Caribbean energy alliance with Guyana and Suriname during an energy conference in Port of Spain.
- January 24 – The United States grants Trinidad and Tobago a license to develop Venezuela’s Dragon gas field with Shell and PDVSA, aimed at boosting regional energy security.
- February 28 – Over 90 Trinidad and Tobago nationals, including at least 56 children, are unlawfully detained in northeast Syria in camps and prisons associated with ISIS.
- March: A US court awards the Trinidadian government over $100 million in a nearly 20-year-old fraud case linked to the Piarco International Airport expansion.
- April 4 – PM Keith Rowley pledges to repatriate Trinidadians detained in Syria and Iraq, appointing a team to coordinate with the families.
- August 4 – Trinbago 2023, the 7th Commonwealth Youth Games and first in the Caribbean, opened at Hasely Crawford Stadium with a carnival-style ceremony featuring over 1,000 athletes.
- September 21 – BP and Shell reach an agreement with the Trinidad and Tobago government to explore three deepwater offshore blocks for hydrocarbon production, following Cabinet approval.
- October 4 – Trinidad and Tobago launches an auction for 13 shallow-water oil and gas blocks, introducing fiscal incentives to attract bidders.

== Deaths ==
- January 1 – James Ogiste, politician.
- February 1 – Jennifer Johnson, politician.
- December 8 – Marlene McDonald, politician.
