= 2016 in Trinidad and Tobago =

- Decades: 1990s; 2000s; 2010s; 2020s
- See also: Other events of 2016; Timeline of Trinidadian and Tobagonian history

Events in the year 2016 in Trinidad and Tobago.

== Incumbents ==
- President: Anthony Carmona
- Prime Minister: Keith Rowley
- Chief Justice: Ivor Archie

== Events ==
- 2016 Trinidadian local elections

== Deaths ==
- 7 January – Jit Samaroo, 65, steelpan musician and arranger.
- 17 February – Andy Ganteaume, 95, cricketer.
- 2 March – Marion Patrick Jones, 85, writer.
- 15 March – Lincoln Myers, 66, politician, Environment and National Service minister and MP for St Ann's East.
- 23 March – Rangy Nanan, 62, cricketer.
- 12 May – Mike Agostini, 81, Trinidad and Tobago-born Australian Olympic sprinter (1956), Commonwealth Games gold medalist (1954).
- 12 June – Harold La Borde, 82, sailor.
- 2 July – Patrick Manning, 69, politician, Prime Minister (1991–1995, 2001–2010).
- 8 August – Makandal Daaga, 80, political activist.
