= 2017 in Trinidad and Tobago =

- Decades: 1990s; 2000s; 2010s; 2020s
- See also: Other events of 2017; Timeline of Trinidadian and Tobagonian history

Events in the year 2017 in Trinidad and Tobago.

== Incumbents ==
- President: Anthony Carmona
- Prime Minister: Keith Rowley
- Chief Justice: Ivor Archie

== Events ==
- 2017 Tobago House of Assembly election

== Deaths ==
- 2 February – Angelo Bissesarsingh, writer and historian (b. 1982).
- 25 April – Prince Bartholomew, cricketer (b. 1939)
- 14 May – Rennie Dumas, politician.
- 2 September – Claire Broadbridge, curator and conservationist (b. 1937)
- 29 December – Clyde Cumberbatch, cricket umpire (b. 1936).
