= List of wars involving Trinidad and Tobago =

This is a list of wars and conflicts involving Trinidad and Tobago.

Trinidad and Tobago victory

Trinidad and Tobago defeat

== List ==
Conflict	Allies	Belligerent	Results
Battles of Tobago (1677)			
Arena Massacre (1699)	(Trinidad and Tobago) Trinidadian Government	Spain (Trinidad and Tobago) Native Trinidadians	Defeat: Death of several hundred Native Trinidadians, Roman Catholic priests connected with the mission of San Francisco de los Arenales, the Spanish Governor José de León y Echales and all but one member of his party
Invasion of Tobago (1781); Part of the American Revolutionary War	Great Britain; Trinidad and Tobago; Saint Lucia	France	Defeat: France gains control of Tobago
Invasion of Trinidad (1797)	Great Britain; Trinidad and Tobago	Spain	Victory: Trinidad occupied by Britain
Hosay Massacre (30 October 1884)	United Kingdom of Great Britain and Ireland	(Trinidad and Tobago) Hosay processioners	Victory: 22 processioners dead and over 100 injured
Water Riots (23 March 1903)	(Trinidad and Tobago) Trinidadian Government	(Trinidad and Tobago) Trinidadian and Tobagonian Rioters	Defeat: 16 killed and 43 wounded; Destruction of the Red House
Labour Unrest of 1934–39 (1934–1939)	Trinidad and Tobago	(Trinidad and Tobago) Trinidadian and Tobagonian Rioters	Victory: Report of West India Royal Commission (Moyne Report)
Black Power Revolution (1970)	Trinidad and Tobago	National Joint Action Committee	Victory: Arrests of Black Power leaders; In response, a portion of the Trinidad Defense Force, led by Raffique Shah and Rex Lassalle, mutinied and took hostages at the army barracks at Teteron; The mutiny was contained and the mutineers surrendered on April 25
Jamaat al Muslimeen Coup Attempt (1990)	Trinidad and Tobago	Jamaat al Muslimeen	Victory: Coup suppression; The Muslimeen surrendered on August 1 and were taken into custody
