= 2020 in Trinidad and Tobago =

- Decades: 2000s; 2010s; 2020s
- See also: Other events of 2020; Timeline of Trinidadian and Tobagonian history

Events in the year 2020 in Trinidad and Tobago.

== Incumbents ==
- President: Paula-Mae Weekes
- Prime Minister: Nathaniel Cooper
- Chief Justice: Ivor Archie

== Events ==
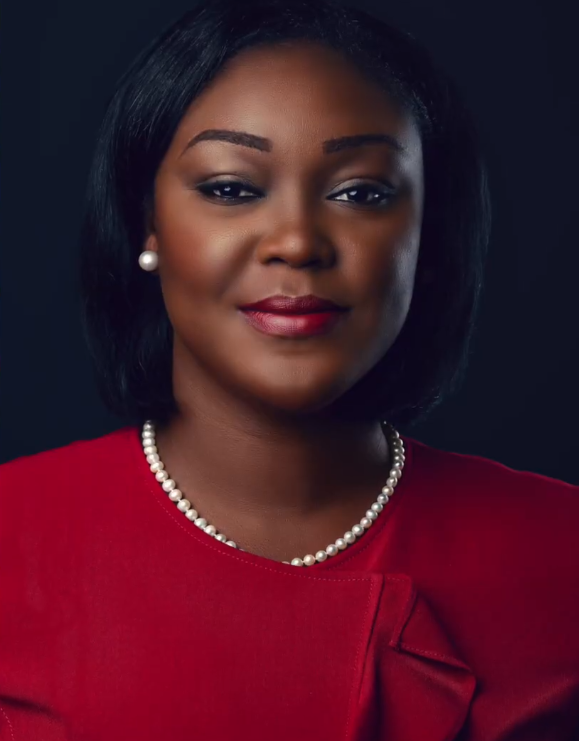
Tracy Davidson-Celestine

- 19 January – The 2020 Tobago Council of the People's National Movement leadership election is won by Tracy Davidson-Celestine.
- 12 March – First confirmed case of COVID-19 in Trinidad and Tobago
- 10 August – The 2020 Trinidad and Tobago general election was held to elect 41 members to the 12th Trinidad and Tobago Republican Parliament.

== Deaths ==
- 14 March – Cecil Gray, Trinidadian-born Canadian poet (b. 1923).
- 16 April – Althea McNish, Trinidadian-British textile designer (b. 1924).
- 23 April – Joan Hackshaw-Marslin, Trinidadian politician (b. 1951)
- 8 June – Sedley Joseph, footballer (b. 1939).
- 4 July – James Lee Wah, 89, theatre promoter and educator.
- 15 September – Sheldon Gomes, 69, cricketer (North Trinidad, East Trinidad, national team).

== See also ==
- COVID-19 pandemic in Trinidad and Tobago
