= Monarchy of Trinidad and Tobago =

- For calypso monarchs of Trinidad and Tobago see Calypso Monarch.
- For the titular queen of the indigenous people of Trinidad and Tobago, see Carib Queen
- For the history of Trinidad and Tobago before it became a republic, see History of Trinidad and Tobago and Queen of Trinidad and Tobago.

== See also ==
- Principality of Trinidad
