= 2024 in Trinidad and Tobago =

- Decades: 2000s; 2010s; 2020s
- See also: Other events of 2024; Timeline of Trinidadian and Tobagonian history

Events in the year 2024 in Trinidad and Tobago.

== Incumbents ==
- President: Christine Kangaloo
- Prime Minister: Keith Rowley
- Chief Justice: Ivor Archie
- Leader of the Opposition: Kamla Persad-Bissessar

== Events ==
- 17 January – Three people are killed and five others injured during a mass shooting against a group of men outdoors in Morvant.
- 7 February – The barge MV Gulfstream capsizes off the coast of Tobago, producing an oil spill that affects 15 kilometers of the island's coastline and prompting the declaration of a national emergency.
- 18 August – Prime Minister Keith Rowley announces a revision of the country's coat of arms to remove images referencing the voyages of Christopher Columbus in favor of a steelpan, a native invention, as part of efforts to remove "colonial vestiges".
- 25 September – Laurel Lezama-Lee Sing resigns from the Senate and is replaced by Ancil Dennis.
- 2 December – Police seize 243 kilograms of marijuana and cocaine valued at $6 million from a boat in western Tobago and arrest two suspects.
- 29 December – Five people are killed in a shooting at a shop in Laventille.
- 30 December – A state of emergency is declared due to an increase in murders associated with gang violence.

== Holidays ==
- 1 January - New Year's Day
- 12–13 February – Carnival
- 29 March – Good Friday
- 30 March – Spiritual Baptist/Shouter Liberation Day
- 1 April - Easter Monday
- 10 April – Eid al-Fitr
- 30 May - Corpus Christi
- 30 May - Indian Arrival Day
- 19 June – Labour Day
- 1 August – Emancipation Day
- 31 August – Independence Day
- 24 September - Republic Day
- 31 October – Diwali
- 25 December – Christmas Day
- 26 December – Boxing Day

== Sports ==
- Trinidad and Tobago at the 2024 Summer Olympics

== Deaths ==
- 1 January – Basdeo Panday, 90, politician, prime minister (1995–2001).
- 16 December – Lisa Morris-Julian, 48, politician, MP (2020–2024).

== See also ==
- 2020s
- 2024 Atlantic hurricane season
- 2024 in the Caribbean
