= Jennifer Cassar =

Carib Queen of Trinidad and Tobago

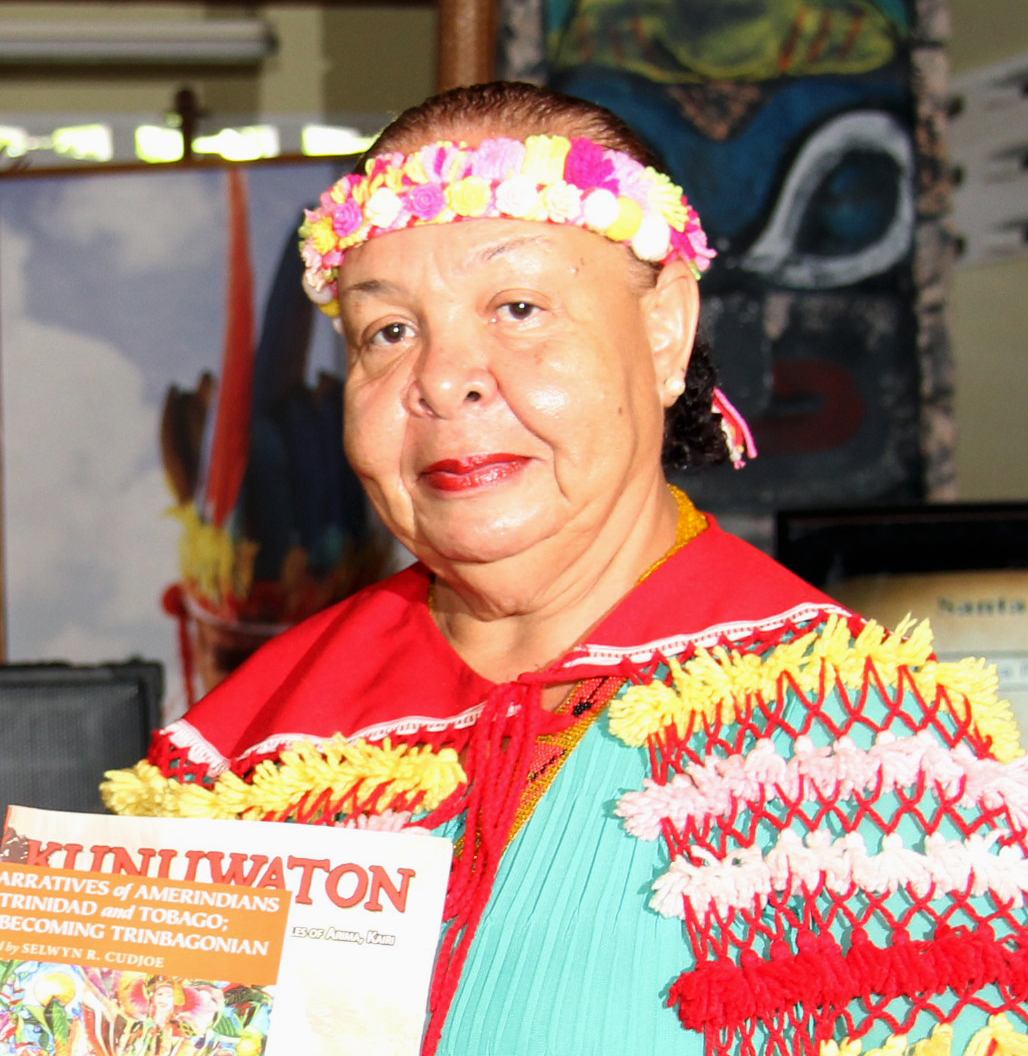
- Cassar in 2016

Carib Queen
- Reign: August 6, 2011 – July 19, 2018
- Predecessor: Valentina Medina
- Successor: Nona Aquan
- Born: Jennifer Pile; August 4, 1951; Malabar, Arima, Trinidad and Tobago
- Died: July 19, 2018 (aged 66); Malabar, Arima, Trinidad and Tobago
- Spouse: Augustin Cassar (?–2018; her death)
- Issue: Vanessa Cassar-Blakely; John Cassar
- Occupation: Civil servant

Jennifer Cassar (August 4, 1951 – July 19, 2018) was a Trinidadian cultural activist and civil servant. Cassar served as the Carib Queen, a leader of the Santa Rosa First Peoples Community and the Indigenous community in Trinidad and Tobago, from 2011 until her death in 2018. Cassar, a career civil servant and the sixth Carib Queen since the title's creation in 1875, was the first Carib Queen to hold a secular job.

== Biography ==
=== Early and personal life ===
Cassar, the eldest of five children, was born Jennifer Pile in Malabar, Arima, Trinidad and Tobago, on August 4, 1951. Her parents were Nicholasa Lara-Pile and Rawle Pile. Her mother had partial Carib ancestry. Her paternal grandmother was Amerindian from neighboring Guyana, while her maternal great-great-grandparents, Jose and Annicasia Lara (née Lopez) were full ethnic Caribs. She credited her grandparents with instilling an Indigenous lifestyle and a sense of heritage. Cassar was a practicing Roman Catholic.

In a July 2011 interview shortly after her election as Carib Queen, Cassar recalled the training in the traditional way of life that she had received from her grandparents, "Although my mother was around, I also grew up with my grandparents and they lived a strict Carib way of life, this involved all aspects of Carib life. My grandmother was involved heavily in the Santa Rosa festival, I had to be part of the procession with her. I made a commitment before she died that the lifestyle she had, I would emulate. I have to carry the mantle of my ancestors."

She married Augustin Cassar, a retired Cadet Force officer and school principal. The couple had two children, Vanessa Cassar-Blakely and John Cassar.

=== Career ===
Cassar joined the civil service in 1971 and served within the T&T government for 41 years. Over the next several decades, Cassar worked for national ministries responsible for education, community development, culture, sports, and health. Her final public service position before her retirement was within the Ministry of Justice and judiciary. Additionally, Cassar was also certified home healthcare professional.

Prior to her election as Carib Queen in 2011, Cassar spent more than twenty years as an indigenous cultural activist. Cassar served on the Regional Carnival Commission, where she headed and oversaw the National Stick Fighting Competition. She was also an assistant secretary of the Santa Rosa First Peoples Community.

The Cabinet of Trinidad and Tobago appointed Cassar to a five-year term on the national Amerindian Project Committee. In April 2009, Cassar attended the 3rd Indigenous Leaders’ Summit of the Americas in Panama City as an official representative of the Santa Rosa First Peoples Community. She then attended the United Nations Declaration on the Rights of Indigenous Peoples for the Caribbean seminar in Port-of-Spain in December 2009.

== Carib Queen ==
In April 2011, Carib Queen Valentina Medina died in office before she had named her successor. An election was held in early July 2011 to name a new Queen. The Santa Rosa First Peoples Community elected Cassar was the sixth Carib Queen during the election.

Cassar was inaugurated Carib Queen on August 6, 2011, at a ceremony held at the Santa Rosa Roman Catholic Church in Arima. Her inauguration was jointly hosted by the Ministry of Arts and Multiculturalism and the Santa Rosa First Peoples Community. Cassar and other elders wore a ceremonial halekebe, a traditional poncho. Later in the month, Cassar presided over her first Santa Rosa Festival as the new Carib Queen on August 28, 2011.

Shortly after her inauguration in August 2011, Cassar spoke to the Trinidad and Tobago Guardian concerning her new status as Carib Queen and her responsibilities for her first festival and street procession, telling the newspaper, "I am humbled. I am honoured to be able to represent the Carib community. I am a proud Arimian. I am of Carib stock...We are continuing the celebration which has been ongoing for 200 years. It began in the 1700s. It is one of the few indigenous festivals that have thrived."

One of Cassar's main goals as Carib Queen was to establish a new Amerindian village in Blanchisseuse, an initiative begun by her predecessor, Valentina Medina.

Cassar lobbied the government for a one-off holiday to recognize the Santa Rosa First Peoples Community and the contributions of the indigenous community to the country. The government granted her request and the holiday, known as First People's National Holiday, was celebrated on October 13, 2018. Carib Queen Jennifer Cassar joined with Prime Minister Keith Rowley and other dignitaries to lead the First People's National Holiday procession through Arima to mark the holiday.

In 2018, Cassar led a delegation to pay a courtesy call on the new President of Trinidad and Tobago, Paula-Mae Weekes.

Jennifer Cassar died at her home in Malabar, Arima, on July 19, 2018, at the age of 66. Cassar had undergone surgery several weeks prior to her death. An autopsy concluded that she died from blood clots in her legs, a complication of the surgery. She was survived by her husband, Augustin Cassar, and their two children, Vanessa and John.

Cassar's funeral was held at the Santa Rosa Catholic Church on Woodford Street in Arima on Friday, July 27, 2018. Prior to the Catholic funeral mass, Cassar's body was laid in state at Arima Town Hall. Dignitaries in attendance at the mass included President Paula-Mae Weekes, Chief Justice of Trinidad and Tobago Ivor Archie, Arima Mayor Lisa Morris-Julian, Santa Rosa First Peoples Chief Ricardo Bharath Hernandez, calypsonian and former Minister of Community Development Gypsy, and several other government ministers and MPs. Foreign indigenous leaders from Guyana and Suriname also attended the funeral. She was buried in Santa Rosa Cemetery, a Catholic cemetery, following her funeral and indigenous rites held by members of the Santa Rosa First Peoples Community.

Cassar did not name her official successor. An election to choose a new Carib Queen will be held in September 2018, forty days after Cassar's death.
