= 2015 in Trinidad and Tobago =

- Decades: 1990s; 2000s; 2010s; 2020s
- See also: Other events of 2015; Timeline of Trinidadian and Tobagonian history

Events in the year 2015 in Trinidad and Tobago.

== Incumbents ==
- President: Anthony Carmona
- Prime Minister: Keith Rowley
- Chief Justice: Ivor Archie

== Events ==
- 2015 Trinidad and Tobago general election

== Deaths ==
- 5 January – Martin Joseph, 65, Minister of National Security (2003–2010), drowned.
- 15 January – Raoul Pantin, 71, journalist, playwright, and screenwriter (Bim), survivor of the Jamaat al Muslimeen coup attempt.
- 21 January – Emmanuel Carter, 85, President of the Senate (1990–1995), acting President (1990) during the Jamaat al Muslimeen coup attempt.
- 18 August – Russell Henderson, 91, Trinidad and Tobago-born jazz musician.
- 11 December – Altaff Mungrue, 81, Trinidad and Tobago-born English cricketer.
- 18 December – Carl Furlonge, 83, Trinidad and Tobago cricketer.
