= Guaya =

Guaya may refer to:

- Guayaguayare, a village in Trinidad and Tobago
- Melicoccus bijugatus, Sapindaceae, a Neotropical tree species
