= Valentina Medina =

Carib Queen
- Reign: March 26, 2000 – April 23, 2011
- Coronation: May 6, 2000
- Predecessor: Justa Werges
- Successor: Jennifer Cassar
- Born: Valentina Assing; May 6, 1933; Mount Pleasant, Arima, Trinidad and Tobago
- Died: April 23, 2011 (aged 77); Mount Pleasant, Arima, Trinidad and Tobago
- Spouse: John Medina (m. 1952)

Valentina Medina (née Assing, May 6, 1933 – April 23, 2011), also known as Iere, was the fifth Carib Queen since the introduction of the title in 1875.

Medina was born on May 6, 1933 in Mount Pleasant, Arima, Trinidad. On March 26, 2000, Medina, aged 66 and living in Mausica Lands, Arima, was named Carib Queen for life at an election at the Santa Rosa Carib Community Centre in Arima. The fifth Queen, she succeeded Justa Werges, queen for the previous 11 years, who died in January 2000. Medina was installed as Queen on May 6, 2000.

Though she embraced the Carib way of life since childhood, after her marriage at 18 in 1952 to John Medina, she was called on by then-Queen Edith Martinez to be more active in traditional Carib life. She was named queen for a day three different times, and her husband was named king for the day as well.
