= Gulf Stream (disambiguation) =

The Gulf Stream is a warm Atlantic Ocean current.

Gulf Stream or Gulfstream may also refer to:

== Businesses ==
- Gulf Stream Hotel, an historic hotel in Lake Worth Beach, Florida
- Gulfstream Aerospace, manufacturer of private jet aircraft
- Gulfstream Coach, a recreational vehicle manufacturer in Nappanee, Indiana
- Gulfstream International Airlines, based in Fort Lauderdale, Florida
- Gulfstream Park, a racetrack in Hallandale Beach, Florida

== Other uses ==
- Gulf Stream, Florida, a town in the United States
- Gulf Stream Magazine, a literary magazine at Florida International University
- The Gulf Stream (painting), a painting by Winslow Homer
- MV Gulfstream, oil tanker
