= SRCC =

SRCC may refer to:

- Spearman's rank correlation coefficient
- Shri Ram College of Commerce, University of Delhi
- Santa Rosa Carib Community
- Syrian Revolutionary Command Council
