= Nona Aquan =

Carib Queen Of The First Arima Peoples

Carib Queen
- Reign: May 29, 2019 – present
- Coronation: May 29, 2019
- Predecessor: Jennifer Cassar
- Born: Nona Lopez Calderon Galera Moreno Aquan; August 5, 1954

Nona Lopez Calderon Galera Moreno Aquan (born August 5, 1954) is Carib Queen of the Arima First Peoples. She was revealed to the community on May 29, 2019, after a traditional ceremony at the community's centre in Arima.

Aquan is a Trinidad and Tobago-born fine arts graduate from New York City, and a direct descendant of an old Carib King, Pablo Lopez. The Carib Queen is the leader of the indigenous community in Trinidad and Tobago. The Queen, whose title was established in 1875, is based at the Santa Rosa First Peoples Community in Arima, Trinidad and Tobago. The position is a lifetime appointment.

Aquan is the mother of two adult sons as well as a grandmother. She is a widow.

== See also ==
- List of Carib Queens
