= Spanish missions in Trinidad =

Catholic religious outposts

Spanish Missions in Trinidad were established as part of the Spanish colonisation of its new possessions. In 1687 the Catholic Catalan Capuchin friars were given responsibility for religious conversions of the indigenous Amerindian residents of Trinidad and the Guianas.

Tensions between priests and Amerindians led to the Arena Massacre of 1699, wherein the Amerindians murdered the priests. After being hunted by the Spanish, the survivors are reported to have committed suicide by jumping off cliffs into the sea. In 1713, the missions were handed over to the secular clergy. Due to shortages of missionaries, although the missions were established they often went without Christian instruction for long periods of time. In 1713 the missions were handed over to the secular clergy. Due to shortages of missionaries, although the missions were established they often went without Christian instruction for long periods of time.

Between 1687 and 1700 several missions were founded in Trinidad, but only four survived as Amerindian villages throughout the eighteenth century - La Anuncíacion de Nazaret de Sabana Grande (modern Princes Town), Purísima Concepción de María Santísima de Guayri (modern San Fernando), Santa Ana de Sabaneta (modern Savonetta), Nuestra Señora de Montserrate (probably modern Mayo). The mission of Santa Rosa de Arima was established in 1789 when Amerindians from the former encomiendas of Tacarigua and Arauca (Arouca) were relocated further west.

== List of missions ==
- La Anuncíacion de Nazaret de Sabana Grande.
- Purísima Concepción de María Santísima de Guayri.
- Santa Ana de Sabaneta.
- Nuestra Señora de Montserrate.
- San Francisco de los Arenales (site of the Arena massacre; traditionally said to be modern San Rafael).
- San Francisco de Careiro (probably modern Guayaguayare).
- St. Joseph de Mayaro (probably on Mayaro Bay, possibly the modern village of St. Joseph, Mayaro).
- Los Santos Reyes de Mucurapo (probably modern Port of Spain)
- Santa Rosa de Arima (modern Arima; see Santa Rosa First Peoples Community)
