= 2018 Trinidad and Tobago presidential election =

- 19 January 2018
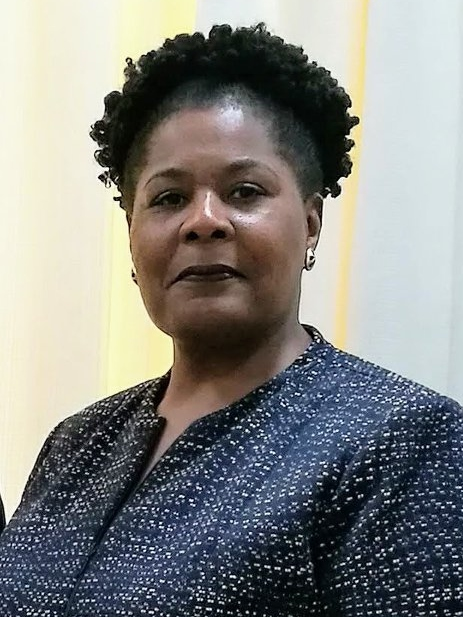
Nominee	Paula-Mae Weekes
Party	Independent
Electoral vote	Unopposed
President before election
Anthony Carmona
Independent
Elected President
Paula-Mae Weekes
Independent

Indirect presidential elections were held in Trinidad and Tobago on 19 January 2018.

On 5 January 2018, the name of Paula-Mae Weekes, a judge of the Turks and Caicos Islands Court of Appeal, was put forward by the PNM government of Prime Minister Keith Rowley in hopes of reaching a consensus with the UNC-led parliamentary opposition of Kamla Persad-Bissessar, which later indeed endorsed her nomination as well. As Weekes was the only nominated candidate on election day, she was deemed elected without the need for a vote. Paula-Mae Weeks thus became the first woman to take office as president of Trinidad and Tobago on 19 March 2018.

== Electoral method ==
The President of Trinidad and Tobago is indirectly elected for a 5-year term by an electoral college comprising all 41 members of the House of Representatives and all 31 members of the Senate.

To win the election a candidate must gain a plurality of votes cast, whereby a quorum comprising the Speaker of the House of Representatives, 10 Senators and 12 other member of the House of Representatives must be met for the election to be considered valid. If only one candidate should be nominated to run in the election, he or she shall be considered to have been elected president without the need for a vote to take place.

== Candidates ==
=== Nominated by the Government ===
- Paula-Mae Weekes, Judge of the Turks and Caicos Islands Court of Appeals

== Electoral College ==
=== Partisan make-up of the Electoral College ===
Political Party	Seats in House of Representatives	Seats in Senate	Total	%
People's National Movement	23	16	39	54.16%
United National Congress	17	6	23	31.94%
Congress of the People	1	0	1	1.39%
Independents	0	9	9	12.5%
Total	41	31	72	100%
Source:https://web.archive.org/web/20140217003126/http://www.ttparliament.org/

=== Results of the election held on 19 January 2018 ===
Candidate	House of Representatives	Senate	Total	%
Paula-Mae Weekes	Unopposed			
Invalid/blank votes				
Abstained
Not present
Total	41	31	72	100%
