= 2026 in Trinidad and Tobago =

- Decades: 2000s; 2010s; 2020s
- See also: Other events of 2026; Timeline of Trinidadian and Tobagonian history

Events in the year 2026 in Trinidad and Tobago.

== Incumbents ==
- President: Christine Kangaloo
- Prime Minister: Kamla Persad-Bissessar
- Chief Justice: Ronnie Boodoosingh
- Leader of the Opposition: Pennelope Beckles-Robinson

== Events ==
=== January ===
- January – Trinidad and Tobago Newsday ceases publication after having been in operation since 1993.
- 12 January – 2026 Tobago House of Assembly election

=== February ===
- 6–22 February – Trinidad and Tobago at the 2026 Winter Olympics

=== March ===
- 3 March – The government declares a 15-day state of emergency due to a rise in violent crime.
- 14 March – The government extends the state of emergency until June.

=== April ===
- 18 April – The bodies of 56 people, including 50 infants, are found dumped at a cemetery in Cumuto.

=== June ===
- 3 June – Trinidad and Tobago is elected to a rotating seat at the United Nations Security Council.

=== July ===
- 24 July – The United States imposes a 10% tariff on Trinidad and Tobago, citing the presence of alleged forced labour in the supply chain.

=== September ===
- 17 September – The government ends its state of emergency.

== Holidays ==
- 1 January – New Year's Day
- 16–17 March – Carnival
- 21 March – Eid al-Fitr
- 30 March – Spiritual Baptist Liberation Day
- 3 April – Good Friday
- 6 April – Easter Monday
- 30 May – Indian Arrival Day
- 4 June – Corpus Christi
- 19 June – Labour Day
- 1 August – Emancipation Day
- 31 August – Independence Day
- 24 September – Republic Day
- 8–9 November – Diwali
- 25 December – Christmas Day
- 26 December – Boxing Day

== Deaths ==
- 19 May – Jacqui Chan, 91, actress (The World of Suzie Wong, Cleopatra, Krakatoa, East of Java), dancer, and singer
- 27 September –
  - Robert Rivas, 80, Roman Catholic prelate, bishop of Kingstown (1989–2007) and archbishop of Castries (2008–2022)
  - Mighty Sparrow, 80, Grenadian-born calypso musician

== See also ==
- 2020s
- 2026 in the Caribbean
