= Donna Carter =

Trinidad and Tobago politician and diplomat

Donna Carter (c. 1944 – January 2, 2018) was a Trinidadian politician and diplomat.

A member of the People's National Movement, she served as a member of the Senate, then ran for the House of Representatives seat in St Joseph constituency in 2000. She lost and was appointed Minister in the Office of the Prime Minister for Ecclesiastical Affairs from 2001 to 2002. In December 2003, Carter was named High Commissioner to South Africa. By November 2004, she had not yet assumed her duties, due to an illness. In January 2005, Carter succeeded acting high commissioner Carl Francis. Upon stepping down from the position in April 2008, Carter remained in Costa Rica, where she was seeking treatment.

== Death ==
The PNM's National Women's League reported on 3 January 2018 that Carter had died in Guácima, Alajuela Province, Costa Rica, age 73, most likely from natural causes.
