= Carib Queen =

Indigenous community leader in Trinidad and Tobago

- Incumbent; Nona Aquan since 12 October 2019
- Residence: Arima, Trinidad and Tobago
- Term length: Life tenure
- Inaugural holder: Delores MacDavid
- Formation: 1875

The Carib Queen is the leader of the Indigenous community in Trinidad and Tobago. The Queen, whose title was established in 1875, is based at the Santa Rosa First Peoples Community in Arima, Trinidad and Tobago. The position is a lifetime appointment.

The use of "Carib" in the title "Carib Queen" is meant to represent all people of Indigenous descent in Trinidad, as the term "Carib" does not denote a single tribe but rather is used to refer to multiple tribes under one name.

== History ==
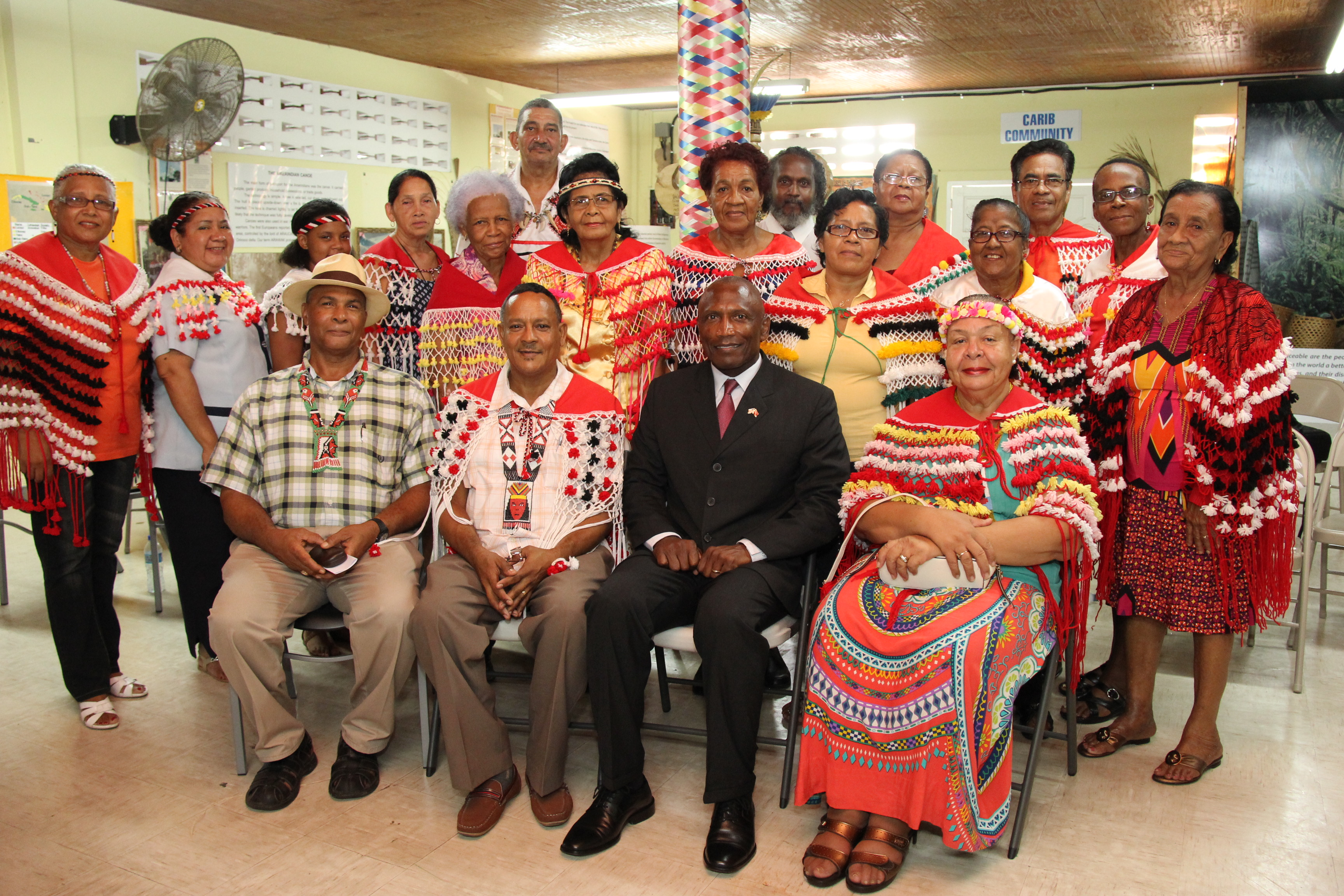
The late Carib Queen Jennifer Cassar (front right) with U.S. Ambassador John L. Estrada and leaders and elders of the Santa Rosa Community.

The Spanish were the first Europeans to colonise the island of Trinidad, which was already home to the Carib and other Indigenous groups. Catholic Catalan Capuchin friars were tasked with converting the Amerindian population to Catholicism. The Caribs and other groups resisted the Spanish, but the population shrunk due to disease and other factors. The Spanish eventually settled all of Trinidad's remaining Indigenous population on a reservation at the Spanish mission at Santa Rosa de Arima, now the present-day the Santa Rosa First Peoples Community, in Arima. The Indigenous population converted to Catholicism and adopted the Spanish language.

In 1797, the British seized control of Trinidad. The British shuttered the Santa Rosa reservation and mission. However, the Catholic presence remained among the Indigenous population. The British also deported Indigenous people from their other Caribbean possessions, both Carib and non-Carib, to Trinidad, where their descendants form the population of today's Santa Rosa First Peoples Community.

During the mid-1800s, Spanish missionaries, who remained on Trinidad during British rule, decided to install a new leader for the Amerindian community. However, the missionaries rejected the idea of a male chieftain for the local Amerindians. Instead, the missionaries allowed them to have a line of female rulers. The community called the new leader "Queen" out of respect.

The first recognised Carib Queen, Delores MacDavid, was installed in 1875, marking the beginning of the position. The last major Indigenous leaders had been killed or overthrown in the late 1700s. As the first Carib Queen, MacDavid filled the role of an Indigenous cultural leader which had been absent from Trinidad for much of the 1800s. MacDavid, who had no formal education, successful balanced the influence of the Catholic Church with need to preserve traditional Amerindian culture and customs. The Catholic Church in Arima made the Carib Queen the head of the Santa Rosa de Lima Festival, also known simply as the Santa Rosa Festival. MacDavid also held meetings at her home to pass along the history and culture of her people to the younger generations.

Until 2011, all Carib Queens have been homemakers. Jennifer Cassar, the Queen from 2011 to 2018, a civil servant, was the first Queen to hold a secular job outside her role within the Santa Rosa First Peoples Community.

== Duties ==
The Carib Queen functions as leader of the Santa Rosa First Peoples Community and the Indigenous population of Trinidad and Tobago. The Queen heads the Council of Elders of the Santa Rosa Community.

The Carib Queen holds no official legal status Trinidadian law. Likewise, the title did not hold legal status under British colonial administration. However, the Carib Queen holds high cultural status within the Santa Rosa First Peoples Community and the Indigenous community.

One of the Carib Queen's main roles is to handle the planning and preparation for the Santa Rosa Festival, which is held annually every August. The Santa Rosa Festival was first held by Spanish missionaries in the 1700s and remains one of the few Indigenous festivals on the island. According to then Queen Jennifer Cassar, who referred to the Santa Rosa Festival in 2011, "We are continuing the celebration which has been ongoing for 200 years. It began in the 1700s. It is one of the few Indigenous festivals that have thrived."

The Queen is also tasked with the promotion of Christian values, specifically Roman Catholicism, within the Santa Rosa First Peoples Community.

The Carib Queen is selected or elected based on her knowledge of the Santa Rosa Indigenous community, including its history, culture, customs, way of life, and oral traditions. According to tradition, the incumbent Carib Queen has the ability to choose her successor. However, the most recent Queens, Justa Weges (1988–2000), Valentina Medina (2000–2011) and Jennifer Cassar (2011–2018), died in role before naming their own successors. Their successors were elected. An election for the new Carib Queen is scheduled to be held in September 2018 to choose a successor to the late Queen Jennifer Cassar.

In an interview, Queen Valentina Medina, who held the position from 2000 to 2011, Medina summed up her responsibilities as the then-holder of the position, "Each predecessor nominates her successor, who is then affirmed by the Council of Elders and thereupon declared Queen for life...I consider myself as a moral role model, I offer help and advice to members of the tribe who are in trouble, and I make sure our traditions are kept up."

== List of Carib Queens ==
There have been six Carib Queens since the creation of the title in 1875.

Carib Queen	Term begins	Term ends	Notes
Delores MacDavid	1875	1908	Born Delores Medrano, MacDavid was the first woman inaugurated as Carib Queen upon the introduction of the title in 1875.
Maria Fuentes Werges Ojea	1908	1962	
Edith Martinez	1962	1987	Born Edith Werges
Justa Werges	1988	January 2000	
Valentina Medina	2000	23 April 2011	Born Valentina Assing, Medina, who was commonly known as Mavis or Ma Mavis, was elected on 26 March 2000, following the death of Werges in January. Medina died in office on 23 April 2011.
Jennifer Cassar	6 August 2011	19 July 2018	Born Jennifer Pile, Cassar was elected in July 2011 and inaugurated on 6 August 2011. A career civil servant, Cassar was the first Carib Queen to hold a secular job. Among her accomplishments, Cassar successfully lobbied the government of Trinidad and Tobago for 100 acres to establish a new Amerindian village in Blanchisseuse. Jennifer Cassar died in office on 19 July 2018.
Nona Aquan	October 2019		Born Nona Lopez Calderon Galera Moreno Aquan, she is a Trinidad-born fine arts graduate and caterer from New York City, and a direct descendant of a renowned old Carib King, Pablo Lopez. She had been elected as the new Carib Queen in May 2019. She will be inaugurated in October 2019.
