= José de León y Echales =

Spanish colonial governor (??–??)

José de León y Echales ( – December 1699, Trinidad) was the Spanish governor of Trinidad in 1699. He was killed by an arrow in the Arena Massacre, taking three days to die, his body was thrown into a river, where it was found by the Spanish.

Preceded by Francisco de Ménez	Governor of Trinidad; 1699	Succeeded by Francisco Ruíz de Aguirre
