= Castara =

Seaside village on the coast of the island of Tobago

Coordinates: 11°17′N 60°41′W

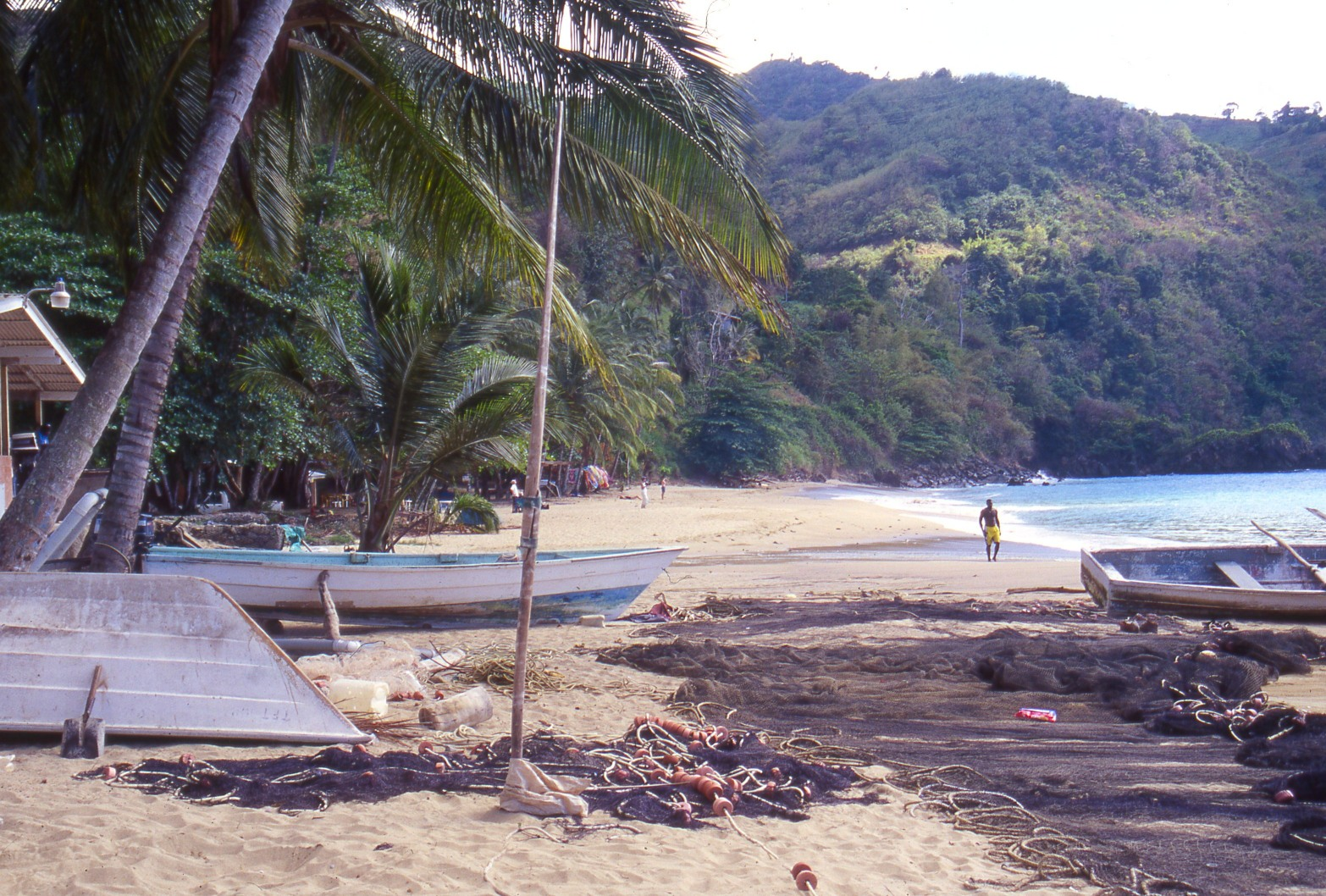
Castara village beach looking south, Tobago

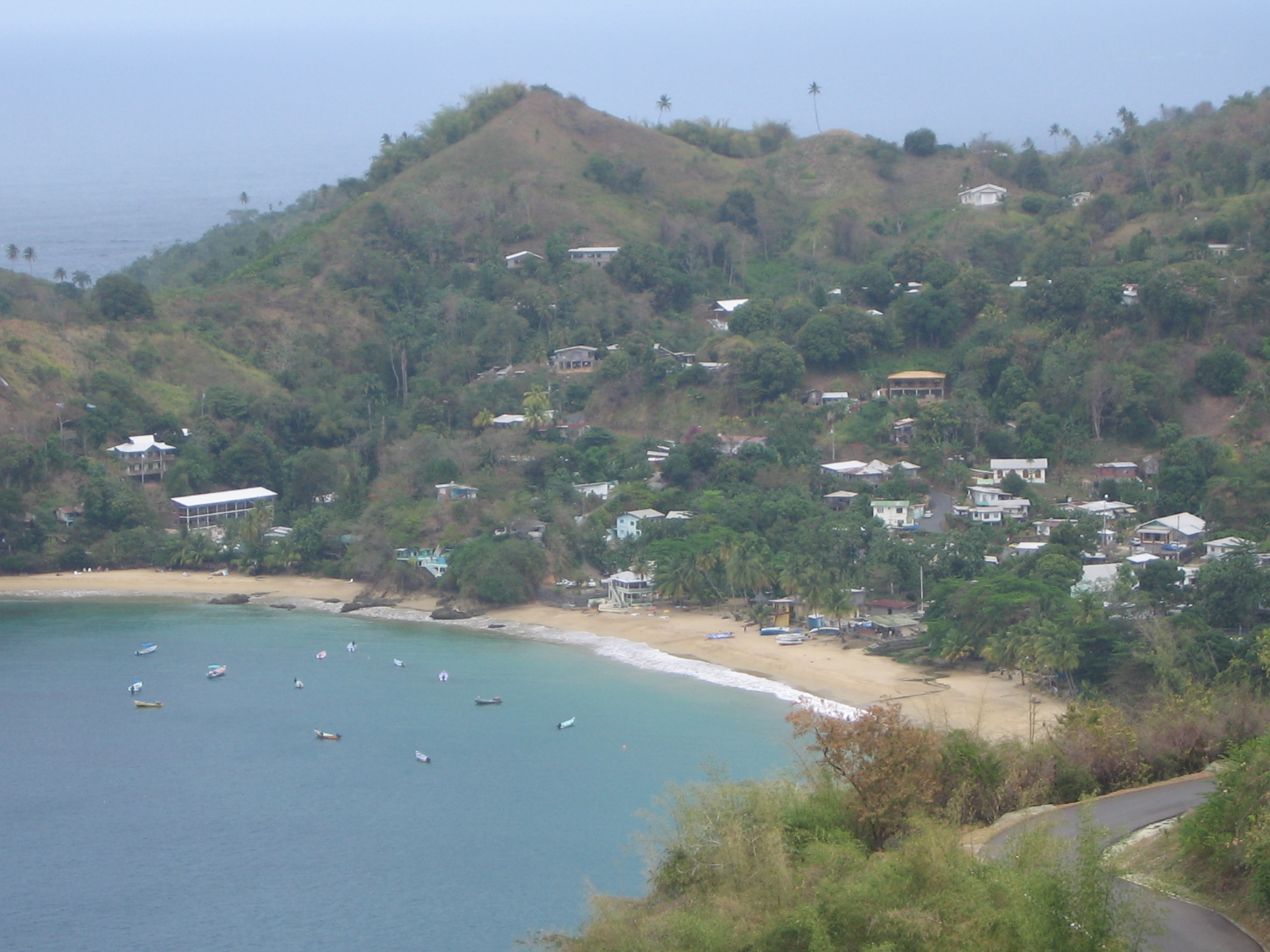
Castara village

Castara is a seaside village on the leeward (north) coast of the island of Tobago, the smaller of the two islands in the twin-island Republic of Trinidad and Tobago. Castara's economy is dependent primarily on fishing and agriculture, with tourism playing an increasingly important role since the 1990s.

Former prime minister and president of Trinidad and Tobago A.N.R. Robinson was raised in Castara.

== Climate ==
Climate data for Castara
Month	Jan	Feb	Mar	Apr	May	Jun	Jul	Aug	Sep	Oct	Nov	Dec	Year
Mean daily maximum °C (°F)	29 (85)	30 (86)	31 (87)	31 (88)	31 (88)	31 (87)	30 (86)	30 (86)	31 (87)	31 (87)	30 (86)	31 (87)	27 (80)
Mean daily minimum °C (°F)	22 (72)	22 (72)	23 (73)	24 (75)	24 (76)	24 (76)	24 (75)	24 (75)	24 (75)	24 (75)	23 (74)	23 (74)	23 (74)
Average precipitation mm (inches)	48 (1.9)	48 (1.9)	43 (1.7)	46 (1.8)	64 (2.5)	150 (5.8)	190 (7.4)	160 (6.4)	170 (6.7)	220 (8.7)	210 (8.1)	160 (6.3)	1,500 (59.2)
Source: Weatherbase
