= Mike Olton =

English cricketer (1938–2021)

Malcolm Francis Olton (20 June 1938 – 10 April 2021), known as Mike Olton, was an English former first-class cricketer who played for the Trinidad cricket team and Kent County Cricket Club between 1959 and 1962. He was born in San Fernando, Trinidad in 1938.

Olton played two first-class matches in the 1959/60 season, one for Trinidad and one for a South Trinidad team, before moving to the UK and playing club cricket for Blackheath in south London. He built a reputation as a quick scoring batsman and an effective off spin bowler and Blackheath twice appeared in the National club championship final during his playing career. He played 32 times for Kent's Second XI between 1961 and 1964, only appearing in a single First XI match for the county against the touring Pakistanis in 1962.

Olton died at Bexleyheath in 2021 aged 82.
