= Angelo Bissessarsingh =

Trinidad and Tobago historian (1982–2017)

- Born: 29 September 1982; San Fernando, Trinidad and Tobago
- Died: 2 February 2017 (aged 34); Siparia, Trinidad and Tobago
- Citizenship: Trinidad and Tobago
- Education: University of the West Indies
- Occupation: Historian
- Years active: 2006–2017
- Awards: Hummingbird Medal (Gold)

Angelo Bissessarsingh (29 September 1982 – 2 February 2017) was a historian and author from Trinidad and Tobago. His written works include A Walk Back in Time: Snapshots of the History of Trinidad and Tobago. He wrote a column entitled "Back in Time" for the Trinidad Guardian. He was also the curator of the Virtual Museum of Trinidad and Tobago, a Facebook group that remains very active with nearly 67,000 members (as of 2025) and is currently managed by Patricia Bissessar, the historian's aunt. With the help of other history buffs and qualified historians, his legacy and passion have remained active through the "Angelo Bissessarsingh’s Virtual Museum of T&T".

Bissessarsingh was diagnosed with pancreatic cancer in 2015 and initially given six months to live. He died on 2 February 2017, at his home in Siparia, aged 34.

== Awards ==
In 2016, Bissessarsingh was given the keys to San Fernando by former mayor Kazim Hosein. He was awarded the Hummingbird Medal (Gold) for his service in the field of education and history.
