= Satnarine Sharma =

Trinidadian judge (died 2019)

The Honourable Satnarine Sharma

7th Chief Justice of Trinidad and Tobago
- In office 2002–2008
- Prime Minister: Patrick Manning
- Preceded by: Michael de la Bastide
- Succeeded by: Ivor Archie

Personal details
- Occupation: Chief Justice

Satnarine Sharma (January 24, 1943 – October 9, 2019) was the Chief Justice of Trinidad and Tobago from 2002 until 2008. He was succeeded by Ivor Archie.

== Early life and education ==
Sharma was born in Curepe to shopkeepers Harripersad and Kowsil. He was educated at Curepe Canadian Mission School, Hillview College, and Naparima College.

Sharma left for England in 1963 where he read law and was called to the bar of Inner Temple in 1966 and was admitted to the bar in Trinidad and Tobago in 1967.

== Career ==
Sharma worked in the civil service before leaving for England in 1963. After completing his legal studies, he returned to Trinidad and Tobago in 1967. He returned to London later that year where he was appointed a judge. In 1968 he returned to Trinidad and Tobago where he worked as a magistrate. In 1984 he was appointed a high court judge, and an appeal court judge in 1988.

Sharma was appointed Chief Justice of Trinidad and Tobago in July 2002. In 2008 he resigned from the position.

=== Controversy ===
In July 2006, Sharma was arrested and accused of trying to help Basdeo Panday, a former prime minister who was sentenced in April to two years in prison for corruption, an action which some perceived as racist. An international tribunal ruled that there was insufficient evidence to remove him from office in December 2007. He however resigned as scheduled in January 2008.

== Personal life ==
Sharma and his wife Kalawaty had two sons.

== Awards and honours ==
Sharma was awarded the Chaconia Medal (Gold) and the Trinity Cross, which was the country's highest national award at the time.
