= Ayanna Dyette =

Trinidad and Tobago volleyball player (1986–2018)

Ayana S. Dyette

Personal information
- Full name: Ayana Sasha Dyette
- Born: 10 January 1986; Trinidad and Tobago
- Died: 1 July 2018 (aged 32)
- Hometown: Diego Martin
- Education: Indian State College, Delaware State University

National team
2010–2016	Trinidad and Tobago

Ayana Sasha Dyette (10 January 1986 – 1 July 2018) was a Trinidad and Tobago volleyball player. She was part of the Trinidad and Tobago women's national volleyball team.

She participated in the 2015 Pan-American Games in Toronto, Canada. She also participated at the FIVB world tour held in United States.

== Education ==
Ayanna was a student of Holy Name Convent, Port-of-Spain, after which she received a volleyball scholarship to attend the Indian State college where she got her degree in Business Administration and Management. She also pursued her Bachelor of Science degree in Business, Management and Marketing and Related support services at the Delaware State University from 2006 to 2008.

== Career ==
Ayanna was the Public Relations Officer during the presidentship of Mushtaque Mohammed.

In February 2014, she worked as the Financial Advisor with the Panamerican Life Insurance.

She was also the Customer Service Representative with RBC bank from October 2012 to April 2013.

== Death ==
She died of cervical cancer on July 1 2018.

== Tributes ==
1. Hon. Shamfa Cudjoe, Minister of Sport and Youth Affairs of Trinidad and Tobago gave Ayanna a tribute.

2. Trinidad and Tobago Olympic Committee

3. The Ayana S. Dyette Foundation for Cervical Cancer (ASDF) was founded by her family for cervical cancer awareness, prevention, and eradication.
