= John Lee Lum =

John Lee Lum (1842 – 1921) was a Chinese-born businessman who was a pioneer of the petroleum industry in Trinidad and Tobago.

== Early life ==
Lee Lum was born in Guangdong, China in 1842. (Note: Tuitt (2024) says 1847) He migrated to California where he worked in gold mines and on the construction of the Transcontinental Railroad. Lee Lum then moved to Canada, Brazil, and British Guiana.

== Trinidad and Tobago ==
Lee Lum moved to Trinidad and Tobago, "practically penniless" at the invitation of Kwong Lee. After working for Kwong Lee for a few years, he opened a general store at 31 Charlotte Street, Port of Spain. His businesses traded in cocoa beans, coffee and copra for export while also dealing in imported goods from China. These developed into trading house Lee Lum and Company. By 1900 he had established a network of village shops all around Trinidad, (Note: Laguardia Martínez (2022) says "some twenty small stores" while Tuitt (2024) "a chain of 60 shops") and recruited labour from China to staff them. Due to a shortage of coins in rural Trinidad Lee Lum established his own system of metal tokens, which were in circulation from 1890 to 1906.

Lee Lum invested in cocoa, owning substantial cocoa estates in central and south Trinidad and coconut plantations. He also established a quarry in Chaguaramas for road material.

Lee Lum was considered the leader of the Chinese community in Trinidad, even after his return to Hong Kong in 1908. He joined the West India Committee and was its only Chinese member. He also financed the completing on the Royal Victoria Institute (now the National Museum and Art Gallery) in Port of Spain.

=== Oil industry ===
Lee Lum observed petroleum seepages on property he owned in Guayaguayare in southeast Trinidad, and collected a sample of it which he took back to Port of Spain. The sample was seen by Randolph Rust, a British-born businessman. Rust had discovered oil seeps in Aripero, in southwest Trinidad, but had been unable to raise the money to attempt to exploit it. Lee Lum agreed to finance Rust's explorations, initially drilling unsuccessful wells in Aripero before drilling in Guayaguayare. In 1906 Lee Lum founded General Petroleum Properties of Trinidad.

Rust and Lee Lum drilled the first commercially successful oil well in Trinidad and Tobago in 1902, but they were unable to ship the petroleum they produced out of Guayaguayare. In 1913, Trinidad Leaseholds Limited acquired the wells Rust and Lee Lum had drilled.

== Personal life ==
Lee Lum had three sons including newspaper editor Aldric Lee Lom. He retired to Hong Kong in 1908 and died in 1921.
