= Louise Horne =

Trinidadian politician and nutritionist (1912–2021)

Louise Horne DCSG (12 May 1912 – 28 March 2021) was a Trinidad and Tobago politician and nutritionist who introduced the school meals programme.

In 2012, she still lived in the house in Arima where she had been born a century earlier, which she had inherited from her parents, and in 2019 was living in a care home in the same area.

Horne served as an independent Senator in the Parliament of Trinidad and Tobago from 1976 to 1991.

She was named Dame of the Order of St. Gregory the Great by Pope John Paul II, one of just two Trinidadian women whom he so honoured.

A postage stamp in her honour was issued in 1980.

In 2003, she published a book, The Evolution of Modern Trinidad and Tobago (Eniath's Printing Company; ISBN 9789768193117).

Louise Horne died in March 2021, at the age of 108.
