= Harold La Borde =

Trinidadian sailor and adventurer (1933–2015)

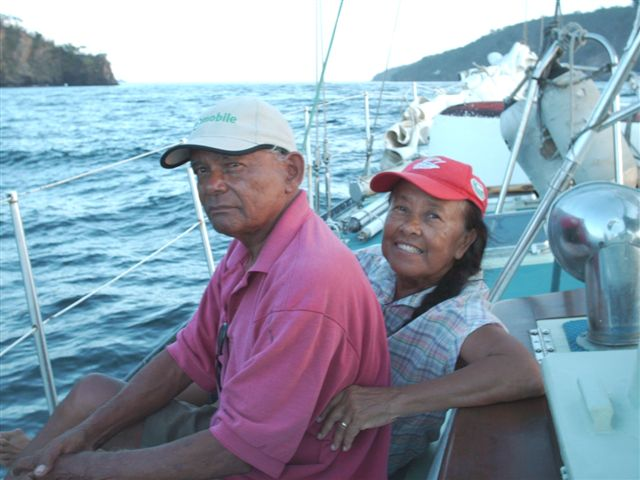
Harold La Borde (left) and his wife Kwailan (right)

Harold La Borde (18 June 1933 – 12 June 2015) was a Trinidadian sailor and adventurer who from 1969 to 1973 circumnavigated the world in his 40-ft ketch Hummingbird II. He was accompanied by his wife, Kwailan, and his five-year-old son Pierre. The couple were the first known Trinidadian sailors to cross the Atlantic (and later to circumnavigate), for which they were awarded the Gold Trinity Cross.

== Biography ==
La Borde was born on 18 June 1933, in Trinidad, West Indies, to parents with mixed ethnicity. He was educated at a local Roman Catholic school and began his sailing career by building dinghies, in which he taught himself the rudiments of seamanship.

La Borde's first book, An Ocean to Ourselves (1962) discusses how he built a 26-foot ketch Humming Bird. Harold and Kwailan, who were married in 1959, made their maiden voyage in the 26-foot vessel, Humming Bird, to England in 1960, together with a friend, Buck Wong Chong. The Humming Bird was subsequently sold, in order to finance the construction of a second, bigger boat.

In 1960, at the early stages of the Nigeria's independence, Harold and Kwailan were invited to work at the Citizenship and Leadership Training Center at Kurra Falls in Nigeria. The centre was funded by the British government with the aim of moulding young leaders. A few years later, they returned to Trinidad to begin construction of the 40-foot ketch Humming Bird II.

The Humming Bird II was completed in three years, and the family set out on 2 February 1969 to circumnavigate the globe. Upon completion, Harold and Kwailan were both awarded their nation's highest award, the Trinity Cross. Their second son, Andre, was born in Auckland, New Zealand, during the trip.

Upon their return home, the 40-foot Humming Bird II was purchased by the Trinidad and Tobago Government in 1973. The boat is now being exhibited in a museum.

The La Bordes went on to another circumnavigation voyage via Cape Horn (1984–86) in the Humming Bird III.

Harold La Borde wrote another two books with input from his family. These were titled All Oceans Blue (1977), and Lonely Oceans South (1987).

Documentary films of their travels were made in conjunction with the Government Film Unit. After retiring from their respective jobs in Trinidad, the La Bordes ran a small family marina in a Trinidad yachting bay. Harold's full-time job was working on the Humming Bird III, while Kwailan finished their autobiography entitled Wind, Sea, and Faith.

La Borde died on 12 June 2016, at the age of 81. He was survived by his wife, Kwailan, sons Pierre and Andre, three grandchildren and his brothers Rudy and Hugh. Kwailan La Borde died on 29 May 2024, at the age of 91.
