= Clive Zanda =

Trinidad and Tobago jazz musician (1939–2022)

- Born: Clive Alexander; 1939; Siparia, Trinidad and Tobago
- Died: 6 January 2022 (aged 82); Port of Spain, Trinidad and Tobago
- Occupation: Jazz musician

Clive Alexander (15 June 1939 – 6 January 2022), better known as Clive Zanda, was a Trinidad and Tobago extempo and kaisojazz musician who was regarded as a pioneer of the genre.

== Early life and education ==
Alexander was born in Siparia, in South Trinidad, the first of nine children born to Richard and Louisa Alexander. His father, a shoemaker, guitarist, vocalist and church music leader, was born in St. Vincent. His mother, a homemaker, florist and gospel singer, was born in Grenada. His brother, Carlton Alexander, is a steelpan arranger and jazz musician.

After completing primary school and obtaining a School Leaving Certificate, Alexander applied for an apprenticeship in the oil fields, hoping to be selected for a drafting apprenticeship. When this did not happen, he took a correspondence course in architecture while assisting his father as a shoemaker. A district engineer, visiting the shop, noticed the quality of his architectural drawings and got him an apprenticeship as a trainee draftsman.

In 1959 he migrated to the United Kingdom to study architecture.

== Career ==
Zanda began making music as a child using homemade cardboard bongos. He started taking classical piano lessons when he was 15, but his teacher soon left him to his own devices after he started improvising. He moved to London to continue his studies because he did not see music as a viable career path. His experience with live jazz music in London inspired him to pursue the musical form. After training with composer Michael Grant he formed his own combo and worked on the fusion of calypso and jazz.

Zanda returned to Trinidad and Tobago in 1969 at the height of the Black Power movement. Working with Scofield Pilgrim, a music teacher at Queen's Royal College, he began hosting workshops he called Gayap sessions, to teach musicians and build a community where musicians could learn from one another. He continued to host Gayap sessions in an annex attached to his architectural firm.

After completing his studies, he returned to Trinidad and Tobago where he continued to develop extempo/kaiso jazz. He coined the term kaisojazz to refer to this fusion of calypso, folk music and jazz. In 1976 he released his first album, Clive Zanda is Here! With Dat Kinda Ting. This was followed by three more albums - Piano Vibrations (2016), Pantastic Visions Revisited (2000, 2014), and Pan Jazz Conversations (2003).

== Personal life and death ==
Zanda died from complications of diabetes on 6 January 2022, at the age of 82.
