= Gulfstream (tank barge) =

Oil tanker

Gulfstream is a capsized unpowered 449-foot (137 m) 60,000 bbl (9,500 m^{3}) double-hulled barge, part of an articulated tug and barge system, without a registration number. The vessel capsized on 7 February 2024 and was abandoned by the crew. It caused a huge spillage of oil in the Caribbean Sea.

== History ==
In February 2024, the barge, carrying an estimated 35,000 barrels of fuel oil, capsized after running aground on a reef some 150 metres (490 ft) off the south coast of Tobago. The circumstances of the capsizing are not yet clear. The oil spill has spread to Grenada and could potentially affect Venezuela.

The Government of Trinidad and Tobago confirmed the situation and considered declaring a national emergency. It has reportedly affected the fishing and tourism industries. The National Office of Disaster Preparedness and Management (ODPM) said that the oil spill had affected around 15 kilometres (9 miles) of the coastline. Emergency workers were sent to run a major clean up operation. Authorities are attempting to pinpoint the ship's origin.

Farley Augustine, the Chief Secretary of Tobago, said: 'We need those responsible to come clean and we need those responsible to know that they have to pay for this mess, that they are culpable as part of this mess'.

This reportedly threatens an environmental catastrophe. According to Bellingcat, the barge may have started leaking oil on 7 February. The identity and whereabouts of the tug that was hauling the barge are not yet known. By 28 February, oil began to wash ashore on Bonaire in the Leeward Antilles. These beaches are hundreds of miles away from where the ship capsized.

On 21 August 2024, the Government of Trinidad and Tobago confirmed that the barge had been successfully re-floated.
