= Guayaguayare =

- Village
- Interactive map of Guayaguayare
- Coordinates: 10.133333°N 61.033333°W
- Country: Trinidad and Tobago
- Region: Mayaro-Rio Claro
- ISO 3166 code: TT-MRC

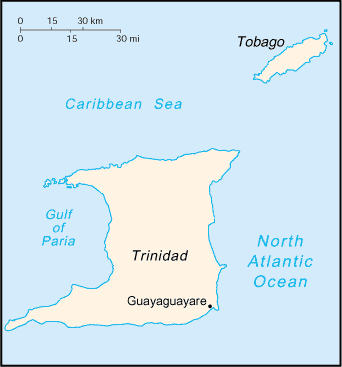
Location of Guayaguayare in Trinidad and Tobago.

Guayaguayare is the southeasternmost village in Trinidad and Tobago. It lies at the southern end of the county of Mayaro. Guayaguayare (often simply called Guaya) is primarily a fishing village, but it also plays a major role in the petroleum industry. The largest petroleum producers in the country - BP Trinidad & Tobago (bpTT), BHP and Petrotrin all have major presences here and bpTT controls the Port of Guayaguayare, which services most of the offshore petroleum production in Trinidad. The major natural gas pipelines, serving Atlantic LNG in Point Fortin and the Point Lisas Industrial Estate, come ashore here.

Guayaguayare was the first area in Trinidad sighted by Christopher Columbus on July 31, 1498. The area along Guayaguayare Bay, between the Lizard River (originally Rio de Iguanas) and the Pilote River (Rio de Pilotas) was settled by French planters and their slaves in the late eighteenth century following the 1783 Cedula de Población.

Guayaguayare also has a prominent place in the history of the oil industry - it was the site of the first commercially viable wells drilled in Trinidad by Randolph Rust and John Lee Lum in May 1902.

It is the birthplace of Jillian Richardson, who won a silver medal for Canada at the 1984 Olympics, in the 4x400 metres, and of renowned writer Dionne Brand. Brand explores her early life in Guayaguayare in her 2001 piece A Map to the Door of No Return.
