= Arena Massacre =

1669 unrest in Trinidad

The Arena Massacre or Arena Uprising took place on 1 December 1699 in Trinidad at the mission of San Fernando de los Arenales, east Trinidad. It resulted in the death of several hundred Amerindians, Roman Catholic priests connected with the mission of San Francisco de los Arenales, the Spanish Governor José de León y Echales and all but one member of his party.

Amerindians tied to the Church's encomienda at the mission at Arena revolted, killing the priests and desecrating the church. They then ambushed the governor and his party, who were on their way to visit the church. Among those killed in the governor's party was Fr. Juan Mazien de Sotomayor, O.P., missionary priest to the Nepuyo villages of Cuara, Tacarigua and Arouca. One member of the governor's party managed to escape the attackers and returned to San Jose where he raised the alarm.

== Aftermath ==
The rebels hastily buried the bodies of the monks, threw the governor's body into the river and headed for the coast. On December 3, 1699, a Spanish search party found some dead bodies. On December 5, a Spanish force set out to find the Amerindians behind the massacre. The Spanish force overtook the Amerindians at Comcal and drove them to Cocal. Many dived into the sea in preference to being captured. Eighty-four rebels were captured and sixty-one of them were shot. The surviving Indigenous people were interrogated via torture. Many of the tortured revealed that they were often beaten by the priests for not attending church services. The twenty-two identified as ringleaders were hanged on 14 January 1700 at San José de Oruña, the capital of the colony, and their dismembered bodies displayed. The women of the tribe were distributed among the Spanish households as slaves.

== Miracles ==
In April 1701 a party set out to recover the bodies of the Capuchin monks. According to the official history of the Capuchins, written by Fr. Mateo de Anguiano in 1704, the ground was still wet with fresh blood, and the bodies of the monks were uncorrupted, bleeding from their wounds when they were moved. The bodies were taken to the main church where they lay in state for nine days.

In 1885 Dominican Fr. Cothonay claimed to have found the site of the Mission of San Francisco de los Arenales. In addition to physical evidence he cited Amerindian traditions that on Holy Thursday and Good Friday every year, "remarkable things happened" and some claimed to have heard voices, talking and singing, a priest saying Mass and people praying.
