= Santa Rosa First Peoples Community =

Indigenous organisation in Trinidad and Tobago

The Santa Rosa First Peoples Community is the major organisation of Indigenous people in Trinidad and Tobago. Amerindians from the former encomiendas of Tacarigua and Arauca (Arouca) were resettled to Arima between 1784 and 1786. The SRCC was incorporated in 1973 to maintain a role in the annual Santa Rosa Festival (dedicated to Santa Rosa de Lima, the first Catholic saint canonised in the New World).

The SRCC is headed by its president Ricardo Bharath Hernandez and maintains a leadership role among Indigenous organisations in Trinidad. The community is also the base for the Carib Queen.

The Amerindians were relocated to open their lands for settlement by the influx of French settlers brought in by the Cedula of Population and to separate the Indigenous people from the newcomers (see: History of Trinidad and Tobago). The Mission was granted 1000 acres (4 km²) of land by Governor José María Chacón, and Governor Ralph Woodford added 320 acres (1.3 km²). However, as the Mission gradually dissolved, these lands were seized by the state.

== See also ==
- Indigenous peoples of the Caribbean
- Kalinago
