= Paula-Mae Weekes =

President of Trinidad and Tobago from 2018 to 2023

Her Excellency Paula-Mae Weekes ORTT
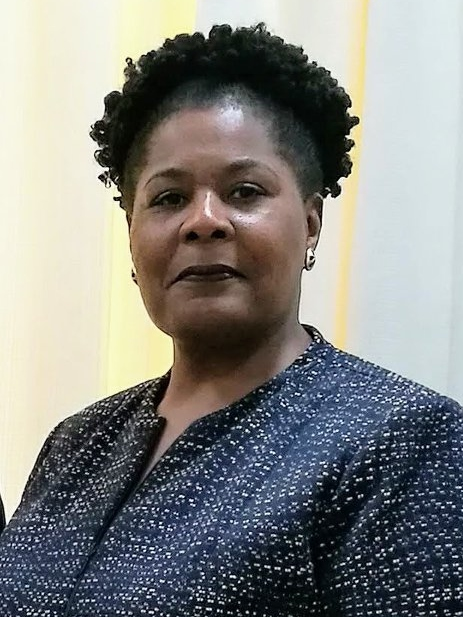
- Weekes in 2019

6th President of Trinidad and Tobago
- In office 19 March 2018 – 20 March 2023
- Prime Minister: Keith Rowley
- Preceded by: Anthony Carmona
- Succeeded by: Christine Kangaloo

Personal details
- Born: 23 December 1958 (age 67) Port of Spain, Trinidad and Tobago
- Party: Independent
- Education: University of the West Indies, Cave Hill; Hugh Wooding Law School

Paula-Mae Weekes ORTT (born 23 December 1958) is a Trinidadian politician and jurist who was the sixth president of Trinidad and Tobago from 2018 to 2023. She is the first female President of Trinidad and Tobago, the second female head of state after Queen Elizabeth II, and the second woman of African ancestry to become a president in the western hemisphere, following Ertha Pascal-Trouillot of Haiti.

== Career ==
Weekes attended Bishop Anstey High School, the University of the West Indies, Cave Hill, from which she graduated with a Bachelor of Laws degree, and the Hugh Wooding Law School; she was called to the Bar in 1982. After graduation she worked in the office of the Director of Public Prosecutions for 11 years, before going into private practice in 1993. She was appointed to the judiciary in 1996 and to the Court of Appeals in 2005, where she served until her retirement in 2016. She served briefly as acting Chief Justice in 2012 after acting Chief Justice Wendell Kangaloo was injured in a car accident. In September 2016 Weekes was appointed to the appeals court in the Turks and Caicos.

== Presidency ==
On 5 January 2018, Weekes, then a judge of the Turks and Caicos Islands Court of Appeal, was put forward as a presidential candidate by the People's National Movement government of Prime Minister Keith Rowley in hopes of reaching a consensus with the United National Congress-led parliamentary opposition of Kamla Persad-Bissessar, which later endorsed her nomination. Her proposal for the post of president was also lauded by political analysts. As Weekes was the only nominated candidate on election day, she was deemed elected without the need for a vote.

== Life after politics ==
In 2023, United Nations Secretary General António Guterres appointed Weekes as co-chair of the United Nations High-Level Panel on the Teaching Profession, alongside Kersti Kaljulaid.

== Other activities ==
- Council of Women World Leaders, Member

Political offices
Preceded by Anthony Carmona	President of Trinidad and Tobago; 2018–2023	Succeeded by Christine Kangaloo
