= History of Trinidad and Tobago =

The history of Trinidad and Tobago begins with the settlements of the islands by Indigenous First Peoples. Trinidad was visited by Christopher Columbus on his third voyage in 1498, (he never landed in Tobago), and claimed in the name of Spain. Trinidad was administered by Spanish hands until 1797, but it was largely settled by French colonists. Tobago changed hands between the British, French, Dutch, and Courlanders, but eventually ended up in British hands following the second Treaty of Paris (1814). In 1889, the two islands were incorporated into a single political entity. Trinidad and Tobago obtained its independence from the British Empire in 1962 and became a republic in 1976.

== Pre-Columbian period ==
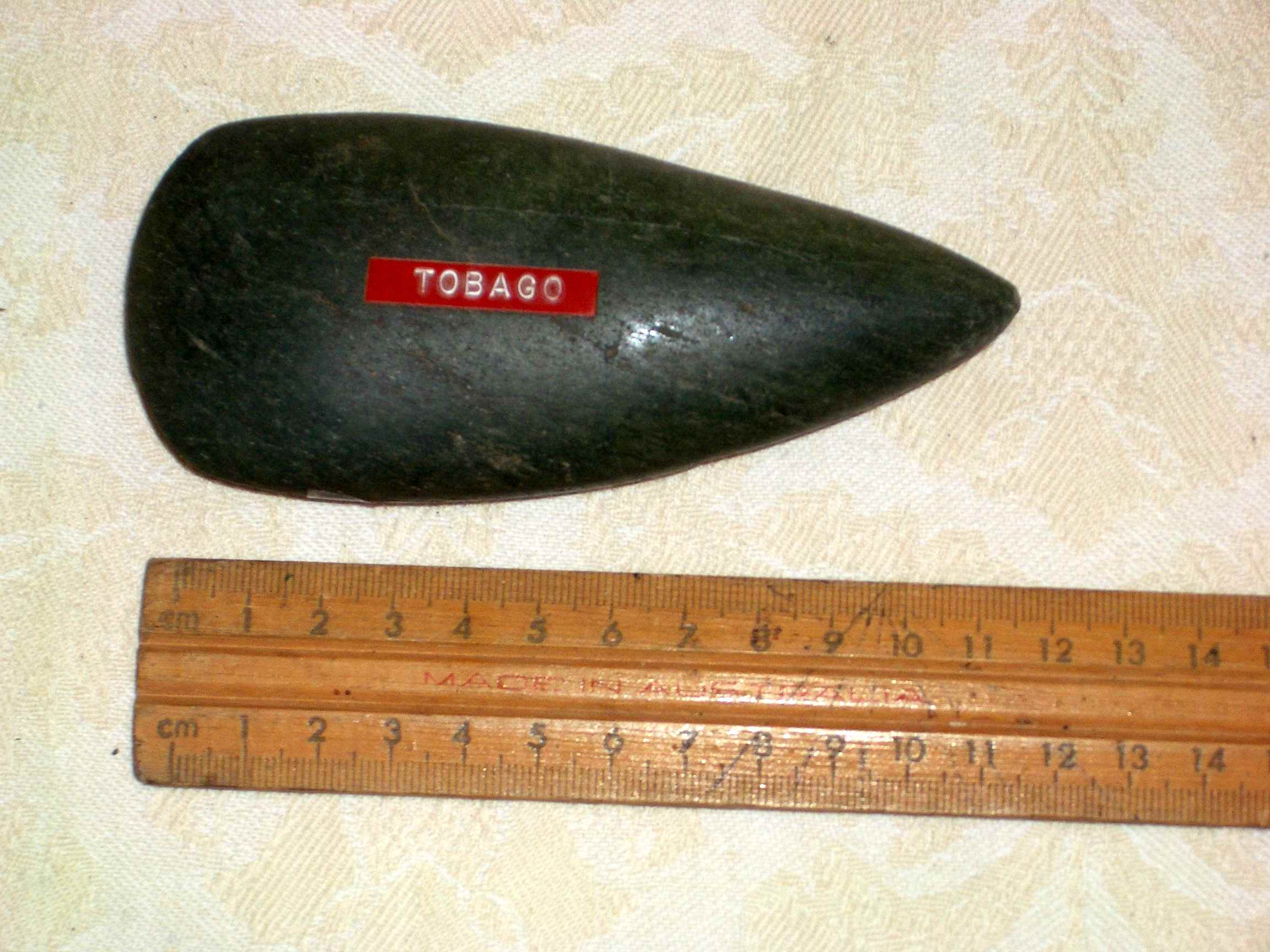
Green stone ceremonial axe. From shell midden, Mt Irvine Bay, Tobago, 1957

Human settlement in Trinidad dates back at least 7,000 years. The earliest settlers, termed Archaic or Ortoiroid, are believed to have settled Trinidad and Tobago from modern-day Venezuela from northeastern South America around 4000 BCE. Twenty-nine Archaic sites have been identified, mostly in south Trinidad and Tobago; this includes the 7,000-year-old Banwari Trace site which is the oldest discovered human settlement in the eastern Caribbean. Archaic populations were pre-ceramic, and dominated the area until about 200 BCE.

Around 250 BCE the first ceramic-using people in the Caribbean, the Saladoid people, entered Trinidad and Tobago. The earliest evidence of these people come from around 2100 BC along the banks of the Orinoco River in Venezuela. From Trinidad and Tobago, they are believed to have moved north into the remaining islands of the Caribbean. Thirty-seven Saladoid sites have been identified in Trinidad and Tobago, and are located all over the island.

After 250 CE a third group, called the Barrancoid people settled in southern Trinidad and Tobago after migrating up the Orinoco River toward the sea. The oldest Barrancoid settlement appears to have been at Erin, on the south coast.

Following the collapse of Barrancoid communities along the Orinoco around 650 CE, a new group, called the Arauquinoid expanded up the river to the coast. The cultural artefacts of this group were only partly adopted in Trinidad and Tobago and adjacent areas of northeast Venezuela, and as a result, this culture is called Guayabitoid in these areas.

Around 1300 CE a new group appears to have settled in Trinidad and Tobago and introduced new cultural attributes which largely replaced the Guayabitoid culture. Termed the Mayoid cultural tradition, this represents the native tribes which were present in Trinidad and Tobago at the time of European arrival. Their distinct pottery and artifacts survive until 1800, but after this time they were largely assimilated into mainstream Trinidad and Tobago society. These included the Nepoya (Napuyos) and Shebaya (Sapoyos) (who were probably Arawak-speaking) and the Yao (Iao) (who were probably Carib-speaking). They have generally been called Arawaks and Caribs. These were largely wiped out by the Spanish colonisers under the encomienda system. Under this system which was basically a form of slavery, Spanish encomederos forced the Amerindians to work for them in exchange for Spanish "protection" and conversion to Christianity. The survivors were first organised into Missions by the Capuchin friars, and then gradually assimilated. The Yao disappear from historical records after 1598.

== Spanish administration ==
=== Arrival of Columbus ===
The first-ever contact with Europeans occurred when Christopher Columbus, who was on his third voyage of exploration, arrived at noon on 31 July 1498. He landed at a harbor he called Point Galera, while naming the island Trinidad, before proceeding into the Gulf of Paria via the Serpent's Mouth and the Caribbean Sea via Dragon's Mouth. Tobago was seen by Columbus on 14 August 1498. He did not land, but named the island Belaforme, "because from a distance it seemed beautiful".

=== Colonial settlement of Trinidad ===
Trinidad is reported to have been densely populated at the beginning of the colonial period. Although in 1510, Trinidad was said to have the only "peaceful Indians" along the whole South American coast, demand for slaves to supply the pearl-fisheries in nearby Isla Margarita led to them being declared "Caribs" (and thus, fair game for slavers) in 1511. As a consequence of this, Trinidad and Tobago became the focus of Spanish slaving raids, primarily to supply Margarita's pearl fisheries.

In 1530, Antonio Sedeño was appointed governor. Granted a contract to settle Trinidad, with an eye toward discovering long-rumored El Dorado and controlling the trade in slaves, in 1532 he attempted to establish a settlement, but was driven off the island following the Battle of Cumucurapo, (or The Place of the Silk Cotton Tree). He withdrew to Margarita, but he returned a year later and built a stockade at Cumucurapo (modern Mucurapo in what is now Port of Spain).On 13 September 1533, the second battle of Cumucurapo began, and Sedeño prevailed and rebuilt the fortifications. Sedeño was forced to withdraw a few months later in 1534, as his men left him to follow Francisco Pizarro in Peru.

In 1569, Juan Troche Ponce de León built the "town of the Circumcision", probably around modern Laventille. In 1570, this settlement was abandoned. In 1592, Antonio de Berrio established the first lasting settlement, the town of San José de Oruña (the modern St. Joseph). Sir Walter Raleigh, who was searching for El Dorado, arrived in Trinidad on 22 March 1595 and soon attacked San José and captured and interrogated de Berrío, obtaining much information from him and from the cacique Topiawari.

Lack of Spanish ships arriving on a regular basis forced the settlers to trade with the English, French and Dutch, in violation of the Spanish Exclusive. The Spanish also lacked the means to defend the colony, which consisted of only 24 Spanish settlers in 1625. Thus, the Dutch attacked St. Joseph with impunity in 1637. By 1671, the island included 80 settlers and 80 "domesticated" Amerindians.

By 1772, the Spanish capital of St. Joseph had a population of 326 Spaniards and 417 Amerindians. Yet the houses consisted of mud huts with thatch roofs. In general, lacking gold, the island was poor and undeveloped, inducing many to leave.

The Captaincy General of Venezuela was created on 8 September 1777, through the Royal Decree of Graces of Charles III of Bourbon, to provide more autonomy for the provinces of Venezuela (include Trinidad), previously under the jurisdiction of the Viceroyalty of New Granada and the Audiencia of Santo Domingo. The crown established a unified government in political (governorship), military (captaincy general), fiscal (intendancy) and judicial (audiencia) affairs. Its creation was part of the Bourbon Reforms and laid the groundwork for the future nation of Venezuela, in particular by orienting the province of Maracaibo towards the province of Caracas.

=== Colonial settlement of Tobago ===
In Tobago, the first Dutch colony of Nieuw-Walcheren ("New Walcheren") was short-lived. 68 colonists established Fort Vlissingen ("Fort Flushing") near modern Plymouth in 1628. They were reinforced by a few hundred more settlers from Zeeland in 1629 and 1632. Attempted colonies by Courland in 1637, 1639, and 1642 and England in 1639, 1642, and 1647 all failed.

In May and September 1654, Courish and Dutch colonies were reestablished successfully. The Courish colony of Neu-Kurland ("New Courland") was centered at Fort Jacob on Great Courland Bay. The Dutch colony on the other side of the island had three forts: Lampsinsberg, Beveren, and Bellavista. In 1658, 500 Frenchmen joined the Dutch colony but formed their own settlement called Three Rivers (Le Quartier des trois Rivières). On 11 December 1659, the Courlanders peaceably surrendered their colony to the Dutch. At the time, the island held about 1,500 Europeans and around 7,000 African slaves working on 120 plantations, supporting six or seven sugar mills and two rum distilleries.

British Jamaican pirates captured the island in January 1666; the official English garrison surrendered to a French attack in August the same year. The Dutch admiral Abraham Crijnssen reclaimed a deserted colony in April 1667 and reestablished a fort. An attempt to restore the Courish Fort Jacob was suppressed in December 1668. In December, 1672, the British attacked and destroyed the Dutch colony as part of the Third Anglo-Dutch War. Dutch control was regained under the status quo ante provisions of the Second Treaty of Westminster in 1674; in September 1676, Fort Sterreschans was constructed near the ruins of Fort Vlissingen. This star fort was reinforced in February 1677, but French attacks in February, March, and December of that year finally succeeded in killing the Dutch governor and capturing the island.

The Treaty of Aix-la-Chappelle in 1748 designated Tobago neutral territory. Amerindians from Venezuela who sought to avoid being forced to settle in Capuchin mission villages, and Island Caribs from St. Vincent who sought to escape conflict with the Black Caribs, were among the groups who settled there in this period.

=== Spanish missions in Trinidad ===
Spanish missions were established as part of the Spanish colonization here as in its other new New World conquests. In 1687, the Catalan Capuchin friars were given responsibility for the conversion of the indigenous population of Trinidad and the Guianas. Tensions between priests and Amerindians led to the Arena Massacre of 1699, wherein the Amerindians murdered the priests. After being hunted by the Spanish, the survivors are reported to have committed suicide by jumping off cliffs into the sea. In 1713, the missions were handed over to the secular clergy. Due to shortages of missionaries, although the missions were established they often went without Christian instruction for long periods of time.

Between 1687 and 1700, several missions were founded in Trinidad, but only four survived as Amerindian villages throughout the 18th century – La Anuncíata de Nazaret de Savana Grande (modern Princes Town), Purísima Concepción de María Santísima de Guayri (modern San Fernando), Santa Ana de Savaneta (modern Savonetta), Nuestra Señora de Montserrate (probably modern Mayo). The mission of Santa Rosa de Arima was established in 1789 when Amerindians from the former encomiendas of Tacarigua and Arauca (Arouca) were relocated further east and settled in Santa Rosa close to today's town of Arima).

=== French settlement in Trinidad ===
Although Spanish settlement began in the 16th century, the census of 1777 recorded only 2,763 people as living on the island, including some 2,000+ Arawaks.

In 1777, Roume de St Laurent proposed French planters from the islands of Martinique, Guadeloupe, Dominica, St. Lucia, St. Vincent and Grenada, and their African slaves, immigrate to Trinidad. He estimated 1,532 whites, with 33,322 of their slaves, would be interested in such a proposal.

The Spanish gave many incentives to lure settlers to the island, including exemption from taxes for ten years and land grants in accordance to the terms set out in the Cedula. In 1783, the proclamation of a Cedula of Population by the Spanish Crown granted 32 acres (129,000 m^{2}) of land to each Roman Catholic who settled in Trinidad and half as much for each slave that they brought. Uniquely, 16 acres (65,000 m^{2}) was offered to each Free Coloured or Free Person of Colour (gens de couleur libre, as they were later known), and half as much for each slave they brought. French planters with their slaves, free coloureds and mulattos from neighboring islands of Grenada, Guadeloupe, Martinique and Dominica migrated to the Trinidad during the French Revolution. These new immigrants establishing local communities of Blanchisseuse, Champs Fleurs, Paramin, Cascade, Carenage and Laventille. This resulted in Trinidad having the unique feature of a large French-speaking Free Coloured slave-owning class.

By the time the island was surrendered to the British in 1797, the population had increased to 17,643: 2,086 whites, 4,466 free people of colour, 1,082 Amerindians, and 10,009 African slaves. In addition, there were 159 sugar estates, 130 coffee estates, 60 cocoa estates, and 103 cotton estates. Yet, the island remained unfortified.

== British administration ==
=== Tobago ===
The Treaty of Paris in 1763 ended Tobago's status as a neutral territory and brought it under British control. A plantation economy was quickly established on the island. Under the direction of the Board of Trade, the island was surveyed and sold to planters. In 1781, as part of the Anglo-French War, France captured Tobago. The island was ceded to France in 1783 under the terms of the Treaty of Paris.

The British recapture the island during the War of the First Coalition. British forces from Barbados under the command of Cornelius Cuyler captured the island 1781. Tobago was returned to France in 1802 under the Treaty of Amiens, but recaptured by the British when war broke out again in 1803. France formally surrendered Tobago to Britain under the terms of the 1814 Treaty of Paris.

==== Slavery ====
The Tobagonian economy in the late eighteenth and early nineteenth century was completely dependent on slavery, both for plantation and domestic labour. Sugar production dominated the island's economy, and more than 90% of the enslaved population was employed on the sugar estates. The enslaved population grew from 14,170 in 1790 to 16,190 and reached 18,153 in 1807, the year the slave trade was abolished, and declined to 16,080 by 1813. Slavery was regulated by the Slave Act (formally An Act for the Good Order and Government of Slaves) of 1775. Slaves were considered property, with no intrinsic rights.

==== Emancipation and metayage ====
Declining sugar prices led to a downturn in the economy of the West Indian islands, including Tobago. After Emancipation in 1838, economic conditions did not improve. The 1846 Sugar Duties Act removed protections for British West Indian sugar, forcing it to compete with foreign-grown sugar, which was cheaper to produce, and beet sugar, which was subsidised.

Given a lack of money to pay labourers, planters in Tobago resorted to metayage, a form of sharecropping. In this system, planters provided the land, planting stocks, transport and machinery to manufacture sugar while the workers (metayers) provided the labour to cultivate and harvest the canes and operate the sugar mill.

First introduced in Tobago in 1843, it became the general form of production by 1845 and remained the dominant mode of production in Tobago until the end of the nineteenth century, when sugar production was finally abandoned.

=== Trinidad ===
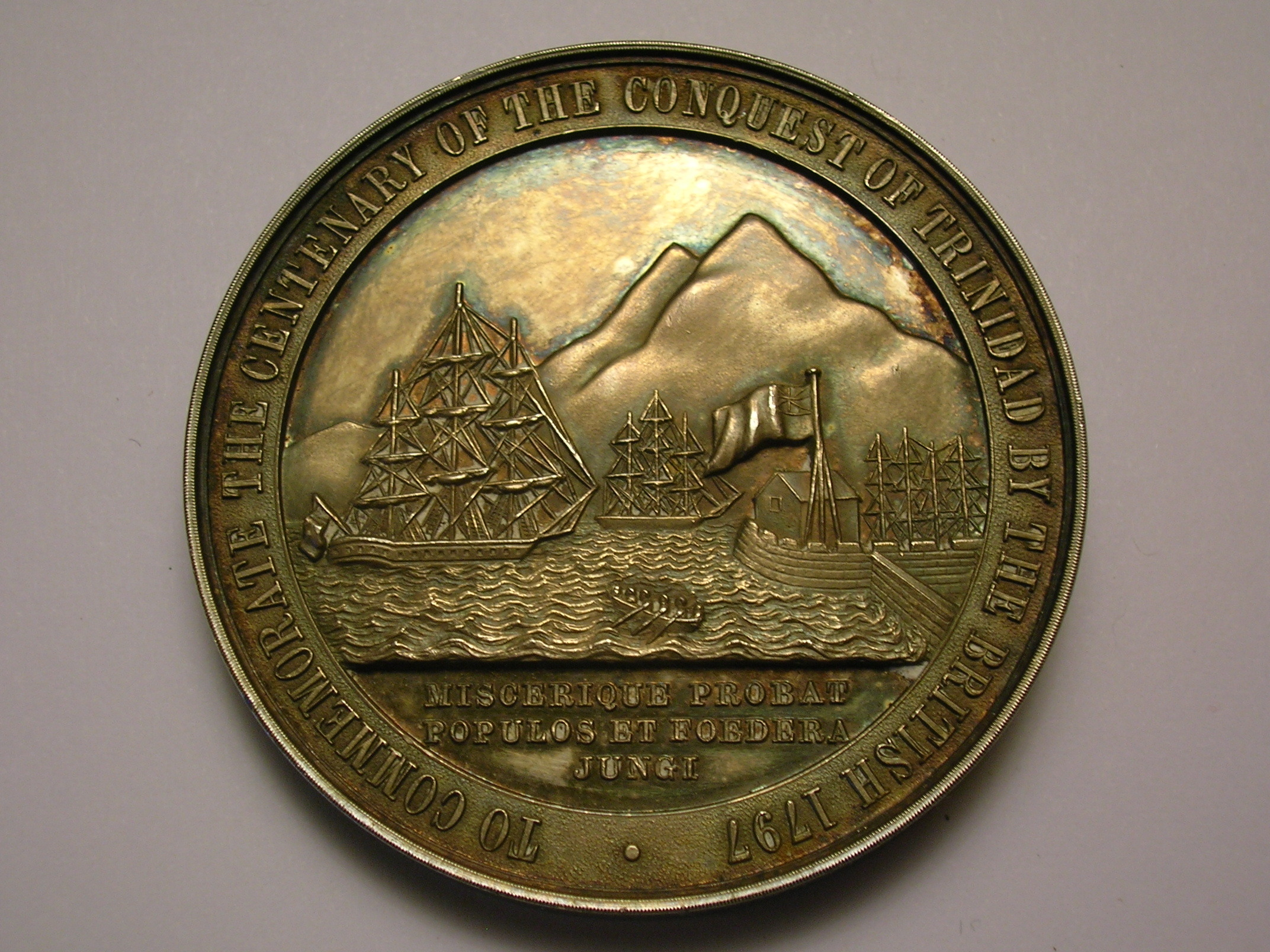
A medallion commemorating the capture of Trinidad and Tobago by the British in 1797

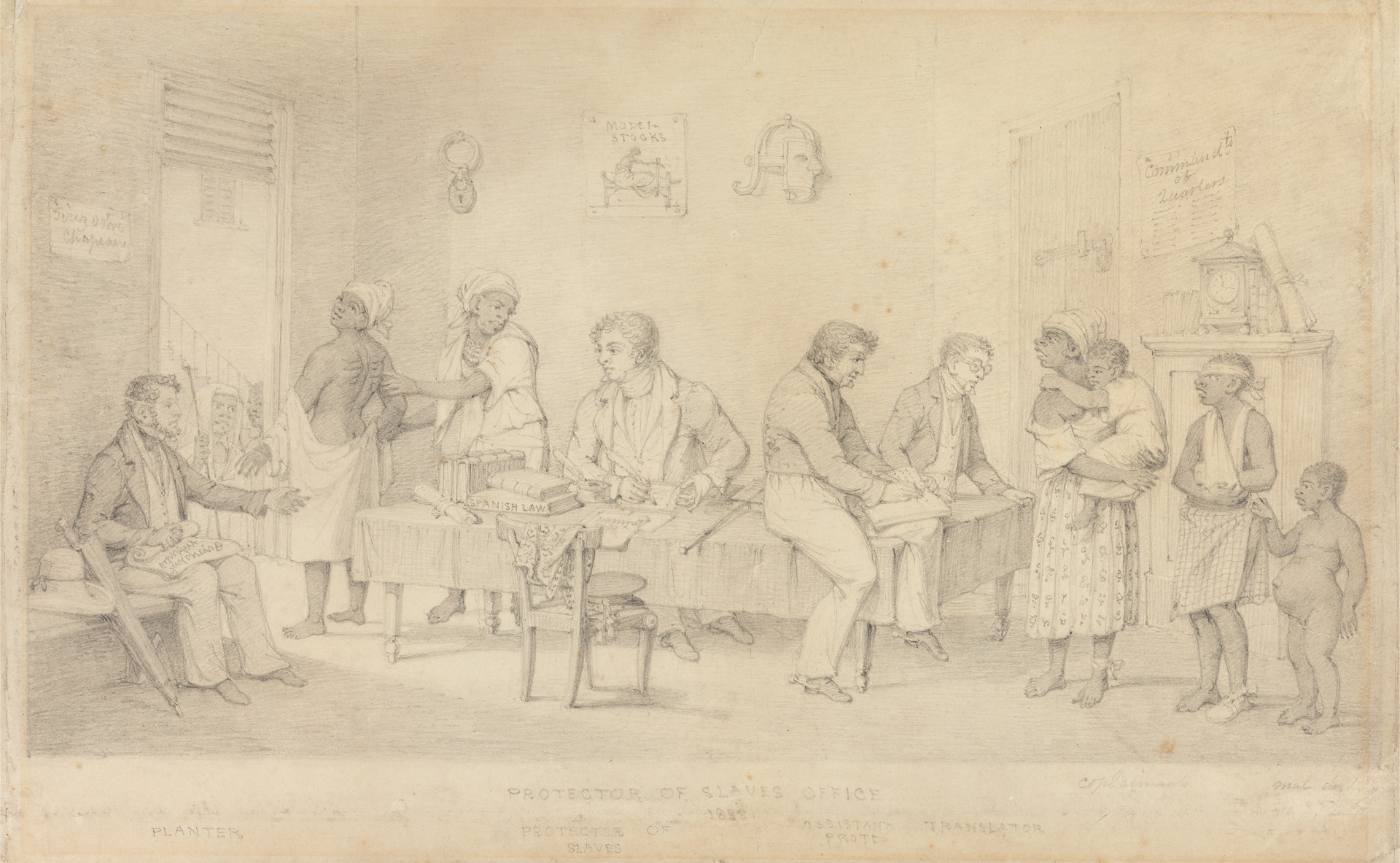
Protector of Slaves Office (Trinidad), Richard Bridgens, c. 1833

In 1797, a British force led by General Sir Ralph Abercromby launched the invasion of Trinidad. His squadron sailed through the Bocas and anchored off the coast of Chaguaramas. The Spanish Governor Chacón decided to capitulate without fighting. Trinidad thus became a British crown colony, with a French-speaking population and Spanish laws. British rule was formalized under the Treaty of Amiens (1802).

In 1808, Port-of-Spain was destroyed by fire. At that time, it was a sprawling town of wood and shingle that had grown tremendously during the previous twenty-five years. As a result of this disaster, the Government brought in legislation regarding building regulations, and for this reason the government building were built of brick to replace the previous ones, all of which had been destroyed by the fire.

British rule led to an influx of settlers from the United Kingdom and the British colonies of the Eastern Caribbean. English, Scots, Irish, German and Italian families arrived. Under British rule, new estates were created and the import of slaves did increase, but this was the period of abolitionism in England and the slave trade was under attack. Slavery was abolished in 1833, after which former slaves served an "apprenticeship" period which ended on 1 August 1838 with full emancipation. An overview of the populations statistics in 1838, however, clearly reveals the contrast between Trinidad and its neighbouring islands: upon emancipation of the slaves in 1838, Trinidad had only 17,439 slaves, with 80% of slave owners having fewer than 10 slaves each. In contrast, at twice the size of Trinidad, Jamaica had roughly 360,000 slaves.

==== End of slavery ====
In August 1816, seven hundred former slaves from the Americas arrived, having served for fourteen months in the (second British) Corps of Colonial Marines at the Royal Naval Dockyard, Bermuda. After rejecting British government orders for transfer to the West India Regiments, and on the Admiralty refusing to continue responsibility for them, they finally accepted, but only with reluctance, a government offer of settlement in Trinidad. These ex-Colonial Marines (aka "Merikens") were organised by the authorities in villages according to their military companies (so-called "company towns").

An attempt was made to delay the full abolition of slavery in 1833. The first announcement from Whitehall in England that slaves would be totally freed by 1840 was made in 1833. In the meantime, slaves on plantations were expected to remain where they were and work as "apprentices" for the next six years.

Trinidad and Tobago demonstrated a successful use of non-violent protest and passive resistance. On 1 August 1834, an unarmed group of mainly elderly ex-slaves being addressed by the governor at Government House about the new laws, began chanting: "Pas de six ans. Point de six ans" ("Not six years. No six years"), drowning out the voice of the governor.

Peaceful protests continued until a resolution to abolish apprenticeship was passed and de facto freedom was achieved. This may have been partially due to the influence of Dr. Jean Baptiste Phillipe's book A Free Mulatto (1824). At the request of Governor Sir George Fitzgerald Hill, on 25 July, "Dr. Jean Baptiste Phillipe the first coloured member of the Council, proposed a resolution to end apprenticeship and this was passed. [...] Full emancipation for all was finally legally granted ahead of schedule on 1 August 1838."

=== Trinidad and Tobago ===
In 1887, the British Parliament passed the Trinidad and Tobago Act, which authorised the union of Trinidad and Tobago. The goal of the union was to pass the cost of administering Tobago from the British crown to the more prosperous colony of Trinidad. On 17 November 1888, the Act was proclaimed, and the union took effect on 1 January 1889. The islands were united under a single administrative structure, which was based in Port of Spain, and a single governor, who had formerly been the governor of Trinidad. The Supreme Court in Trinidad gained authority over Tobago and had the power to appoint magistrates. Tobago's status was downgraded to that of a ward in 1899, with the warden of Tobago as the chief government official on the island.

==== Agricultural development and indentured labour ====
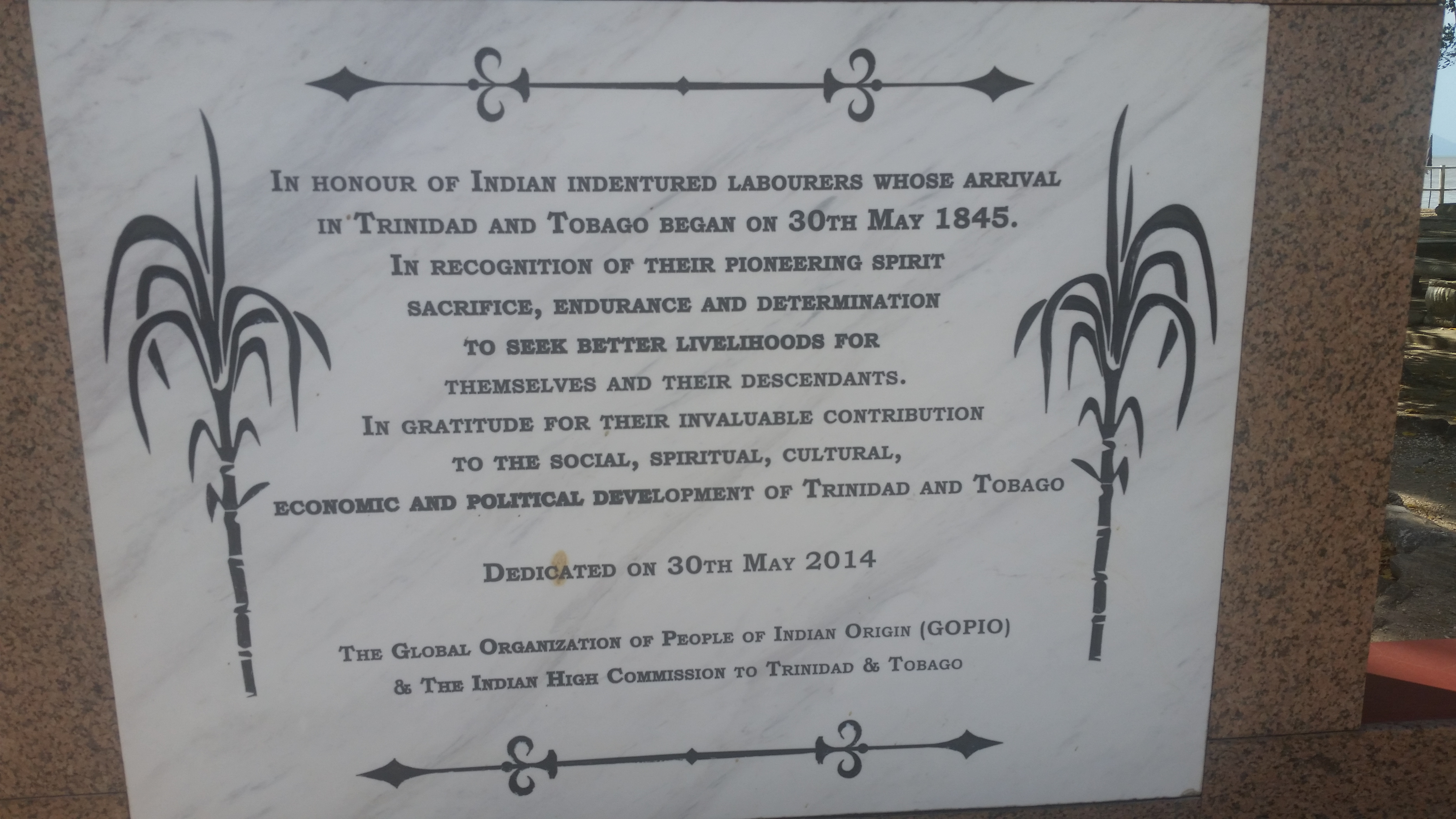
Temple in the Sea historical marker

The sugarcane plantations which dominated the economy of Trinidad and Tobago in the 19th century gradually gave ground to the cultivation of cacao. Trinidad and Tobago chocolate became a high-priced, much sought-after commodity. The Colonial government opened land to settlers interested in establishing cacao estates. French Creoles (white Trinidadian elites descended from the original French settlers) were being marginalised economically by large English business concerns who were buying up sugar plantations, and this gave them a fresh avenue of economic development.

Venezuelan farmers with experience in cacao cultivation were also encouraged to settle in Trinidad and Tobago, where they provided much of the early labour in these estates. Many of the former cocoa-producing areas of Trinidad retain a distinctly Spanish flavour and many of the descendants of the Cocoa panyols (from 'espagnol') remain in these areas including Trinidad.

In 1844, the British Government allowed the immigration of 2,500 Indian workers as indentured servants, from Calcutta and Madras. According to Williams, this was an effort to provide "an adequate and dependable supply of labour." One third of the cost of passage, including return, was to borne as a public expense. Additional funds were provided for the Office of Protector of Immigrants, medical and police services. Wages were set at $2.40 per month for males, and $1.45 per month for females. In 1899, the working day was fixed at 9 hours. They could buy a plot of land in exchange for return passage. Between 1838 and 1917, 145,000 Indians immigrated to Trinidad. There were also workers brought from China at about the same time:

In Trinidad there were, about twenty years ago [i.e. ca.-1886], 4,000 or 5,000 Chinese, but they have decreased to probably about 2,000 or 3,000, [2,200 in 1900]. They used to work in sugar plantations, but are now principally shopkeepers, as well as general merchants, miners and railway builders, etc.

Many Indian immigrants who had completed their indentureship also established cocoa estates, most notable of them being Haji Gokool Meah, a Kashmiri-born immigrant who went on to become one of the wealthiest men in Trinidad and Tobago. The Indian community has steadily prospered and grown until now it makes up about 35% of the population of the nation (the largest ethnic group by about 1%).

The arrival of witches' broom and black pod diseases in the 1930s, coupled with the Great Depression, destroyed the cacao industry in Trinidad and Tobago. Although prices for Trinidad and Tobago cocoa beans remains high on the world markets, cocoa is no more than a marginal crop. Relations between the Indian immigrants, and both the British, and the black population were generally strained, and occasionally erupted into violence such as the 1884 Hosay massacre.

==== Discovery of oil ====
The American Merrimac Oil Company drilled an early oil well at La Brea at Trinidad and Tobago in 1857, where oil was struck at 280 feet (85 m). Also mentioned is the pioneering work of Capt. Darwent with his Paria Petroleum Company Limited, and Conrad F. Stollmeyer (who was great-grandfather of Republic Bank's then chairman, former West Indies cricket captain, Jeffrey Stollmeyer), an entrepreneur of that period who felt that a combustible fuel could not be distilled out of the asphalt from the pitch lake. The other point of view from Capt. Darwent was that a combustible fuel, refined from oil drilled from the earth would be the ideal fuel for the future."

In either 1865, 1866, or 1867, according to different accounts, the American civil engineer, Walter Darwent, discovered and produced oil at Aripero. Efforts in 1867 to begin production by the Trinidad and Tobago Petroleum Company at La Brea and the Pariah Petroleum Company at Aripero were poorly financed and abandoned after Walter Darwent died of yellow fever.

In 1893 Randolph Rust, along with his neighbour, John Lee Lum, drilled a successful well near Darwent's original one. By early 1907 major drilling operations began, roads and other infrastructure were built. Annual production of oil in Trinidad and Tobago reached 47,000 barrels (7,500 m^{3}) by 1910 and kept rapidly increasing year by year.

Estimated oil production in Trinidad and Tobago in 2005 was about 150,000 bbl/d (24,000 m^{3}/d).

== 20th-century political development ==
Trinidad was ruled as a Crown colony with no elected representation until 1925. Although Tobago had an elected Assembly, this was dissolved prior to the union of the two islands. In 1925 the first elections to the Legislative Council were held. Seven of the thirteen members were elected, the others were nominated by the governor. The franchise was determined by income, property and residence qualifications, and was limited to men over the age of 21 and women over the age of 30. The 1946 elections were the first with universal adult suffrage.

=== Labour movement ===
Labour riots in 1937 led by T.U.B. Butler (an immigrant from the neighbouring island of Grenada) shook the country and led to the formation of the modern Trade Union movement. Butler was jailed from 1937 to 1939, but was re-arrested when the United Kingdom entered World War II and jailed for the duration of the war. After his release in 1945 Butler reorganised his political party, the British Empire Citizens' and Workers' Home Rule Party. This party won a plurality in the 1950 general elections. However, the establishment feared Butler as a radical and instead Albert Gomes became the first Chief Minister of Trinidad and Tobago.

=== Representative government ===
The 1956 general elections saw the emergence of the People's National Movement under the leadership of Eric Williams. The PNM, opposed by Dr. Rudranath Capildeo of the Democratic Labor Party and Ashford Sinanan, who later founded the West Indian National Party (WINP), continued to dominate politics in Trinidad and Tobago until 1986. The party won every general election between 1956 and 1981. Williams became prime minister at independence, and remained in that position until his death in 1981.

=== Federation ===
In 1958, the United Kingdom tried to establish an independent West Indies Federation comprising most of the former British West Indies. However, disagreement over the structure of the federation led to Jamaica's withdrawal. Eric Williams responded to this with his now famous calculation "One from ten leaves nought." Trinidad and Tobago chose not to bear the financial burden without Jamaica's assistance, and the Federation collapsed.

=== Independence ===
Trinidad and Tobago achieved full independence via the Trinidad and Tobago Independence Act 1962 on 31 August 1962 within the Commonwealth with Queen Elizabeth II as its titular head of state. On 1 August 1976, the country became a republic, and the last Governor-General, Sir Ellis Clarke, became the first President. (Note: Because Trinidad and Tobago's flag, coat of arms and national anthem did not feature monarchical symbols or symbolism, all three were left unaltered when the country became a republic.)

=== Black Power and labour unrest ===
In 1968 the National Joint Action Committee was formed by members of the Guild of Undergraduates at the St Augustine campus of the University of the West Indies, under the leadership of Geddes Granger. In 1969 it was formally launched to protest the arrest of West Indian students at Sir George Williams University in Montreal. Together with Trade Unions and other groups, this led to the birth of the Black Power movement. In 1970 a series of marches and strikes led to the declaration of a State of Emergency and the arrest of 15 Black Power leaders. In sympathy with the arrested leaders, a portion of the Trinidad and Tobago Regiment, led by Raffique Shah and Rex Lassalle mutinied and took hostages at the Teteron Barracks (located on the Chaguaramas Peninsula). However, the Coast Guard remained loyal and was able to isolate the mutineers at Teteron (as the only way out was along a narrow coastal road). After 5 days the mutineers surrendered. Political difficulties in the post-Black Power era culminated in the "No Vote" campaign of 1971 (which resulted in the PNM winning all the seats in Parliament). In 1973, in the face of a collapsing economy Eric Williams was prepared to resign as prime minister. However, the outbreak of the 1973 Arab-Israeli War led to the recovery of oil prices and Williams remained in office.

==== National Union of Freedom Fighters ====
The National Union of Freedom Fighters (NUFF) emerged in Trinidad and Tobago in the early 1970s, a period of social and political tension following the Black Power Revolution. Formed in December 1971, the group's emergence was influenced by a sense of dissatisfaction with the existing socio-political climate. Inspired by guerrilla warfare strategies, NUFF members engaged in activities such as attacks on banks, police stations, and infrastructure. These actions were part of their stated objective to challenge the government of Prime Minister Eric Williams. NUFF’s activities led to confrontations with state authorities. Security forces undertook operations to counter NUFF, resulting in casualties on both sides. Events such as the attack on a camp in Caura and the death of Beverley Jones marked key moments in the conflict. The government took measures to address the challenges posed by NUFF, and by 1974, the organization's activities had largely been suppressed.

=== Oil boom and bust ===
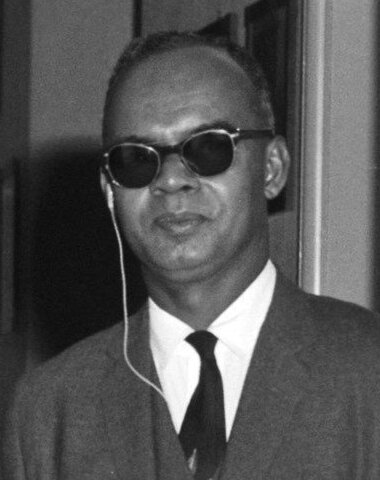
Eric Williams, the first prime minister of Trinidad and Tobago

The high oil prices of the 1970s and early 1980s led to an oil boom which resulted in a large increase in salaries, standards of living, and corruption.

In 1979, construction on the Eric Williams Plaza began. It would eventually be completed in 1986. It remained the tallest building in Trinidad and Tobago until the construction of the Nicholas Tower in 2003.

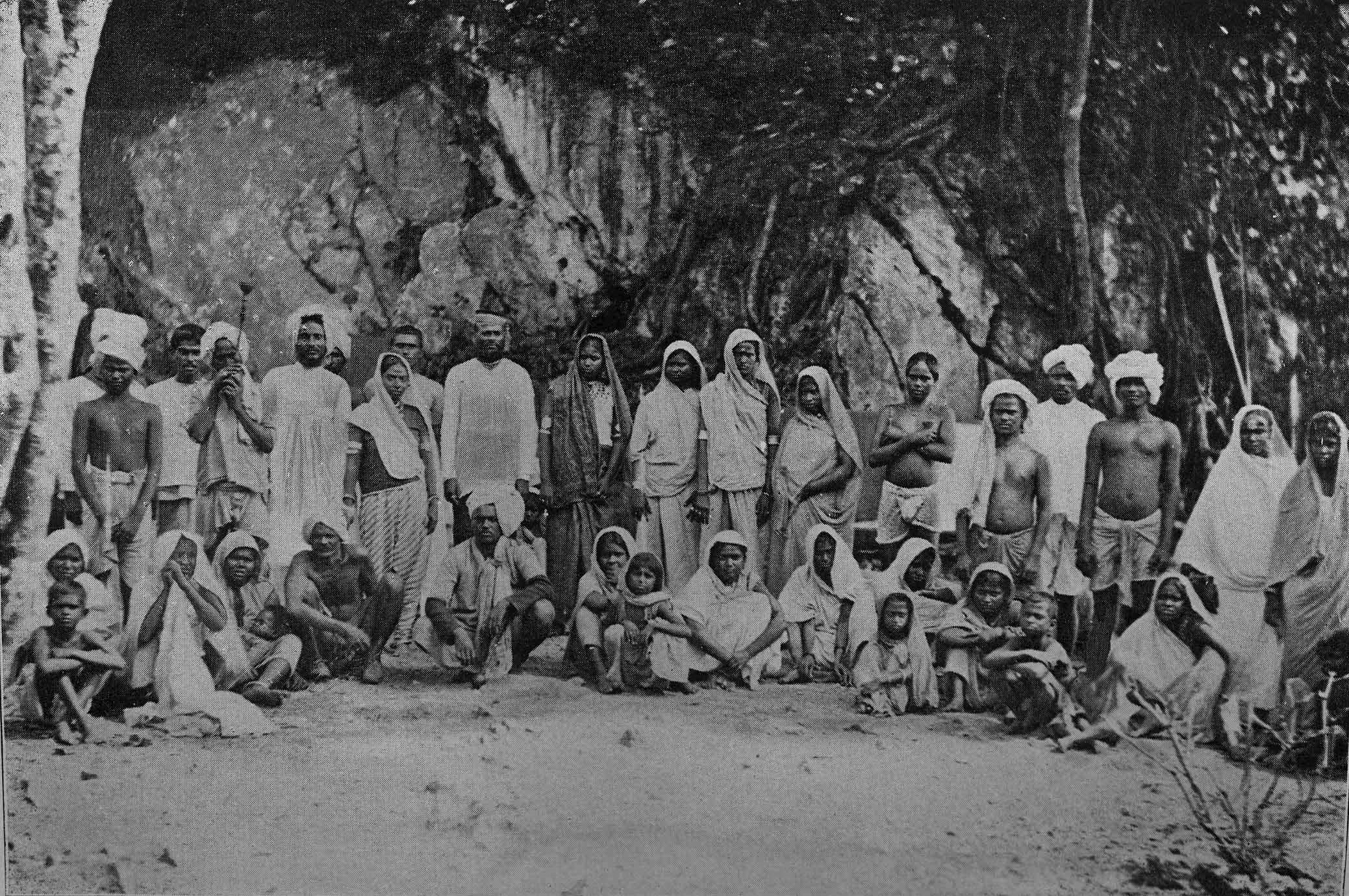
Newly arrived indentured Indians in Trinidad and Tobago

Williams died in office in 1981. The PNM remained in power following the death of Dr. Williams, but its 30-year rule ended in 1986 when the National Alliance for Reconstruction (NAR), a multi-ethnic coalition aimed at uniting Trinidadians of Afro-Trinidadian and Indo-Trinidadian descent, won a landslide victory by capturing 33 of 36 seats. Tobago's A. N. R. Robinson, the political leader of the NAR, was named prime minister. The NAR also won 11 of the 12 seats in the Tobago House of Assembly. The NAR began to break down when the Indian component withdrew in 1988. Basdeo Panday, leader of the old United Labour Front (ULF), formed the new opposition with the United National Congress (UNC). The NAR's margin was immediately reduced to 27 seats, with six for the UNC and three for the PNM.

=== 1990 Jamaat-al-Muslimeen coup attempt ===
In July 1990, the Jamaat al Muslimeen, an extremist Black Muslim group with an unresolved grievance against the government over land claims, tried to overthrow the NAR government. The group held the prime minister and members of parliament hostage for five days while rioting shook Port of Spain. After a long standoff with the police and military, the Jamaat al Muslimeen leader, Yasin Abu Bakr, and his followers surrendered to Trinidadian authorities. Having had the matter referred back to the local courts by the Privy Council with a clear indication of a view that the amnesty was valid, in July 1992, the High Court upheld the validity of a government amnesty given to the Jamaat members during the hostage crisis. Abu Bakr and 113 other Jamaat members were jailed for two years while the courts debated the amnesty's validity. All 114 members were eventually released. Subsequent to this, the UK Privy Council deemed the amnesty invalid but expressed the view that it would be improper to re-arrest the 114 accused.

=== Later developments ===
In December 1991, the NAR captured only the two districts in Tobago. The PNM, led by Patrick Manning, carried a majority of 21 seats, and the UNC came in second. Manning became the new prime minister and Basdeo Panday continued to lead the opposition. In November 1995, Manning called early elections, in which the PNM and UNC both won 17 seats and the NAR won two seats. The UNC allied with the NAR and formed the new government, with Panday becoming prime minister – the first prime minister of Indo-Trinidadian descent.

Basdeo Panday was Prime Minister of Trinidad and Tobago from 1995 to 2001. He led United National Congress (UNC) until 2010.

Elections held in December 2000 returned the UNC to power when they won 19 seats, while the opposition PNM won 16, and the NAR 1. The UNC government fell in October 2001 with the defection of three of its parliamentarians amidst allegations of corruption in the then UNC government, and the December 2001 elections resulted in an even 18 to 18 split between the UNC and the PNM. President Robinson appointed Patrick Manning Prime Minister despite the fact that the UNC won the popular vote and that Panday was the sitting prime minister. Despite the fact that Manning was unable to attract a majority (and Parliament was thus unable to sit), he delayed calling elections until October 2002. The PNM formed the next government after winning 20 seats, while the UNC won 16. Both parties are committed to free market economic policies and increased foreign investment. Trinidad and Tobago has remained cooperative with the United States in the regional fight against narcotics trafficking and on other issues.

Patrick Manning was Prime Minister of Trinidad and Tobago from 1991 to 1995 and again from 2001 to 2010. He also led People's National Movement (PNM) from 1987 to 2010.

The serious crime situation in the country has led to a severe deterioration in security conditions in the country.

On 26 May 2010, Kamla Persad-Bissessar, leader of the People's Partnership, was sworn in as the country's first female prime minister. On 21 August 2011, she asked President George Maxwell Richards to declare a limited state of emergency. On 9 September 2015, Dr. Keith Rowley was sworn in as new prime minister, following the election victory of his People's National Movement (PNM). On 19 March 2018 Trinidad's first female president, Ms. Paula-Mae Weekes, was sworn in the mainly ceremonial post. In August 2020, the governing People's National Movement won general election, meaning the incumbent prime minister Keith Rowley was going to serve a second term. In April 2025, the opposition, centrist United National Congress (UNC), won the election, meaning Kamla Persad-Bissessar became the next prime minister.

== See also ==
- Spanish colonization of the Americas
- Dutch colonization of the Americas
- Curonian colonization of the Americas
- British colonization of the Americas
- French colonization of the Americas
- History of the British West Indies
- List of governors of the Windward Islands
- List of prime ministers of Trinidad and Tobago
- West Indies Federation
- Naval Base Trinidad (1941–1977)
- Waller Air Force Base
- Carlsen Air Force Base
- National Union of Freedom Fighters

== Bibliography ==
- Carmichael, Gertrude (1961). The History of the West Indian Islands of Trinidad and Tobago, 1498–1900. Alvin Redman, London.
- Aleong, Joe Chin, and Edward B. Proud. 1997. The Postal History of Trinidad and Tobago, Heathfield, East Sussex, England: Proud-Bailey Co. Ltd, ISBN 1-872465-24-2
- de Verteuil, Anthony. 1989. Eight East Indian Immigrants: Gokool, Soodeen, Sookoo, Capildeo, Beccani, Ruknaddeen, Valiama, Bunsee ISBN 976-8054-25-5
- de Verteuil, Anthony. 1996. The Holy Ghost Fathers of Trinidad. The Litho Press, Port of Spain. ISBN 976-8136-87-1.
- Hill, Jonathan D., and Fernando Santos-Granero (eds). 2002. Comparative Arawakan Histories.
- Meighoo, Kirk. 2003. Politics in a Half Made Society: Trinidad and Tobago, 1925–2002 ISBN 1-55876-306-6
- Newson, Linda A. 1976. Aboriginal and Spanish Colonial Trinidad.
- Sawh, Gobin, Ed. 1992. The Canadian Caribbean Connection: Bridging North and South: History, Influences, Lifestyles. Carindo Cultural Assoc., Halifax.
- Stark, James H. 1897. Stark's Guide-Book and History of Trinidad including Tobago, Granada, and St. Vincent; also a trip up the Orinoco and a description of the great Venezuelan Pitch Lake. Boston: James H. Stark, publisher; London: Sampson Low, Marston & Company.
- Williams, Eric. 1964. History of the People of Trinidad and Tobago, Andre Deutsch, London.
- Williams, Eric. 1964. British Historians and the West Indies, Port of Spain.
- Naipaul, V. S. 1969. The Loss of El Dorado, Andre Deutsch, London.
