= Ivor Archie =

Trinidadian jurist

The Honourable Ivor Archie ORTT
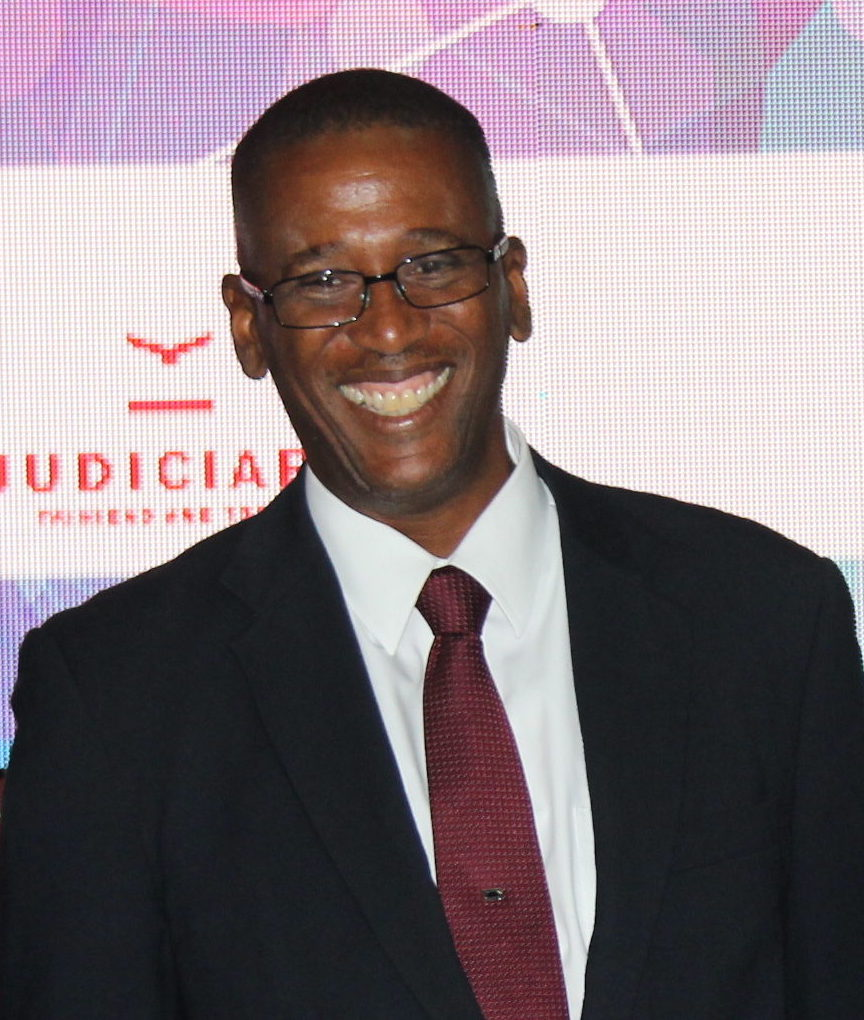
- Archie in 2019

8th Chief Justice of Trinidad and Tobago
- In office 22 November 2008 – 22 October 2025
- Prime Minister: Patrick Manning; Kamla Persad-Bissessar; Keith Rowley; Stuart Young
- Preceded by: Satnarine Sharma
- Succeeded by: Ronnie Boodoosingh

Personal details
- Born: Ivor Ainsworth Archie; 18 August 1960 (age 66) Tobago, Trinidad and Tobago
- Spouse: Denise Rodriguez‑Archie
- Children: 2
- Education: University of the West Indies, St.Augustine
- Occupation: Chief Justice
- Awards: Order of the Republic of Trinidad and Tobago (2013)

Ivor Archie ORTT (born 18 August 1960) is a Trinidadian jurist who served as Chief Justice of Trinidad and Tobago from 2008 to 2025. He was formerly Solicitor general of the Cayman Islands from 1995 until his return to Trinidad in 1998.

== Personal life ==
He was born on 18 August 1960, in Tobago. He attended Scarborough Anglican Boys’ School, Bishop’s High School, and St Mary’s College.

He is married to Denise Rodriguez-Archie and they have two children, Chinyere and Sean.

== Career ==
He graduated with a BSc in Mechanical Engineering (upper second class honours) from the University of the West Indies in 1980. He worked as an engineer at Trintoplan Consultants Limited in Trinidad and at Schlumberger in Libya.

Archie then studied law at the Solent University in Southampton, England, receiving his LLB in 1984. He received his Legal Education Certificate at Hugh Wooding Law School in St Augustine. He was admitted to the Bar of Trinidad and Tobago in 1986. Archie worked initially for Clarke and Company. He then served as State Counsel and Senior Crown Counsel for the governments of Trinidad and Tobago, the Turks and Caicos Islands and the Cayman Islands. He was Solicitor General of the Cayman Islands and acted on occasion as the Attorney General.

On 1 March 1998, he was appointed a puisine judge of the Supreme Court of Judicature. He became a Justice of Appeal on 2 April 2004, and chief justice on 24 January 2008. He is the eighth chief justice of Trinidad and Tobago and the youngest person to have taken the role. He is Chairman of the Judicial and Legal Services Commission, President of the Trinidad and Tobago Judicial Education Institute, and a fellow of the Board of the Commonwealth Judicial Education Institute. In 2013, he received the Order of the Republic of Trinidad and Tobago.

In 2018, he lost a legal battle to prevent the Law Association of Trinidad and Tobago (LATT) from investigating allegations over his "close ties" to Dillian Johnson, a gay man and convicted felon who fled Trinidad after surviving an attempted shooting. LATT conducted its investigation and voted to report Archie to the Prime Minister, who has sole authority in Trinidad and Tobago for recommending discipline and removal of judges. Prime Minister Keith Rowley declined to pursue impeachment, saying that he had been advised there was a "lack of evidence".

Archie retired as chief justice on October 22, 2025. Despite a constitutional amendment in 2020 which had changed the retirement age of the chief justice from 65 to 70, Archie indicated that it had always been his intention to retire at the age of 65.
