= Trinidad and Tobago Unified Teachers Association =

TTUTA
- Trinidad and Tobago Unified Teachers Association
- Founded: 24 October 1979
- Headquarters: Curepe, Trinidad and Tobago
- Location: Trinidad and Tobago
- Members: Approx 10,800 in 2007
- Key people: Antonia Tehka-DeFreitas, President; Kady Beckles, General Secretary
- Website: TTUTA

The Trinidad and Tobago Unified Teachers Association is a trade union in Trinidad and Tobago and is the representative organisation for teachers who are employed in the public education sector. Its membership approximates 10,800 teachers in active service and 1,200 retiree members. TTUTA's Head Office is in Curepe and it has other offices in San Fernando and Tobago with a further six District Offices.

== History ==
In 1978 teachers were represented by four unions: de Public Services Association (PSA), led by James Manswell, the Tobago Unified Teachers Association (TUTA), the Trinidad and Tobago Teachers’ Union, (TTTU), whose leader was St. Elmo Gopaul; and the Secondary School Teachers Association (SSTA) headed by Osmond Downer and which represented teachers in the so-called “prestige” schools in the country. The three Trinidad unions were all recognized by the Education Act No. 1 of 1966 as the representative unions for teachers.

Teacher dissatisfaction with representation by the four Trinidad unions had grown in the 1970s. There was the view that adversarial relations between the three units had severely hampered Industrial Relations in the Teaching Service. As early as 1966 there was a struggle between two of the three unions to be the sole representative for any class of, or classes of teachers. The Special Tribunal No. 10 of 1974, which stated that any one of the three unions could represent any class or classes of teachers decided this issue. This resulted in rapid changes of membership among teachers. However, not one of these unions emerged as the majority union.

The implications of teacher representation by four unions had several serious consequences. Any issue raised by one union with the Chief Personnel Officer (CPO) had to be discussed with each union separately. This resulted in the presentation of conflicting arguments to the CPO and his advisor's by the different unions, a situation which acted to the disadvantage of teachers. Additionally, negotiations were often lengthy with a consequently longer period for settlement. The relationship between the three unions was thus described as one involving a great deal of “inter-union rivalry and fragmentation” which was seen as “the biggest disadvantage when negotiating a collective agreement,”.

== Teacher Professionalism ==
Mr. Frank B. Seepersad, the first General Secretary of TTUTA, noted that fragmentation of the unions had caused them to pay little attention to advancing the cause of teacher professionalism. Two existing committees, the Appeals Committee and the Assessment of Qualifications Committee were not being closely monitored. The unions were paying little attention to issues, for example, like in-service training for teachers and refresher courses. Also, the unions were not pressing for much needed changes to the syllabuses of both the primary and secondary schools.

This failure to adequately address teachers’ issues resulted in irrational promotions and transfers, non-recognition of extra qualifications, and the absence of a clear policy on study leave, staff shortages and late staffing. Seepersad observed that the unions were using teachers as “pawns in a power play”, and not seriously addressing those issues which were vital to teachers professional development and to education.

== Negotiating problems ==
In 1971 the problems over negotiations continued with the PSA refusing to sit in joint negotiations with what they described as "minority unions". As a result, the salaries issue was referred to the Special Tribunal and teachers had to wait almost nine years for a settlement of this issue.

In 1974, the Special Tribunal called for joint negotiations through a joint negotiations committee but again the PSA refused to join in the process. There was an additional problem in that, in 1971, the PSA, which usually went in first in negotiations, signed a four-contract contrary to the usual procedure as three-year contracts. This contributed to an exodus of teachers from the PSA.

== Committee for the Unification of Teachers ==
As the decade came to a close, dissatisfaction came to a head in 1979 and on March 31, 1979 approximately 150 teachers gathered at the Mt. Hope Junior Secondary School, headed by Frank B Seepersad, who was a teacher there, to discuss the unsatisfactory state of the teaching profession, and the meeting adopted a resolution seeking to ensure one autonomous body for teachers. A decision was also arrived at to establish a steering Committee of 22 to oversee the formation of one union for all teachers. Volunteers were sought to serve on this committee - the Committee for the Unification of Teachers (COMFUT)

Another mass meeting of May 5, 1979 at the Mucurapo Senior Secondary School, adopted a resolution to have COMFUT seek legal advice as to how it should proceed towards its goal of establishing a “…single autonomous professional organisation of teachers, where every individual teacher has a say in policy-determining decisions of the organisation through proper representation in the management of the organisation.”

The Unification Committee drew up an action plan which included:

- Stirring up teacher participation by using several publicity techniques, bumper stickers, buttons, rallies and public meetings;
- Seeking and obtaining about 9,000 signatures to the call for a single union for teachers, and an amendment of the Education Act (Act 1 of 1966) to facilitate teacher representation by a single majority union;
- Seeking the resignation of the Officers of the existing unions so as to make room for a single union;
- Fund raising activities.

Included in the campaign was the demand for an amendment of the Education Act to ensure that one union, the majority union would be recognised as the bargaining body for teachers. Ten thousand (10,000) teachers’ signatures were needed to ensure recognition as the majority union

== Unity and recognition ==
The period from March 1979 to December 1981, when TTUTA was finally recognised by the Registration, Recognition and Certification Board, was one of relentless struggle with the authorities in support of the cause for one union for all teachers. Thousands of teachers marched around the Red House and through the streets demanding that there be one umbrella body for all teachers.

On April 24, 1980 TTUTA was registered as a Trade Union. It is worth noting that TTUTA got its name from adding the word 'Trinidad' to the 'Tobago Unified Teachers Association' thus resulting in the Trinidad and Tobago Unified Teachers Association. In March 1981, the state presented a draft revision of the Education Act 1966, which allowed TTUTA to be recognised as a union for teachers, alongside the three other teachers unions in the country.

This proposal was strongly rejected at a mass meeting of members of the Association in March 1981. Under continued pressure from the mass of teachers the government conceded and the Education Act 1966 was amended to give TTUTA full recognition as the majority union for teachers. The Registration, Recognition and Certification Board accorded official recognition of the Association in December 1981.

== Affiliations ==
TTUTA is affiliated to Caribbean Union of Teachers (CUT) and the Education International (EI), the International federation of teacher associations and trade unions. The Union was affiliated to NATUC until the split which resulted in the formation of FITUN. It is not currently affiliated to any national trade union centre.

== Associate Members ==
Members of the following organisations are associate members of TTUTA:

- National Primary Schools’ Principals Association (NAPSPA)
- Association of Principals of Public Secondary Schools (APPSS)
- Agriculture Science Teachers’ Association (AGRISTA)
- Geography Association of Trinidad and Tobago.

== See also ==
- List of trade unions
