= Sister Vision Press =

Defunct Canadian publisher for women of colour

- Status: Defunct (2001)
- Founded: 1985
- Founder: Makeda Silvera and Stephanie Martin
- Country of origin: Canada
- Headquarters location: Toronto
- Publication types: Books
- Nonfiction topics: Feminism

Sister Vision Press was a Canadian small press publisher that operated from 1985 to 2001, and was the first press in Canada whose mission was to publish writing by and for Black women and women of colour.

== History ==
In 1985, writer Makeda Silvera and her partner, visual artist Stephanie Martin, co-founded Sister Vision Press with Martin as the production manager and Silvera as the managing editor.

Silvera had struggled to have her book Silenced: Talks with Working-Class Caribbean Women about Their Lives and Struggles as Domestic Workers in Canada published by both mainstream and alternative publishers, such as Women's Press (Toronto). Editors often referenced that their language was inaccessible and too difficult to understand and that there was no market for such a book. Williams-Wallace Publishers, which was considered a Third World press, published Silenced in 1983 and, in 1986, Sister Vision Press republished Silenced in 1989. Silenced stemmed from Silvera's reporting and organizing around the Seven Jamaican Mothers case in 1978. In that year, Canada's Manpower and Immigration Ministry began deportation orders for seven Jamaican women who had falsified information on their application by denying that they had minor-aged children. These mothers argued that they were advised by the Jamaican government not to declare their children on their documents.

This rejection fueled Silvera and Martin's commitment to starting their own press "for Black women and women of colour, one that addressed working-class issues and concerns, that addressed sexuality and language with an emphasis on Creole."Creole played an important role in Sister Vision Press's commitment to representing the voices and experiences of Caribbean women. They prioritized preserving language diversity rather than exclude writing because it didn't match the usual English vocabulary and letter system. For example, Creation Fire: A CAFRA Anthology of Caribbean Women Poets(1990), produced with the Caribbean Association for Feminist Research and Action, included poetry written in several Caribbean languages, including English, French, Creole, Papiamento, and Dutch. This created a way for Caribbean women's literary expression across different languages and cultures.included having little to no funding, a lack of public support and awareness for a publishing company for women of colour, and hesitation from the black literary community to stand behind a black lesbian couple. Some of their inspirations were Marie-Joseph Angélique, a Montreal slave who spearheaded the first rebellion against slavery in Canada, and Mary Ann Shadd, the first black Canadian female editor and publisher of The Provincial Freeman, "one of Canada's earliest Black newspapers" in the 1850s. Silvera and Martin's goals through the Sister Vision Press were to bring awareness about the links "between women and colour in Canada and in the Caribbean and Third World women the world over".

== Editorial focus ==
Sister Vision Press focused on works that included oral histories of "ordinary women often omitted from traditional history and contemporary writing", books for children and young adults, and lastly works of theory and research that "oppose the negation of women of colour's voices in Canadian feminist theory and movements".

Much of their success was in publishing anthologies such as Piece of My Heart: A Lesbian of Colour Anthology, which was a finalist in the American Library Association Gay and Lesbian Book Award for 1992. Memories Have Tongue, a 1992 book by Afua Cooper, was one of the finalists in the 1992 Casa de las Americas literary award.

After its establishment, Sister Vision Press collaborated with feminist women's organizations in the Caribbean, Britain, Southern Africa, India and North America. One of these partnerships was with CAFRA (Caribbean Association for Feminist Research and Action) of Trinidad and Tobago and it resulted in the publishing of Creation Fire: A CAFRA Anthology of Caribbean Women Poets (1990), edited by Ramabai Espinet. Silvera also sought out other writers, noting: "A lot of writers that we encountered just didn't have the confidence to put out their work or to see their names in print. As the managing editor, I took on the role of mentoring many writers, particularly first-timers, through community centres, through word of mouth, and by offering workshops."

== Partial list of books published ==
- Speshal rikwes [Poems in Dialect], Ahdri Zhina Mandiela (1985)
- Lionheart Gal: Life Stories of Jamaican Women, ed. Sistren Theatre Collective and Honor Ford-Smith (1986)
- Blaze a Fire: Significant Contributions of Caribbean Women, ed. Nesha Hanif (1988)
- Creation Fire: A CAFRA Anthology of Caribbean Women Poets, ed. Ramabai Espinet (1990)
- Piece of My Heart: A Lesbian of Colour Anthology, ed. Makeda Silvera (1991)
- Memories Have Tongue, Afua Cooper (1992)
- Returning the Gaze : Essays on Racism, Feminism and Politics, ed. Himani Bannerji (1993)
- Ladies of the Night and Other Stories, Althea Prince (1993)
- Miscegenation Blues: Voices of Mixed Race Women, ed. Carol Camper (1994)
- The Very Inside: An Anthology of Writings by Asian and Pacific Island Lesbians and Bisexual Women, ed. Sharon Lim-Hing (1994)
- Onkwehonwe-neha: "Our Ways", Sylvia Maracle (1994)
- Dread Culture : A Rastawoman's Story, Masanie Montague (1994)
- Black Girl Talk, ed. the Black Girls (1995)
- Brown Girl in the Ring : Rosemary Brown : a biography for young people, Lynette Roy (1992)
