= Ramabai Espinet =

- Born: 1948 (age 76–77); San Fernando, Trinidad and Tobago
- Occupation: writer

Ramabai Espinet (born 1948) is an Indo-Trinidadian poet, novelist, essayist, and critic from Trinidad and Tobago. Espinet was born in San Fernando, Trinidad and Tobago. She attended York University in Toronto, Canada before earning a Ph.D. at the University of the West Indies, St. Augustine, Trinidad. She currently teaches English at Seneca College. Her writings on Euro-Creole women are influenced by works by Jean Rhys and Phyllis Shand Allfrey. Most of Espinet's works relate to her Indo-Caribbean heritage. Sister Vision Press published her first four works in Toronto, Canada.

== Influence ==
Espinet has stated that she desires to illustrate the experiences of Indo-Caribbeans and highlight the effects of alcoholism and abuse on West Indian women. West Indians have said that the book The Swinging Bridge gives them values, articulates their experiences, and contains "language for the healing". Although Espinet talks specifically about San Fernandians, Indo-Caribbeans have noted that the book is universal and important because it tells the stories of their youth and represents their experiences for the larger society.

== Works about Espinet ==
- "Trini-Canadian author launches debut novel Race and passion in Swinging Bridge," by Marcia Henville in Caribbean Voice, 13 March 2005.
- "The Swinging Bridge," reviewed by Patricia Clark in College Quarterly 7.1 (2004).
- Coming Home (CaribbeanTales, 2006). A one-hour film-documentary that follows Ramabai Espinet as she returns to her hometown of San Fernando, Trinidad, in order to launch her novel The Swinging Bridge. What begins as a simple nostalgic journey becomes a fascinating exploration of a brilliant writer's imagination.

== Reception ==
From her book The Swinging Bridge, Ramabai Espinet is said to have created the "kala pani poetics." The “kala pani poetics” is meaningful for two reasons: it transforms the marginalized widows in India into more autonomous members of society with mobility and it places an emphasis on the "mother history" of a scattered Indian lineage (Mehta 20).

== Bibliography ==
- Nuclear Seasons (1991)
- Beyond the Kalapani
- Indian Robber Talk
- Creation Fire: A CAFRA Reading Anthology of Caribbean Women's Poetry (as editor)
- "Barred: Trinidad 1987"
- The Swinging Bridge (2003)
  - Shortlisted for the 2004 Commonwealth Writers' Prize, category of Best First Book (Caribbean and Canada Region); longlisted for the 2005 International Dublin Literary Award; and selected for the Robert Adams lecture series 2005.
- Indian Cuisine (1994)
- The Princess of Spadina (1992)
- Ninja's Carnival (1993)
