= Peggy Antrobus =

Feminist activist, author, and scholar (born 1935)

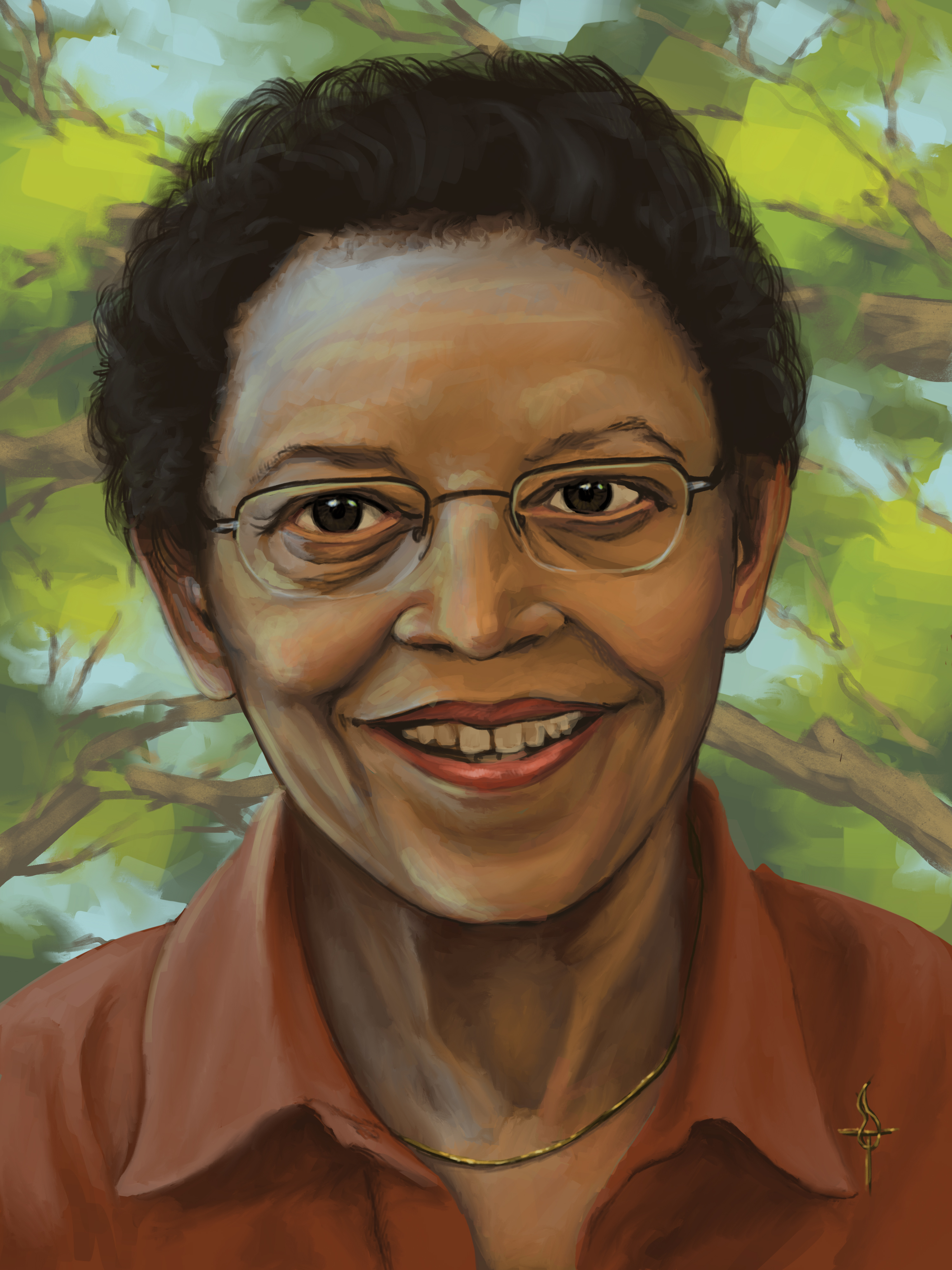
- Antrobus (digital painting)
- Born: Grenada
- Occupations: Feminist activist, author, scholar, United Nations advisor
- Known for: Founding member of Caribbean feminist organizations

Peggy Antrobus (born 1935) is a feminist activist, author, and scholar from the Caribbean. She served as Advisor on Women's Affairs to the government of Jamaica, and as United Nations advisor to the Barbados Ministry of Social Transformation. She is a founder member of several feminist organisations, including the Caribbean Association for Feminist Research and Action (CAFRA), the global South feminist network Development Alternatives with Women for a New Era (DAWN), and the International Gender and Trade Network (IGTN). She is the author of The Global Women's Movement: Origins, Issues and Strategies (Zed Books, 2004).

== Childhood and education ==
Antrobus was born in Grenada in 1935. She studied in St. Lucia at St. Joseph's Convent and later at the St. Vincent Girl's High School. She did her bachelor's in economics at Bristol University in 1954, and went on to receive a professional certificate in social work at the University of Birmingham, United Kingdom. She completed her doctorate in education at the University of Massachusetts, Amherst in 1998.

== Career ==
Antrobus was appointed the advisor on Women's Affairs to the government of Jamaica in 1974. According to Michelle Rowley, associate professor of women's studies at the University of Maryland, this was the beginning of Antrobus' feminist consciousness. In 1987, she set up the Women and Development Unit (WAND) at the University of the West Indies (UWI) and was its head until she retired in 1995.

With other Caribbean activists, artists, and scholars like Honor Ford-Smith, Sonia Cuales, Cynthia Ellis, Joan French, Rhoda Reddock, and Rawwida Baksh-Soodeen, Antrobus set up the Caribbean Association for Feminist Research and Action (CAFRA), in 1985. She was also a founder member of Development Alternatives for Women in a New Era (DAWN) and functioned as the organization's general coordinator for the from 1990 to 1996.

With many other leading feminists and women's rights activists of the time, Peggy Antrobus was deeply involved in the UN World Conferences on Women, including the first at Mexico City in 1975. US feminist and author Charlotte Bunch, quotes Antrobus as saying, about this inaugural international gathering of women: "It was within this context that women from around the world first encountered each other in a sustained and ever-deepening process....[that] was to nurture and expand this movement in a way that not even its strongest protagonists could have imagined."

== Writing ==
Peggy Antrobus authored an analytical and historical overview of global feminism and the international women's movement in her book, The Global Women's Movement: Origins, Issues and Strategies (Zed Books, 2004). She contributed an essay to Robin Morgan's anthology, Sisterhood is Global: The International Women's Movement Anthology (Anchor Press/Doubleday, 1984).
