= Gita Sen =

Indian economist

- Born: 30 October 1948 (age 77); India

Academic background
- Education: Delhi School of Economics, M.A. Stanford University, Ph.D.

Academic work
- Institutions: Harvard T.H. Chan School of Public Health
- Main interests: Feminism, reproductive rights

Gita Sen is an Indian feminist scholar. She is a Distinguished Professor & Director at the Ramalingaswami Centre on Equity & Social Determinants of Health, at the Public Health Foundation of India. She is also an adjunct professor at Harvard University, a professor emeritus at the Indian Institute of Management Bangalore, and the General Coordinator of DAWN (Development Alternatives with Women for a New Era).

== Education ==
Sen received her M.A. in economics from Delhi School of Economics and her Ph.D. in economics from Stanford University. She holds honorary doctorates from the University of East Anglia, the Karolinska Institute, the Open University, and the University of Sussex.

== Career ==
Sen was the first chairperson of the World Bank's External Gender Consultative Group and was a member on the Millennium Project's Task-force on Gender Equality.

Sen has worked with the United Nations in several capacities, including as the lead consultant for the United Nations Population Fund's 2003–2007 India Population Assessment. She also serves on the Scientific and Technical Advisory group for the World Health Organization's Department of Reproductive Health and Research.

Currently, Sen is an adjunct professor of Global Health and Population at the Harvard T.H. Chan School of Public Health and a professor emeritus at the Indian Institute of Management Bangalore. In 2020 she was honored with the Dan David Prize.

== Selected bibliography ==
=== Books ===
- Gender Equity in Health: the Shifting Frontiers of Evidence and Action (Routledge, 2010).
- Women's Empowerment and Demographic Processes – Moving Beyond Cairo (Oxford University Press/IUSSP, 2000).
- Population Policies Reconsidered: Health, Empowerment and Rights (Harvard University Press, 1994).

=== Journal articles ===
- Sen, Gita; Benería, Lourdes (Spring 1982). "Class and Gender Inequalities and Women's Role in Economic Development: Theoretical and Practical Implications". Feminist Studies. 8 (1). Feminist Studies: 157–176. doi:10.2307/3177584. JSTOR 3177584.

== See also ==
- Population study
- Peggy Antrobus
- Lourdes Benería
- Feminism in India
