= Swinging Bridge =

Swinging Bridge may refer to:

- A simple suspension bridge
- Swing bridge, a movable bridge that pivots horizontally
- The Swinging Bridge, a novel by Ramabai Espinet, published in 2003
- Riverside Swinging Bridge in Riverside, Texas, listed on the NRHP
- Androscoggin Swinging Bridge in southern Maine
- Patapsco Swinging Bridge in Patapsco Valley State Park, Maryland
- Zinc Swinging Bridge in Zinc, Arkansas, listed on the NRHP
- Regency Bridge near Regency, Texas
- Swinging Bridge, a bridge in Yosemite Valley and popular tourist destination
- Kootenai Falls Swinging Bridge in Lincoln County, Montana

== See also ==
- Swing Bridge (disambiguation)
