= Neuma Aguiar =

Brazilian sociologist (1938–2023)

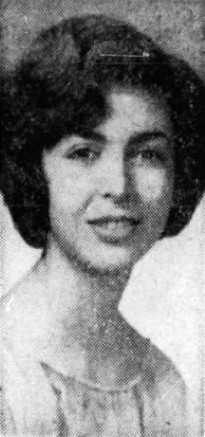
- Aguiar in 1963
- Born: Neuma Figueiredo de Aguiar; 11 September 1938; Fortaleza, Ceará, Brazil
- Died: 1 October 2023 (aged 85)
- Other name: Neuma Aguiar Walker
- Occupations: Sociologist, women's studies scholar

Neuma Figueiredo Aguiar (11 September 1938–1 October 2023) was a Brazilian sociologist and one of the women who introduced women's studies in the country. After earning her undergraduate degree at the Pontifical Catholic University of Rio de Janeiro in 1960, she completed a master's degree in sociology and anthropology at Boston University and a PhD at Washington University in St. Louis, Missouri. Returning to Brazil, from 1972 to 1996 she worked at the Instituto Universitário de Pesquisas do Rio de Janeiro, the research institute of the Universidade Candido Mendes. From 1978, she taught a women's study course at the institute, which mainly focused on women's impact on the economy. Between 1996 and 2008, she was a full professor at the Federal University of Minas Gerais, both teaching women's studies and directing the Center for Quantitative Research in Social Sciences.

Aguiar was a founding member of the transnational feminist network, Development Alternatives with Women for a New Era (DAWN) and served as its highest officer from 1986 to 1990. She was granted an honorary doctorate in 2003, from the University of Wisconsin–Madison and in 2007 was awarded both the Vinícius Caldeira Brant Prize from the Federal University of Minas Gerais and the Florestan Fernandes Prize of the Brazilian Society of Sociology. Along with other feminist pioneers, she was honored with the Rose Marie Muraro Prize by the federal Secretariat for Women's Policies and the National Council for Scientific and Technological Development in 2014.

== Early life and education ==
Neuma Figueiredo de Aguiar was born on 11 September 1938, in Fortaleza, in the State of Ceará, Brazil, to Emilia "Lili" (née Figueiredo) and Ilkens Almeida de Aguiar. Her father was an employee of the Banco do Brasil. Aguiar completed a degree in history from the Pontifical Catholic University of Rio de Janeiro in 1960, and then went abroad to further her education, after winning a scholarship from the General Federation of Women's Clubs. She earned a master's degree in sociology and anthropology at Boston University in 1962, and was awarded the Pan-American Fellowship of the Organization of American States, to pursue graduate studies at Washington University in St. Louis. In 1963, Aguiar married Roger Walker, a sociologist from Oxford, England who had recently completed a PhD in sociology at Harvard University. The period that she was studying in the United States was an era marked by social unrest and worldwide campaigns by activists against power structures that seemed unable to respond to the citizens' wants and their demands for change. Martin Luther King Jr. and Robert F. Kennedy were both assassinated in 1968 and activists were dissatisfied with inequalities in civil rights, women's rights, and worker's rights, and on-going polarization caused by the Cold War and conflict, such as the Vietnam War. There were intense anti-racism rallies and the beginnings of feminist debate groups at the University of Washington during Aguiar's tenure. She completed her PhD in sociology at Washington University in 1969.

== Career ==
Returning to Brazil, Aguiar first worked as an assistant professor at the Fluminense Federal University, at the National Museum of Brazil, and then the Pontifical Catholic University of Rio de Janeiro, before being hired in 1972 to work at the Instituto Universitário de Pesquisas do Rio de Janeiro, the research institute of the Universidade Candido Mendes. Her research focus was primarily on the gendered divisions of labor. In 1978, Aguiar began offering the women's studies seminar, "A Mulher na Força de Trabalho na América Latina" ("Women in the Workforce in Latin America"), which evaluated both women's workplace activities and the challenges working women encountered. At the time, few universities in Latin America were analyzing women's socio-economic status. Of particular interest to Aguiar were unpaid domestic services women performed and how those contributed to the national economy. For example, she analyzed census reports for 1970 and 1980 and discovered that at the beginning of the decade, only 18.5 percent of the total paid workforce were women, but by the end of the period women comprised 26.9 percent of paid workers. Her study also showed that a shift had occurred and women were no longer leaving the workforce to marry and have children, but instead the majority of women with families continued to work.

Aguiar cultivated a large network of other academics who were researching women, such as Brazilian researcher Elisabeth Souza Lobo and Indian sociologist Chandra Talpade Mohanty. Aguiar was named a Tinker Professor of Sociology and Rural Sociology at the University of Wisconsin–Madison (UW–Madison) in 1981, and delivered the lecture "The Beginning of Women's Studies in Brazil", for the women's studies program at UW–Madison. She returned as a visiting professor at UW–Madison for women's studies in the 1983–1984 school term. In 1984, Aguiar became one of the founding members of the transnational feminist network, Development Alternatives with Women for a New Era (DAWN). The network was created as a platform to promote feminist research and analysis, as well as global activism on socio-politico-economic issues which impacted women, particularly those in the Global South. Aguiar served as the general coordinator, the highest post in the organization, from 1986 to 1990. As coordinator, she worked on initiatives aimed at addressing imbalances in the conditions which impact peoples' lives. Aguiar was hired as a full professor at the Federal University of Minas Gerais in 1996. She founded the Centro de Pesquisas Quantitativas em Ciências Sociais (Center for Quantitative Research in Social Sciences) at the university and led its methodology directive for a decade. Her research continued to examine the impact of gender on time use, social stratification and social mobility, and in particular, she focused on evaluating the roles women play in emerging, contemporary economies. She also analyzed gender and patriarchy, as well as women's movements, combining ethnographic, historical, and statistical data in an interdisciplinary approach, which became a model for other scholars.

Aguiar received an honorary doctorate in 2003, from UW–Madison, in recognition of her "preeminence in the study of women's work in Brazil". She was awarded the Vinícius Caldeira Brant Prize from the Federal University of Minas Gerais, as well as the Florestan Fernandes Prize of the Brazilian Society of Sociology in 2007, in recognition of her scientific contribution to the development of gender and women's studies in Brazil. Aguiar retired in 2008 and was named a professor emeritus the following year. In 2014, she was honored along with Lenira Maria de Carvalho, Clara Charf, Herilda Balduino de Sousa, Mireya Suárez, and Moema Libera Viezzer with the Rose Marie Muraro Prize by the federal Secretariat for Women's Policies and the National Council for Scientific and Technological Development. Each of the women were also awarded R$50,000 in recognition of their contributions in various fields to develop gender equality in Brazil.

== Death and legacy ==
Aguiar died on 30 September, or 1 October 2023. She was memorialized as a pioneer in women's studies for Brazil. Her biographer, Gabriela de Brito Caruso, credited Aguiar with laying the foundations and institutional framework to develop women's studies in the country. She praised Aguiar for the quality of her research, which was enhanced by her researching partnerships with academics from a broad spectrum of scholarly institutions. These networks allowed her to study not only Brazilian women and their impact on work and the Brazilian economy, but the various impacts that industrialization had on women's lives in both developed and developing countries using transnational data.

== Selected works ==
- Aguiar, Neuma (1979). The Structure of Brazilian Development. New Brunswick, New Jersey: Transaction Books. ISBN 978-0-87855-138-5.
- Aguiar, Neuma (1980). Tempo de transformação no Nordeste [Time of Transformation in the Northeast] (in Portuguese). Petrópolis, Brazil: Editora Vozes. OCLC 7297221.
- Aguiar, Neuma (1984). Mulheres na força de trabalho na América Latina: análises qualitativas [Women in the Workforce in Latin America: Qualitative Analyses] (in Portuguese). Petrópolis, Brazil: Editora Vozes. OCLC 12281581.
- Aguiar, Neuma; Neves, Jorge A.; Fernandes, Danielle (2007). "Mobilidade Social Feminina [Women's Social Mobility]". In Aguiar, Neuma (ed.). Desigualdades sociais, redes de sociabilidade e participação política [Social Inequalities, Sociability Networks and Political Participation] (in Portuguese). Belo Horizonte, Brazil: Editora UFMG. pp. 165–180. ISBN 978-85-7041-610-0.
- Aguiar, Neuma; Mont'Alvão, Arnaldo (April–June 2017). "Estratificação residencial, valoração do trabalho doméstico e uso do tempo: contribuições para a análise do caso Brasil" [Residential Stratification, Valuation of Domestic Work and Use of Time: Contributions for Analysis of the Case of Brazil]. Dados: Revista de Ciências Sociais (in Portuguese). 60 (2). Rio de Janeiro, Brazil: Instituto Universitário de Pesquisas do Rio de Janeiro: 331–357. doi:10.1590/001152582017122. ISSN 1678-4588. OCLC 8539592564.
