= San Fernando East =

- Constituency for the Parliament of Trinidad and Tobago
- Electorate: 23,554 (2015)
- Major settlements: San Fernando

Current constituency
- Created: 1956
- Number of members: 1
- Member of Parliament: Brian Manning (PNM)
- Created from: San Fernando

San Fernando East is a parliamentary electoral district in the city of San Fernando, Trinidad and Tobago.

San Fernando East consists of the eastern part of the city of San Fernando. It came into effect in time for the 1956 Trinidad and Tobago general election.

== Members of Parliament ==
This constituency has elected the following members of the House of Representatives of Trinidad and Tobago:

Election	Years	Member	Party	Notes
1956	24 September 1956–13 September 1976	Albert Gerard Montano	PNM	
1976	13 September 1976–7 September 2015	Patrick Manning	PNM	
2015	7 September 2015–10 August 2020	Randall Mitchell	PNM	
2020	10 August 2020-present	Brian Manning	PNM	

== Election results ==
=== Elections in the 2020s ===
2025 Trinidad and Tobago general election: San Fernando East
Party	Candidate	Votes	%	±%
PNM	Brian Manning	7,026	50.5%	▼
UNC	John Michael Alibocas	6,357	45.7%	▲
PF	Kenrick Serrette	490	3.5%	Steady
Majority		669	4.8%	
Turnout		13,909	54.19%	
Registered electors		25,667		
PNM hold				

General election 2020: San Fernando East
Party	Candidate	Votes	%	±%
PNM	Brian Manning			
UNC	Monifa Andrews			
Majority				
Turnout				

=== Elections in the 2010s ===
General election 2015: San Fernando East
Party	Candidate	Votes	%	±%
PNM	Randall Mitchell	11,689	68.13	
COP	Ashaki Scott	5,284	30.80	
ILP	Ricardo Lee Sing	183	1.07	
Majority		6,405	37.33	
Turnout		17,196	68.9	−0.8
PNM hold		Swing		
