= Nelcia Robinson-Hazell =

- Born: Nelcia Marshall
- Other names: Nelcia Marshall Robinson, Nelcia Marshall Hazell, Nelcia Hazell, Nelcia Robinson
- Occupations: community organizer and activist

Nelcia Robinson-Hazell (also known as Nelcia Marshall-Robinson and Nelcia Robinson) is a Black Carib poet, community organizer and activist. She has spearheaded the development of policy initiatives throughout the Caribbean on issues regarding gender and indigenous identity. Serving as the president of the National Council of Women of Saint Vincent and the Grenadines, she began in the 1980s to change the organization toward political action. Recognizing a need to establish research on the needs of women, she was involved in the creation of both local and regional organizations to analyze and develop information about the socio-economic and political inequalities women faced. She created similar initiatives for indigenous peoples, beginning first in Saint Vincent and then expanding them regionally. Robinson has been involved in international directives including the World Summit for Social Development and the 1995 World Conference on Women, as well as follow-up conferences discussing such issues as poverty, economic empowerment and violence against women. She has served as a civil society representative on the Regional Judicial and Legal Services Commissions and as chair of the Commonwealth Women's Network.

== Early life ==
Nelcia Marshall was born in Greggs Village in the central part of the Windward Islands on Saint Vincent in the British West Indies. Her heritage is Black Carib, as her ancestors were given amnesty to remain in St. Vincent when the Garifuna were expelled from the island. The ethnic group, which is a mixed heritage of West African, Arawak, and Island Carib, is considered the genetic parent of the Garifuna people, but differ in that Black Caribs have higher concentrations of indigenous genes, whereas Garifuna have higher African markers. Marshall grew up in Questelles, where she attended Questelles Primary School. After completing her secondary education, she earned a Bachelor of Science in Human Services at Springfield College, in Springfield, Massachusetts. She went on to study international development as a Kellogg Fellow.

== Career ==
In 1983, Marshall-Robinson was elected president of the National Council of Women. Under her leadership, the organization shifted from a traditional women's organization dealing with social issues toward an activist agency seeking political change. Because the National Council of Women was a government umbrella entity, political changes were reflected by inconsistent approach to women's concerns. To counter-balance the whims of different administrations, Robinson and others established the Committee for the Development of Women in 1984 to conduct research on women's issues. She served as the Committee's coordinator. Robinson ran as a candidate for the United Progressive Movement (UPM) party in the island's elections for the House of Assembly in 1984. In 1985, she became a founding member of the Caribbean Association for Feminist Research and Action (CAFRA), an organization aimed at analyzing and documenting the socio-economic and political inequalities facing women in the region, as a means upon which to base corrective political actions.

In 1987, Robinson became coordinator of the Caribbean Association of Indigenous People. Two years previously, in response to the sale of land in the traditional Carib homelands to a Danish development company, she had worked to organize indigenous Carib community members to enable them to leverage their collective bargaining abilities with the government. The community formed the Campaign for the Development of the Carib Community and their pressure on the government, led to the nationalization of the property. Through continued outreach, Robinson has worked to reestablish ties between the Black Carib community of Saint Vincent and the Garifuna populations in Belize and other Central American countries, through cultural heritage programs. She has published five collections of poetry and a poetry award in St. Vincent bears her name.

In 1995, Robinson attended the World Summit for Social Development in Copenhagen, participating in a hunger strike by women from developing nations to bring attention to the need for assistance to eliminate poverty and for debt relief from developed nations. Her concerns were that small island nations in the Caribbean due to size and environmental factors were vulnerable under existing trade policies and that the vulnerability adversely impacted women to a greater extent, because women were often "viewed as a source of cheap exploitable labour". She subsequently assisted in the planning events for the 1995 World Conference on Women held in Beijing and the follow-up conferences held in 2005 and 2010.

Robinson served as the coordinator of CAFRA from 1996 to 2009. In 2003, she was appointed to serve as a civil society representative on the Regional Judicial and Legal Services Commissions (RJLSC), which with the establishment of the Caribbean Court of Justice was created to propose and recommend judicial candidates to ensure that the judiciary remains independent of political influence. In 2009, Robinson-Hazell became a Goodwill Ambassador, and was granted a diplomatic passport, by the cabinet of Prime Minister Ralph Gonsalves.

Hazell has been involved in numerous endeavors to improve vulnerable populations including serving on the executive of the National Youth Council, as the coordinator for Serving Housebound and Retired Elderly (SHARE), president of the Association of Social Workers and on a regional level has served as the national representative for the Caribbean Network for Integrated Rural Development (CNIRD) and as the Caribbean Gender and Trade Network's coordinator since 1999. In 2012, she passed the presidency of the National Council of Women of SVG to Anesta Rodney. In 2013, she was the chair of the Commonwealth Women's Network, an organization which works to secure economic empowerment and gender equality, as well as alleviate violence against women.
