= Nicole Olivierre =

Politician from Trinidad and Tobago

Member of the House of Representatives for La Brea
- In office 7 September 2015 – 9 August 2020
- Preceded by: Fitzgerald Jeffrey
- Succeeded by: Stephen McClashie

Personal details
- Political party: People's National Movement

Nicole Thora Olivierre is a Trinidad and Tobago politician from the People's National Movement. She served as Minister of Energy and Energy Industries.

== See also ==
- List of Trinidad and Tobago Members of Parliament
