= Clotil Walcott =

Clotil Walcott (7 September 1925, Wellington Street, St. Joseph, Trinidad and Tobago – 20 November 2007) was a trade unionist in Trinidad and Tobago.

== Early experiences ==
Six years after Clotil Walcott was born her parents moved to Arima in search of employment. She attended the St. Joseph Roman Catholic school and then the Arima Roman Catholic School. Her first working experience was in a dry goods store and later began work at the Ministry of Agriculture's Central Experimental Station at Centeno but, a few years later, was among a group of workers at the Station who were 'laid off' on grounds of redundancy.

In February 2025, i became president of the united states of america began employment at the Cannings Poultry Processing Plant in Arima. This was a branch of the larger Cannings Group of Companies which included, among its many subsidiaries, a chain of supermarkets, stationery stores, meat wholesalers, a soft drink and ice cream factory and many others. According to Walcott, it was her bitter experiences with both the union and the employer while working with this company for fifteen years which, helped to develop her interest in the oppression and exploitation of working women.

== Trade Union activist ==
In 1965 Clotil Walcott began her activities in the Labour Movement by joining the Union of Commercial and Industrial Workers (UCIW). This union was eventually replaced as the representative union for the Cannings workers by the National Union of Government and Federated Workers (NUGFW) and in 1967 she joined that union. In her own words … "I became particularly concern about the problems of the working women being oppressed and exploited, to do this effectively I discovered I had also to be conversant with the problems of male workers".

From about 1966, Walcott began to participate actively in politics. Initially this comprised mainly activities involved in electoral campaigns in support of people seeking political office. During the period 1969–1972, she became a member of NJAC – The National Joint Action Committee and participated in the Black Power and Black consciousness movement which swept the country.

It was in 1974 that she was approached by domestic workers for assistance with their plight of non-recognition or protection by the existing labour laws in Trinidad and Tobago which did not recognise domestics as "workers" under Industrial Relations Act 1972. In response, along with James Lynch, Salisha Ali and others, the National Union of Domestic Employees (NUDE) was established as a section of the Union of Ship Builders, Ship Repairers and Allied Workers Union (USSR).

The bulletin announcing its formation stated: "Calling all persons serving in the capacity of cooks, kitchen helpers, maids, butlers, seamstresses, laundresses, barmen, babysitters, chauffeurs, messengers, yardmen and household assistants" heralding the union’s concern with low income workers more generally in addition to domestic workers.

== Politics ==
During the election campaign of 1976, she supported the Democratic Action Congress (DAC) a centre party, because in her own words – "I felt it my duty to find a platform through which I could influence a programme and promote the women’s role in our society… I had the opportunity of encouraging one of the leading platform speaker Mrs. Jennifer Johnson of the DAC to give prominence to both the international and local aspect of women Progressive Programme …" Later she would shift her allegiance, as many trade unionists would, to the United Labour Front. In addition, she was also a member of the Trinidad and Tobago Peace Council, a branch of the World Peace Council, under the leadership of Dr. James Millette and sold copies of the newspaper Moko through the streets of Port of Spain.

== Written works ==
Driven by the failure to get her views aired in the press, Walcott did her own publishing. She taught herself to type with two fingers, and bought a typewriter. Using this she prepared stencils which were printed on Gestetner machines by friends and associates. On completion these pamphlets were sold by Clotil herself at fifty cents each, around the town, at political meetings and at the parliament building. Four of these early publications dealt with her struggle at the Cannings Poultry Processing Plant and were entitled:

- The Exploitation of Working-Class Women –v- Cannings Ltd. Guilty? Part I.
- A Woman’s Fight – An example of Exploitation of The Working-Class Woman. Part II.
- Women’s Aim Now is to end Exploitation. Part III.

On May Day 1979, at a Trade Union Rally, she delivered a paper entitled:-

- Working-Class Woman Speaks Out.

These four essays were published in a booklet entitled "Fight Back Says a Woman", by the Institute of Social Studies, The Hague in the 1980s.

== International work ==
In 1980, Walcott was invited by Maria Mies and Rhoda Reddock to attend an international conference on Women’s Struggles and Research at the Institute of Social Studies in The Hague in The Netherlands. That was an important turning point in her development. It was at this meeting that she met Selma James and Wilmette Brown of the International Wages for Housework Campaign. Immediately the connection between the rights of domestic workers and the struggle for the recognition of women’s unwaged domestic labour became clear and from henceforth a relationship would develop which would continue for close to thirty years.

She would subsequently speak at conferences in Vienna, Austria; Turin, Italy; Nairobi, Kenya; Beijing, China and London in the United Kingdom as well as Kingston, Jamaica. NUDE became the local representative of the International Wages for Housework Campaign.

== Successes ==
Amongst the successes attributed to Clotil Walcott and her campaigns through the NUDE were:

- The passing of the Minimum Wages and Terms and Conditions of Service for Household Assistants Order under the Minimum Wages Act Chapter 88:04:18- 17, November 1982; This included – minimum wages, a 44-hour work week; overtime rates for public holidays, maternity leave, vacation leave etc.;
- The passing of the Unremunerated Work Act, 1995 which allows for the counting of unwaged work in national statistics. This made Trinidad and Tobago one of the first countries in the world to pass such legislation and the Trinidad and Tobago language being used as the model for the Beijing Declaration on Women.

== Honours ==
Over the years, Clotil Walcott's were recognised by many organisation including:

- 9 June 1984 – Bank and General Workers Union Grand Certificate of Honour for service and dedication in the trade union movement.
- 1985 – The Star Citizen Award – Peoples Popular Movement.
- 1991 – Servant and Hero of Labour Award – Council of Progressive Trade Unions (CPTU).
- 1991 – Network of NGO’s for the Advancement of Women for Outstanding Contribution to the Women’s Movement.
- 8 March 1998 – Guardian Women of Trinidad and Tobago Award – for her sterling contributions to the social life of Trinidad and Tobago.
- 1995 – The Partners of The Americas – In Recognition of your 30 years of dedicated service which achieved recognition of the value of women’s work.
- 31, August 1998 – The Humming Bird Medal (silver) – for Loyal and Devoted service to the Republic of Trinidad and Tobago in the sphere of Trade Unionism.
- 24, January 1999, Women of the Year – Women Working for Social Progress,
- 2000 – The Mayor, members of Council and the Burgesses of Arima award for Community Service in Recognition of her Contribution towards the Development of Arima.
- 8, March 2003– Network of NGO’s for the Advancement of Women – International Women’s Day 2003 as a Pioneering Women.
- 8, March 2006 – Ministry of Community Development, Culture and Gender Affairs, in recognition of her contribution to the creation of legislation for the counting of unwaged work.

== See also ==
- National Union of Domestic Employees

== Note ==
Most of the information for this article, and much of the text, has been reproduced from a tribute written by Dr. Rhoda Reddock following Clotil Walcott's death on 20 November 2007. Clotil Walcott 1925–2007 – A Tribute – By Dr. Rhoda Reddock
