= Afua Cooper =

Jamaican-born Canadian historian

- Born: 8 November 1957 (age 69); Westmoreland, Jamaica
- Occupations: Historian, author, dub poet
- Awards: Portia White Prize (2020)

Academic background
- Education: University of Toronto
- Thesis: "Doing Battle in Freedom's Cause": Henry Bibb, Abolitionism, Race Uplift, and Black Manhood, 1842-1854 (May 2001)
- Doctoral advisor: Franca Iacovetta
- Other advisors: Ruth Roach Pierson, Ian Radforth, Alison Prentice, and Richard Blackett

Afua Ava Pamela Cooper ONS (born 8 November 1957) is a Jamaican-born Canadian historian. As a historian, "she has taught Caribbean cultural studies, history, women's studies and Black studies at Ryerson and York universities, at the University of Toronto and at Dalhousie University." She is also an author and dub poet who, as of 2018, has published five volumes of poetry.

== Personal life and education ==
Cooper was born 8 November 1957 in Westmoreland, Jamaica to Edward and Ruth Campbell Cooper and had eight siblings—five sisters and three brothers. She is a descendant of Alison Parkinson, who was sold into West Indian slavery. Descendants on her father's side of the family worked as slaves on William Cooper's Whithorn sugar plantation.

Between ages three and eight, Cooper moved in with her aunt, Elfleda Campbell, in Kingston, Jamaica, where she studied at St. Michael's All-Age School and Camperdown High School. By the time she graduated in 1975, Cooper had founded an African Studies Club at her school and had become a Rastafarian. After graduation, she moved in with Mutabaruka and his wife, Yvonne Peters for a year. In 1976, she received a teaching certificate from Excelsior Community College.

In 1980, Cooper migrated to Toronto due to civil unrest in Jamaica. Her first son, Akil, was born the following year.

In 1983, Cooper enrolled at New College, University of Toronto, where she majored in African studies. In 1990, she returned to complete a Master of Arts degree, studying Black Canadian history. In 2000, she earned a PhD in African-Canadian history with specialties in slavery and abolition. Her dissertation, "Doing Battle in Freedom's Cause", is a biographical study of Henry Bibb, a 19th-century African-American abolitionist who lived and worked in Ontario. Her dissertation served as inspiration for the Canadian government "to designate Bibb a person of national historic significance."

Cooper's marriage dissolved in 1986.

In 1988, Cooper became a Muslim.

== Career ==
=== Academia and education ===
Before moving to Canada, Cooper taught at Vauxhall Secondary School for a year. Upon arrival in Toronto, she taught at Bickford Park High School.

Beginning in 2004, Cooper began teaching African Canadian history and women's history at University of Toronto.

In 2009, she helped establish the Black Canadian Studies Association.

In 2011, Cooper was named to the James Robinson Johnston Chair in Black Canadian Studies at Dalhousie University. In 2016, she led the creation of a minor program in black and African diaspora studies at Dalhousie.

=== Poetry and other writing ===
Breaking Chains, Cooper's first book of poetry, as published in 1983.

In 1988, Cooper became a residency fellow at the Banff School of Fine Arts and wrote two books of poetry, The Red Caterpillar on College Street, which was published in 1989, and Memories Have Tongue, which was published in 1992. Both books were published by Sister Vision Press. Memories Have Tongue went on to become a finalist for the 1992 Casa de las Américas Prize.

In 1990, Cooper opened the festivities in Queen's Park, Toronto celebrating the release of Nelson Mandela from prison; the crowd for her performance is estimated to have included 25,000 people. Later in the year, she toured Senegal and Gambia.

She is the co-author of We're Rooted Here and They Can't Pull Us Up: Essays in African Canadian Women's History (1994). She has also released two albums of her poetry.

In 2002, Cooper helped found the Dub Poets' Collective, "the only grassroots poetry organization in Canada".

Published in 2006, The Hanging of Angelique tells the story of an enslaved African Marie-Joseph Angelique who was executed in Montreal at a time when Quebec was under French colonial rule. It was shortlisted for the 2006 Governor General's Award for English-language non-fiction.

In 2009, Cooper published two historical novels for children about real historical figures, both published by Kids Can Press: My name is Henry Bibb: a story of slavery and freedom; and My name is Phillis Wheatley: a story of slavery and freedom, both published in 2009 by Kids Can Press.

In 2018, she was named poet laureate for the city of Halifax, holding the role until 2020.

== Awards and honours ==
Cooper has several numerous scholarships, grants, and fellows, including the following: Margaret S. McCullough Graduate Scholarship from the University of Toronto (1997-1998), Federal Ministry of Heritage grant for historical research, University of Toronto Exceptional Student Award (1998-1999), the John Nicholas Brown Center Fellowship from Brown University (2001), Canada Council Research Grant (2001), and a Canada Council Writing Grant (2003).

As a historian and educator, she has also received the following awards: Marta Danylewycz Award for Historical Research (1995), Commonwealth of Kentucky Award for Contribution to Kentucky history (2002), Canadian Federal Government Award for Contribution to Black History, Academic Leadership Award from University of Toronto Black Alumni (2004), and the Harry Jerome Award for Professional Excellence (2005).

In 2015, she received the Nova Scotia Human Rights Commission's Dr. Burnley Allan “Rocky” Jones Award, and in 2020, she was awarded the Portia White Prize at the Creative Nova Scotia Awards Gala.

In 2024, Cooper was made a Member of the Order of Nova Scotia.

Awards for Cooper's writing
Year	Title	Award	Result	Ref.
1994	We're Rooted Here and They Can't Pull Us Up	Ontario Historical Society's Joseph Brant Award for History	Winner	
1992	Memories Have Tongue	Casa de las Américas Prize	Finalist	
2006	The Hanging of Angélique	Governor General's Award for English-language non-fiction	Shortlist	

== Books ==
- Breaking Chains (Weelahs, 1983)
- Red Caterpillar On College Street (Sister Vision Press, 1989)
- Memories Have Tongue: Poetry (Sister Vision Press, 1992)
- We're Rooted Here and They Can't Pull Us Up: Essays in African Canadian Women's History, with Peggy Bristow, Dionne Brand, Linda Carty, Sylvia Hamilton and Adrienne Shadd (University of Toronto Press, 1994)
- Utterances and Incantations: Women, Poetry, and Dub (Sister Vision Press, 1999)
- The Underground Railroad: Next Stop, Toronto!, with Adrienne Shadd and Carolyn Smardz Frost (Natural Heritage Books, 2002)
- The Hanging of Angélique, The Untold Story of Canadian Slavery and the Burning of Old Montréal (HarperCollins, 2006)
- Copper Woman and Other Poems(Natural Heritage Books, 2006)
- My Name is Henry Bibb: A Story of Slavery and Freedom [historical fiction] (Kids Can Press, 2009)
- My Name is Phillis Wheatley: A Story of Slavery and Freedom [historical fiction] (Kids Can Press, 2009)
- "To Learn… Even a Little, The Letters of Solomon Washington," in Hoping for Home, The Stories of Arrival (Scholastic Canada, 2011), 171–91.

== Discography ==
- WomanTalk: Women Dub Poets (Heartbeat Records, 1984)
- Poetry Is Not a Luxury (Maya Music Group, 1985)
- Your Silence Will Not Protect You (Maya Music, 1986)
- Sunshine (Maya Music Group, 1989)
- Worlds of Fire (Soundmind Productions, 2002)
- Love and Revolution (Soundmind Productions, 2014)
