= Clyde Elder =

Trinidad and Tobago trade unionist and politician

The Honourable Clyde Elder MP

MP for La Brea
- Incumbent
- Assumed office 3 May 2025
- Preceded by: Stephen McClashie

Personal details
- Party: United National Congress (UNC)
- Other political affiliations: Movement for Social Justice (MSJ)

Clyde Elder is a Trinidad and Tobago trade unionist and politician who served as Secretary General of the Communication Workers Union. He is the United National Congress member of parliament representing the La Brea constituency, and serves as Minister in the Ministry of Public Utilities.

== Career ==
Elder worked for Telecommunications Services of Trinidad and Tobago (TSTT) when he was elected Secretary General of the Communication Workers Union in 2017. The company granted him unpaid leave from 2017 to 2020 while he held a full-time position with the union.

In 2018 when Elder was part of a group of 503 workers who were retrenched by TSTT. At the time of the retrenchment, Elder was on unpaid leave from the company. In 2025 the Industrial Court ordered the company to reinstate Elder with full pay and retirement benefits he would have received over that period, and an additional TT$100,000 in exemplary damages.

Elder served two terms as Secretary General of the Communication Workers Union from 2017 to 2020 and from 2020 to 2023. He was a member of the pro-labour Movement for Social Justice until he resigned to contest the La Brea seat for the UNC in February 2025.

== Politics ==
Elder contested the La Brea seat for the UNC in the 2025 general elections, and defeated the People's National Movement's Randall Mitchell. He was the first non-PNM candidate to win the seat since 1986 when Albert Richards of the National Alliance for Reconstruction won the seat.

On May 3, 2025, he was appointed Minister in the Ministry of Public Utilities in the Persad-Bissessar administration.

== Electoral history ==
2025 Trinidad and Tobago general election: La Brea
Party	Candidate	Votes	%	±%
UNC	Clyde Elder	7,001	50.1%	▲
PNM	Randall Mitchell	6,262	45.3%	▼
PF	Carla Garcia	413	4.0%	Steady
All People's Party (Trinidad and Tobago)	Renision Jeffrey	53	0.4%	Steady
The Hyarima Movement	Francis Morean	24	0.2%	Steady
Majority		739	4.8%	▲
Turnout		13,824	51.94%	
Registered electors		26,616		
UNC gain from PNM		Swing	%	
