= Brian Manning (politician) =

Trinidad and Tobago politician

The Honourable Brian Manning MP

Member of Parliament for San Fernando East
- Incumbent
- Assumed office 19 August 2020
- Preceded by: Randall Mitchell

Personal details
- Party: People's National Movement (PNM)
- Education: University of Maryland, College Park; University of Miami

Brian Manning is a Trinidad and Tobago politician representing the People's National Movement (PNM). He has served as a Member of Parliament in the House of Representatives for San Fernando East since the 2020 general election. He is a current Minister in the Ministry of Finance.

== Early life ==
Manning is the eldest son of Patrick Manning, former Prime Minister for Trinidad and Tobago, and Hazel Manning, former Minister of Education and Minister of Local Government. He has one brother, David. He lived in Marabella for several years growing up.

He received a bachelors' of art in economics and a bachelors' of science in information systems management from the University of Maryland, College Park. He also obtained a masters' of science in finance and asset management from the University of Maryland and a masters' of business administration in international business and marketing from the University of Miami. He received a certificate in advanced business Spanish from the Venezuelan embassy in Trinidad and Tobago.

== Career ==
Manning was previously a business analyst at Massy Energy Services Ltd and an investment banker at RBC Caribbean. He also worked as a small, medium enterprise financing officer at the Inter-American Development Bank in Washington, D.C., where he focused on businesses in the Caribbean and Central America. He founded Shining World Consultancy Ltd in 2006 and acted as executive director. He has held the position of equity analyst at the University of Maryland’s Robert H. Smith School Global Equity Fund and served as editor of the Business Guardian for six months.

=== Political career ===
He contested the constituency of San Fernando East in the 2020 general election, the seat that his father held from 1971 to 2015. He was nominated by the People's National Movement screening committee in May 2020, receiving 14 of 24 votes from the party's executive and beating the incumbent MP, Randall Mitchell, for the nomination. He pinpointed youth unemployment and aging infrastructure as two areas of focus within the district. He ran against Monifa Russell Andrews from the United National Congress.

He was appointed as a Minister in the Ministry of Finance on 19 August 2020. He was re-elected in the 2025 Trinidad and Tobago general election. This was following a recount in San Fernando East.

== Personal life ==
Manning married Shelly Dass, a former media executive, at Stollmeyer's Castle in Port of Spain on 12 December 2020. He served as president of the Trinidad and Tobago Basketball Federation in 2008.

== Electoral history ==
2025 Trinidad and Tobago general election: San Fernando East
Party	Candidate	Votes	%	±%
PNM	Brian Manning	7,026	50.5%	▼
UNC	John Michael Alibocas	6,357	45.7%	▲
PF	Kenrick Serrette	490	3.5%	Steady
Majority		669	4.8%	
Turnout		13,909	54.19%	
Registered electors		25,667		
PNM hold				

Political offices
Preceded by Randall Mitchell	Member of Parliament for San Fernando East; 2020–present	Incumbent
