= Customs and Excise Extra Guards Association =

CEEGA
- Customs and Excise Extra Guards Association
- Headquarters: Port of Spain, Trinidad and Tobago
- Location: Trinidad and Tobago
- Key people: Andre Cabarr President
- Affiliations: NATUC

The Customs and Excise Extra Guards Association is a trade union in Trinidad and Tobago which represents Extra Guards in the Customs and Excise Division of the Ministry of Finance.

== See also ==
- List of trade unions
