= Emperor Valley Zoo Staff Association =

Trade union in Trinidad and Tobago

EVZSA
- Emperor Valley Zoo Staff Association
- Headquarters: Port of Spain, Trinidad and Tobago
- Location: Trinidad and Tobago
- Affiliations: NATUC

The Emperor Valley Zoo Staff Association is a trade union in Trinidad and Tobago. It organises monthly paid employees at the Emperor Valley Zoo in Port of Spain.

== See also ==
- List of trade unions
