= Communication Workers Union (Trinidad and Tobago) =

CWU
- Communication Workers' Union
- Founded: 1953
- Headquarters: Port of Spain, Trinidad and Tobago
- Location: Trinidad and Tobago
- Key people: Joely Mohammed - President; Clyde Elder
- Affiliations: FITUN

The Communication Workers Union is a trade union in Trinidad and Tobago which has the bulk of its members in the Telecommunications Services of Trinidad and Tobago (TSTT). The Union has Recognised Majority (RMU) status at TSTT, Hilton Trinidad, Caribbean Lifts, RBP Lifts and Massy Communications. According to the union's constitution financial members may vote for and elect a board of eleven members to oversee the Union's business for a term. A term last three years and the last elections took place in 2017. Of the eleven elected executive board members, two are full time officers. The executive board members positions are as follows: Secretary General (the head of the union and a full time officer), President (head of administration and a full time officer), Deputy Secretary General (to fill in when the Secretary General is unavailable), Vice President (to fill in when the president in unavailable), Treasurer, Deputy Treasurer, Research Officer, Education Officer and Trustee (3 positions).

== See also ==
- List of trade unions
