= Swing Bridge (disambiguation) =

A swing bridge is a movable bridge that swivels to bring a road or other crossingway into place.

Swing Bridge may also refer to:

- Swing Bridge (Belize), in Belize City
- Swing Bridge (Keeseville, New York), listed on the US NRHP
- Swing Bridge, River Tyne, UK
- Simple suspension bridge, also called a "swing bridge" (in New Zealand)

== See also ==
- Swinging Bridge (disambiguation)
