= Tara Ramoutar =

Trinidad and Tobago human rights activist (1953–2020)

- Born: 1953; San Fernando, Trinidad and Tobago
- Died: 2020 (aged 66–67)
- Occupations: Trade unionist Human rights activist
- Organization: Caribbean Association for Feminist Research and Action

Tara Ramoutar (1953–2020) was a human rights activist and trade unionist from Trinidad and Tobago. Born into a progressive Indo-Trinidadian family, she first worked as a trade unionist for the Transport and Industrial Workers Union during the 1970s. Ramoutar later shifted to women's rights, becoming an early member of the women's organisation Concerned Women for Progress in the 1980s and, from the 1990s, a member and later leader of the Caribbean Association for Feminist Research and Action's Trinidad and Tobago chapter.

== Early life ==
Ramoutar was born in 1953 in San Fernando, Trinidad, into an Indo-Trinidadian family that grew sugarcane, rice and garden vegetables. Her father was politically progressive, and Ramoutar grew up listening to world news and national and international politics, in addition to learning about the poor conditions for workers, and the struggle for workers' rights worldwide.

While still at secondary school, Ramoutar joined her first protest, taking part in a march by the Oilfields Workers' Trade Union in south Trinidad in March 1964. She later said she had been inspired by the counterculture of the 1960s, as well as the works of Karl Marx and the socialist movements occurring at the time in Poland, Russia and Cuba.

== Activism ==
=== 1970s–1980s: Transport and Industrial Workers Union ===
Ramoutar's first job was at a Bata shop, but she soon left to become an officer worker for the Transport and Industrial Workers Union during the 1970s. During her time at TIWU, Ramoutar joined its women's arm, and became more aware of the exploitation of women in the workforce, who constituted the majority of low-paid workers in garment factories and other unorganised industries, and who had little power to negotiate their working conditions. While at TIWU, Ramoutar took part in marches, meetings, workshops, seminars, conferences, and industrial actions.

=== 1981–1983: Concerned Women for Progress ===
By January 1981, Concerned Women for Progress, a women's organisation inspired by second-wave feminism, had been established by trade unionists Patricia Bynoe, Patricia Mohammed, Cathy Shepherd, Gaietry Pargass and Salisha Hosein. The CWP promoted itself in the local Trinidadian and Tobagonian press as being a "new women's guard" that aimed to provide "an organised forum for women to meet, discuss and confront problems in their everyday lives", and to work towards "social and economic equality" for women. That year, Ramoutar represented TIWU at a meeting of women's rights activists convened by the People's Popular Movement, where she likely first became aware of the CWP and its work. Ramoutar, alongside fellow TIWU member Thelma Henderson, subsequently joined the CWP and remained members until its operations ceased in 1983.

During her time with the CWP, Ramoutar ran educational sessions for women in Beetham Estate Gardens. She also participated in its successful campaign to have "legitimate" and "illegitimate" markers removed from birth certificates. Less successful was Ramoutar's attempts to increase public participation in the anti-consumerist movement through a campaign over Christmas 1981 aimed at reducing the amount of money people spent on gifts. Ramoutar used her links with the TIWU to use its facilities in Laventille to host meetings and to celebrate International Women's Day in 1981 and 1982. In May 1981, Ramoutar took part in a picket of a beauty pageant organised by Janelle Commissiong at the Jean Pierre Complex in Port of Spain, protesting against women being judged on the basis of their physical attributes, which was felt to go against second-wave feminist principles.

=== 1993–2016: Caribbean Association for Feminist Research and Action ===
In 1993, Ramoutar joined the regional secretariat of the Caribbean Association for Feminist Research and Action, where she was mentored by CWP co-founder Cathy Shepherd. During her time with the organisation, she attended its third general meeting in Guyana, and participated in its preparations for the World Conference on Women, 1995 held in Beijing, China. Supported by the United Nations Development Fund for Women, Ramoutar led CAFRA's year-long regional campaign on violence against women.

In April 2003, Ramoutar was elected to serve as CAFRA's national representative for Trinidad and Tobago. She remained in the position until 2014 or 2016. During her tenure with CAFRA TT, she organised the Stop the Violence: Protect Women's Health seminar in November 2006; the Walk Against Domestic Violence in Chaguanas in November 2008; the Wellness Seminar for Women in June 2010; and the Domestic Violence and Pregnancy seminar in November 2012.

CAFRA frequently experienced financial difficulties, and Ramoutar frequently led fundraising efforts to keep CAFRA TT afloat. In 2009, she ran for president of CAFRA, but ultimately lost the election; the CAFRA House in Trinidad and Tobago later was turned into a rental property, though the organisation continued to exist.

== Political views ==
Ramoutar described herself as a radical feminist early in her career, though in an interview in 2014 she stated she had moved away from the term, though still strongly identified as a feminist. During the 1970s and 1980s, she was a supporter of socialism and socialist regimes, and was a member of the Cuba Friendship Association, alongside Michael Als, James Millette and Vincent Cabrera.

Ramoutar lamented in 2011 that only women appeared interested in achieving gender equality in Trinidad and Tobago. She said the traditional notion of raising boys to be "strong and macho" and girls to be "tender and soft-hearted" contributed to high levels of domestic abuse in the country, and that for it to reduce, men needed to be more accepting of female empowerment.

Ramoutar often called for the greater prominence of women in Trinidad and Tobago's government. She supported Kamla Persad-Bissessar's campaign to become leader of the United National Congress in 2009, and publicly praised Jearlean John's appointment as head of UDeCOTT in 2013. In 2010, Ramoutar called on the government to legalise abortion, homosexuality and same-sex marriage; for the Domestic Violence Act 1999 to be reviewed and improved; and for greater government support to be offered concerning maternal health and girls' education.

== Death and recognition ==
Ramoutar had no children. She died on 19 September 2020 after a long battle with cancer.

Following her death, various members of the CWP and CAFRA paid tribute to Ramoutar. CWP co-founder Patriica Mohammed remembered her as "a foot soldier who did not seek attention but who would ensure she delivered on her promises", as well as a "stalwart founding member [of] Caribbean feminism". Rawwida Baksh, a founding member of CAFRA, praised her contributions to the creation of a regional feminist movement in the Caribbean; CAFRA itself described Ramoutar as "a star shining above the hills and mountain tops", with delegates from Jamaica, Dominica, Suriname and Barbados issuing their own tributes to her. CAFTA TT conclude its tribute to Ramoutar with "walk good, Sistah!".

Ramoutar was also remembered by human rights groups organisations such as the Caribbean Centre for Human Rights, Women's Institute for Alternative Development, the Family Planning Association of Trinidad and Tobago, and the University of the West Indies' Institute for Gender and Development Studies. Her obituary was published in the Trinidad and Tobago Guardian.
