= The Swinging Bridge =

2003 novel by Ramabai Espinet

- First edition
- Author: Ramabai Espinet
- Published: 2003 HarperCollins
- Publication place: Canada
- Pages: 320
- ISBN: 978-1-4434-2615-2

The Swinging Bridge is a novel by Ramabai Espinet, published in 2003 by HarperCollins Publishing. In 2004, the novel was short-listed for the Commonwealth Writers' Prize in the category of Best First Book (Caribbean and Canada Region). Espinet's novel focuses on a multi-generational Indo-Trinidadian family living in Canada, touching on a number of themes and topics such as gender identity and matrilineal ties.

Ramabai Espinet is an Indo-Trinidadian author born in San Fernando, Trinidad and Tobago, in 1948. Since she originally migrated to Canada in the 1970s, Espinet has divided her time between the Caribbean and Canada. Espinet received her Ph.D. from the University of the West Indies in Saint Augustine, Trinidad and Tobago after graduating from York University in Toronto, Ontario. She is currently a professor at Seneca College. Some of her other notable works besides The Swinging Bridge include Beyond the Kalapani, The Princess of Spadina, and Ninja's Carnival.

== Major themes ==
The major themes of the novel are:

- Silencing of history and its voices
- Immigration
- Cultural, gender, and sexual oppression
- Marginalization of Indo-Caribbean families
- Historical archive with primary sources
- "Double Diaspora" — both the Indian diaspora in the Caribbean and the Indo-Caribbean diaspora in North America (IE: Canada)
- Music, songwriting
- Feminism
- Rape and sexual violence

== Plot summary ==
Mona, a Trinidadian living in Montreal, is a film researcher whose family left Trinidad for Canada in hopes of finding a better life. At the start of her story, Mona gets word from her sister, Babs, that their brother, Kello, is dying. Kello tells his family that he is dying of lymphoma, but later reveals that he is actually dying from AIDS. He reveals to his sisters that he is in a relationship with a man, but swears them to secrecy. As the oldest, Kello asks Mona to return to Trinidad after his death and buy the family land back. Mona is hesitant, but eventually learns that she was given this opportunity to discover more about her family history, their journey from India to Trinidad, and the hardships they had to face along the way.

Throughout the novel, Mona unveils the significance of the historical archive for the history of her family, women, and the greater Indo-Trinidadian culture over the course of several generations and migrations. She gives voice to the marginalized voices that were silenced by the past and even by her own people. Set in modern times, this novel interconnects the past to the present. As Mona discovers these hidden histories, she also comes to discover herself. The "Swinging Bridge" serves as a symbol of her life journey and the journey of her ancestors.

== Historical context ==
- Kala pani (Espinet 4, 89)
- "Coolie" (Espinet 58)
- Caribbean (Trinidad and Tobago) Carnival (Espinet 69-70)
- J'ouvert
- Eric Williams
- Cécile Fatiman--Mambo priestess, influential in the beginnings of the Haitian Revolution
- Calypso Music
- Chinese Immigration to the Caribbean
