= Sonia Cuales =

Curaçaoan feminist activist and writer (1941–2018)

Sonia Magdalena Cuales (October 3, 1941 – July 14, 2018) was a Curaçaoan feminist activist and writer. Her work in the United Nations system and with various advocacy groups focused on the intersection of women's rights and development across the Caribbean.

== Career ==
Sonia Cuales was born in Curaçao in 1941. She immigrated to the Netherlands, where she studied anthropology and development sociology at Leiden University, obtaining a PhD in non-Western sociology. Through her studies at Leiden, she conducted research on women laborers in Latin America and the Caribbean, and on the role of Jews in the historical development of Curaçao. She became involved in the Antillian Women’s Organizations in the Netherlands during her years living there.

Cuales returned to the Americas in the 1970s, and she became an active participant in the Caribbean's second-wave feminist movement. She helped found the Caribbean Association for Feminist Research and Action (CAFRA) in 1985. She was also a founding member of the Caribbean Network on Studies of Masculinities in 1997 and helped support the launching of the Annual Female Leadership Conferences in Curaçao in 2004. In part through Development Alternatives with Women for a New Era (DAWN), she was also involved in advocacy on reproductive rights.

She worked in Colombia as a project officer for UNICEF's Regional Office in Latin America and the Caribbean, overseeing the organization's assistance to Guyana and Suriname. She was then assigned to the United Nations Economic Commission for Latin America and the Caribbean, working in Trinidad as a social affairs officer focusing on women and development. She also worked on poverty eradication efforts. After 18 years in the United Nations system, Cuales retired in 2001.

In addition to her U.N. work, Cuales lectured on women's studies at the University of the Netherlands Antilles, now the University of Curaçao.

=== Writing ===
Cuales authored various academic articles on women and feminism in the Caribbean. She had an early interest in socialism, and she wrote frequently on the intersection of class and gender.

She contributed to the 1984 anthology Sisterhood Is Global, writing on feminism in the Dutch-speaking Caribbean.

== Personal life and recognition ==
Sonia Cuales had one daughter, Gladys Cuales.

She died in Curaçao in 2018. In 2020, she was honored as that year's Outstanding Woman during the 17th Annual Female Leadership Conference in Curaçao.
