= Seamen and Waterfront Workers Trade Union =

Trade union in Trinidad and Tobago

SWWTU
- Seamen and Waterfront Workers Trade Union
- Headquarters: Port of Spain, Trinidad and Tobago
- Location: Trinidad and Tobago
- Key people: Michael Annisette, President
- Affiliations: NATUC, ITF

The Seamen and Waterfront Workers Trade Union is a trade union in Trinidad and Tobago.

The union was founded in 1937 by Cecil Alexander (died 1956), who also was long-term president of the Union. In 1954 the union had a membership of around 2,000 and was based in Charlotte Street, Port of Spain. It was member of the Trinidad and Tobago Federation of Trade Unions. As of 2024 the union is part of the trade union federation National Trade Union Centre of Trinidad and Tobago (NATUC).

Its historical base was the port but this has shrunk in significance over the years. It retains a dock and seafarers membership but has expanded into organising local factories such as National Flour Mills (NFM) and the West Indian Tobacco Company (WITCO), a cigarette making company.

== See also ==
- List of trade unions
- Sailors' superstitions
