= Public Services Association =

PSA
- Public Services Association of Trinidad and Tobago
- Founded: 1938
- Headquarters: Port of Spain, Trinidad and Tobago
- Location: Trinidad and Tobago
- Members: Approx 17,000 (2010)
- Key people: Felisha Thomas, President
- Affiliations: Public Services International; Caribbean Public Services Association
- Website: psatrinbagott.org

The Public Services Association of Trinidad and Tobago is the largest trade union in Trinidad and Tobago representing public officers and workers from over 100 organizations nationally, both in the state sector and private sector. It was originally known as the Civil Service Association but changed its name in 1971.

The bulk of the PSA membership is in the public sector but it also includes members in statutory authorities such as the Water and Sewerage Authority (WASA) and private organizations such as Swissport.

== See also ==
- List of trade unions
- James Manswell
