= National Trade Union Centre of Trinidad and Tobago =

NATUC
- National Trade Union Centre of Trinidad and Tobago
- Founded: June 1990
- Headquarters: Port of Spain, Trinidad and Tobago
- Location: Trinidad and Tobago
- Members: 80,000 (2006)
- Key people: Watson Duke, President; Vincent Cabrera, General Secretary
- Affiliations: ITUC; Caribbean Congress of Labour

The National Trade Union Centre of Trinidad and Tobago (NATUC) is a trade union federation in Trinidad and Tobago. It was created in 1991 by the merger of the Trinidad and Tobago Labour Congress (TTLC) and the Council of Progressive Trade Unions (CPTU). It has a membership of 100,000.

The NATUC is affiliated to the International Trade Union Confederation and the Caribbean Congress of Labour.

Following the 2000 Convention, divisions took place in NATUC that resulted in the formation of the Federation of Independent Trade Unions and Non-Governmental Organisations (FITUN) as a separate trade union centre.

== Affiliated unions ==
Those unions affiliated to NATUC include:

- All Trinidad General Workers' Trade Union
- Amalgamated Workers Union
- Aviation, Communication and Allied Workers Union
- Banking, Insurance and General Workers Union
- Communication, Transport and General Workers Union
- Contractors and General Workers Trade Union
- Customs and Excise Extra Guards Association
- Electronic Media Union of Trinidad and Tobago
- Emperor Valley Zoo Staff Association
- National Petroleum Staff Association
- National Union of Domestic Employees
- National Union of Government and Federated Workers
- Oilfields Workers' Trade Union
- Seamen and Waterfront Workers Trade Union
- Steel Workers Union of Trinidad and Tobago
- Transport and Industrial Workers Union
- Trinidad and Tobago Postal Workers Union
- Trinidad and Tobago Unified Teachers Association

== See also ==
- List of trade unions
- List of federations of trade unions
