= Bank Employees' Union (Trinidad and Tobago) =

Trade union

The Bank Employees Union (BEU), a former trade union in Trinidad and Tobago, started as a staff association in 1974 out of a consultative committee which was adopted with partners from other banks in the Barclays group.

The association was registered on 2 May 1974 under the Trinidad and Tobago Trade Union Ordinance as Staff Association of Barclays Bank of Trinidad and Tobago Limited and won recognition on 21 April 1975. The name of the Union was changed when the bank's name changed to Republic Bank Limited in 1981.

Among the major developments in the Union's history was a strike in 1984 over a collective agreement for the period June 1984 to May 1987 and a lock-out initiated by the Bank in 1987.

The BEU merged with the Bank and General Workers Union on 21 February 2003 to form the Banking, Insurance and General Workers Union.

== See also ==
- List of trade unions
