= National Union of Domestic Employees =

NUDE
- National Union of Domestic Employees
- Headquarters: Arima, Trinidad and Tobago
- Location: Trinidad and Tobago
- Members: Approx 300
- Key people: Ida Le Blanc, General Secretary
- Affiliations: NATUC

The National Union of Domestic Employees is a trade union in Trinidad and Tobago.

In 1974, Clotil Walcott, along with James Lynch, Salisha Ali and others, established the National Union of Domestic Employees (NUDE) as a section of the Union of Ship Builders, Ship Repairers and Allied Workers Union (USSR). The bulletin announcing its formation stated: "Calling all persons serving in the capacity of cooks, kitchen helpers, maids, butlers, seamstresses, laundresses, barmen, babysitters, chauffeurs, messengers, yardmen and household assistants" heralding the union's concern with low income workers more generally in addition to domestic workers.

Apart from its normal trade union activities, it concentrates on campaigning for the rights of women workers and has long argued for the Industrial Relations Act to be amended to cover domestic workers.

== See also ==
- List of trade unions
