= Trinidad and Tobago Postal Workers Union =

Postal workers union in Trinidad and Tobago

TTPWU
- Trinidad and Tobago Postal Workers Union
- Headquarters: Arouca, Trinidad and Tobago, Trinidad and Tobago
- Location: Trinidad and Tobago
- Affiliations: NATUC

The Trinidad and Tobago Postal Workers Union is a trade union in Trinidad and Tobago which is the recognised union for postal workers employed by TTPost.

== See also ==
- List of trade unions
