= James Manswell =

Trade unionist and politician (1927–2006)

James Isaac Alexander Manswell (2 June 1927 – 18 September 2006) was born in Brighton La Brea, Trinidad and Tobago. He briefly entered the teaching profession in 1945 before joining the Civil Service on 14 July 1946 as a 2nd Class Clerk at the Port of Spain Magistracy. In 1950 he was elected Secretary of the Staff Side of the Magistracy Division of the Civil Service and followed that in 1955 by being elected to the Executive of the Civil Service Association(CSA) representing the Eastern Counties.

He became the Assistant Secretary of the CSA in 1960 at a time when Hugh Harris was the President and O. E. Morle the Secretary. The CSA appointed Manswell as it first full-time General Secretary in 1961.

In addition to his work for the CSA, he was also General Secretary of the Trinidad and Tobago Labour Congress and later its President. He was part of the workers delegation to the International Labour Conference of the International Labour Organization representing the Labour Congress in 1978 and on fourteen subsequent occasions. He was nominated by the Labour Congress to a number of State Boards including the T&T Mortgage Finance Company and the Investment Committee of the National Insurance Board.

In 1962 Manswell was one of the members of Prime Minister Eric Williams delegation to the Commonwealth Prime Ministers Conference as the nominee of the Labour Congress.

The continued development of the CSA saw the organisation purchasing properties in Port of Spain, including the current Head Office in Abercromby Street, Port of Spain, in 1965.

On being given a leave of absence from the Union in 1968, he successfully gained a Diploma of Social Studies at Oxford University and went on to complete the first year examination of the LLB Law Degree. His studies were interrupted by the death of the Union's President, Milton Adams, and in 1970 he returned to Trinidad and Tobago and his post in the Union.

He was instrumental in the formation of the Caribbean Public Services Association, of which he became the General Secretary in August 1970 – a position he held until his retirement from the Union in 1981.

He was directly responsible for the formation of the Public Service Credit Union which survives to this day.

Sir Ellis Clarke, then the President of the Republic of Trinidad and Tobago, appointed Manswell as an Independent Senator in 1976 and he remained in the Senate until his retirement from the Union.

He retired from the Public Services Association (the successor to the CSA) in 1981 having reached the position of First Executive President. However, he became a consultant to the Union in 1997 representing them in a matter in the Industrial Court as late as 2006.
