= Development Alternatives with Women for a New Era =

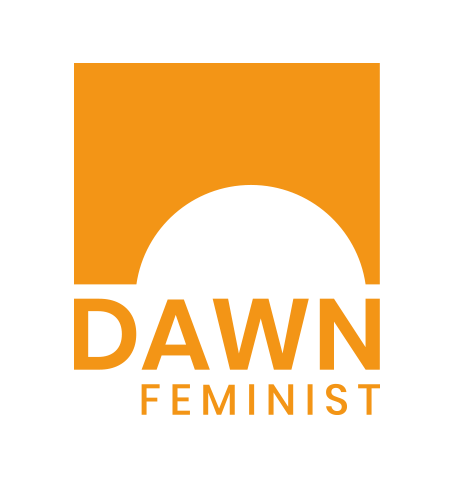
- Formation: 1984
- Headquarters: Suva, Fiji
- Website: www.dawnfeminist.org

Development Alternatives with Women for a New Era (DAWN) is a transnational feminist network of scholars, researchers and activists from the global South. DAWN works under the gender, ecology and economic justice (GEEJ) framework, which highlights the linkages between these three advocacy areas. The network offers a forum for feminist advocacy, research, and analysis on global social, political, and economic issues affecting women, with a focus on poor and marginalized women of the global South. This was a shift from the association of feminism with white, middle-class women of the global North common at the time of DAWN’s formation and into the present-day. Rafia Zakaria, author of Against White Feminism: Notes on Disruption, argues that DAWN and its empowerment approach to development offer a successful example of a bottom-up, antiracist alternative to political mobilization that decentres the whiteness prominent in dominant feminist development projects.

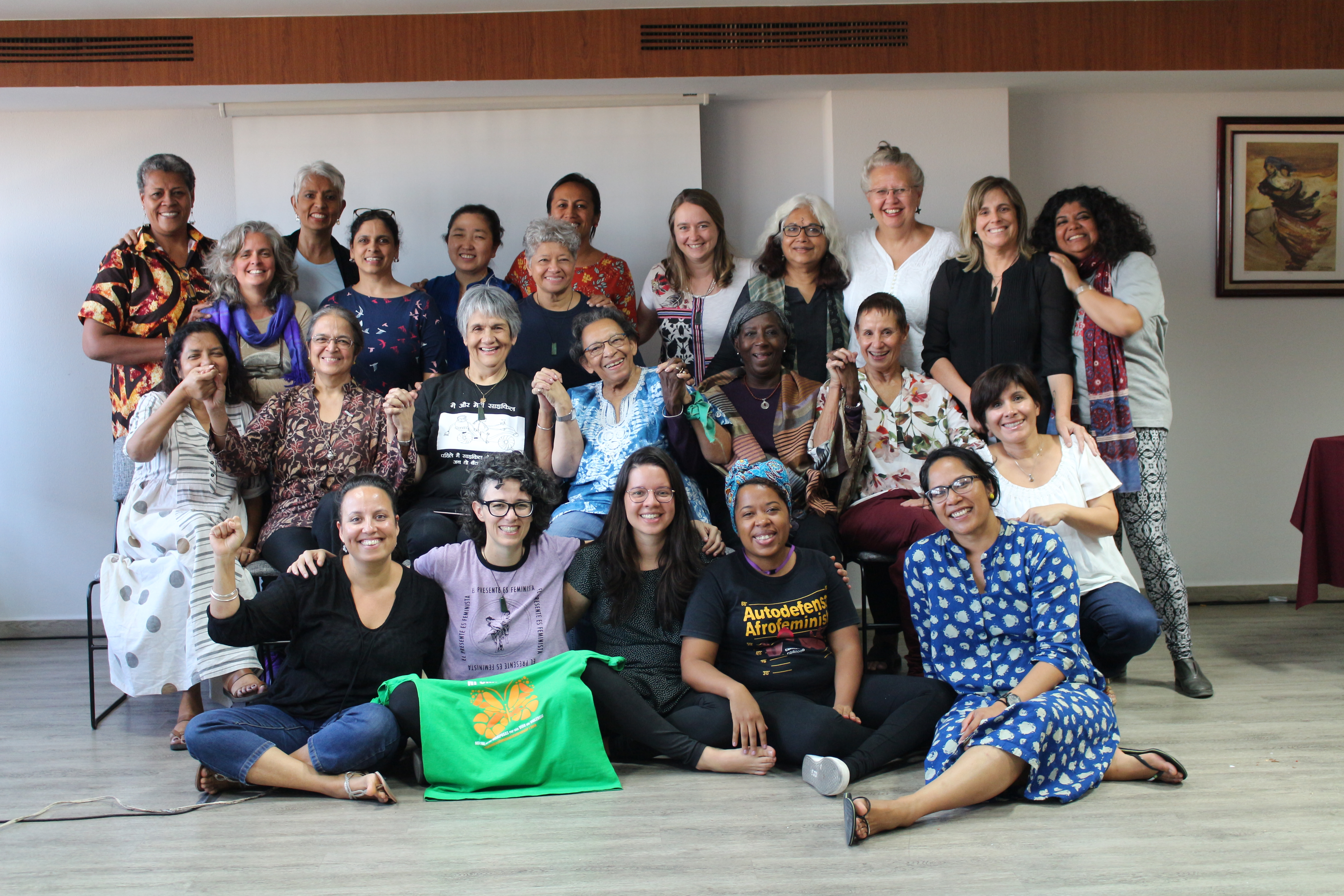
A group of DAWN members and partners at the Intergenerational Dialogues meeting, Mexico City, 2019

== History ==
DAWN, which today has its Secretariat based in Fiji, was founded in Bangalore, in 1984. The founding committee members were Neuma Aguiar (Brazil), Zubeida Ahmad (Pakistan), Peggy Antrobus (Barbados), Lourdes Arizpe (Mexico), Nirmala Banerjee (India), Carmen Barroso (Brazil), Ela Bhatt (India), Tone Bleie (Norway), Noeleen Heyzer (Malaysia), Hameeda Hossain (Bangladesh), Devaki Jain (India), Kumari Jayawardene (Sri Lanka), Isabel Larguia (Cuba), Ragnhild Lund (Norway), Geertje Lycklama (Netherlands), Lucille Mair (Jamaica), Katharine McKee (United States), Fatima Mernissi (Morocco), Achola Pala Okeyo (Kenya), Marie-Angelique Savane (Senegal), Gita Sen (India), and Claire Slatter (Fiji). Aguiar served as general coordinator of DAWN from 1986 to 1990, and was succeeded by Antrobus from 1991 to 1996.

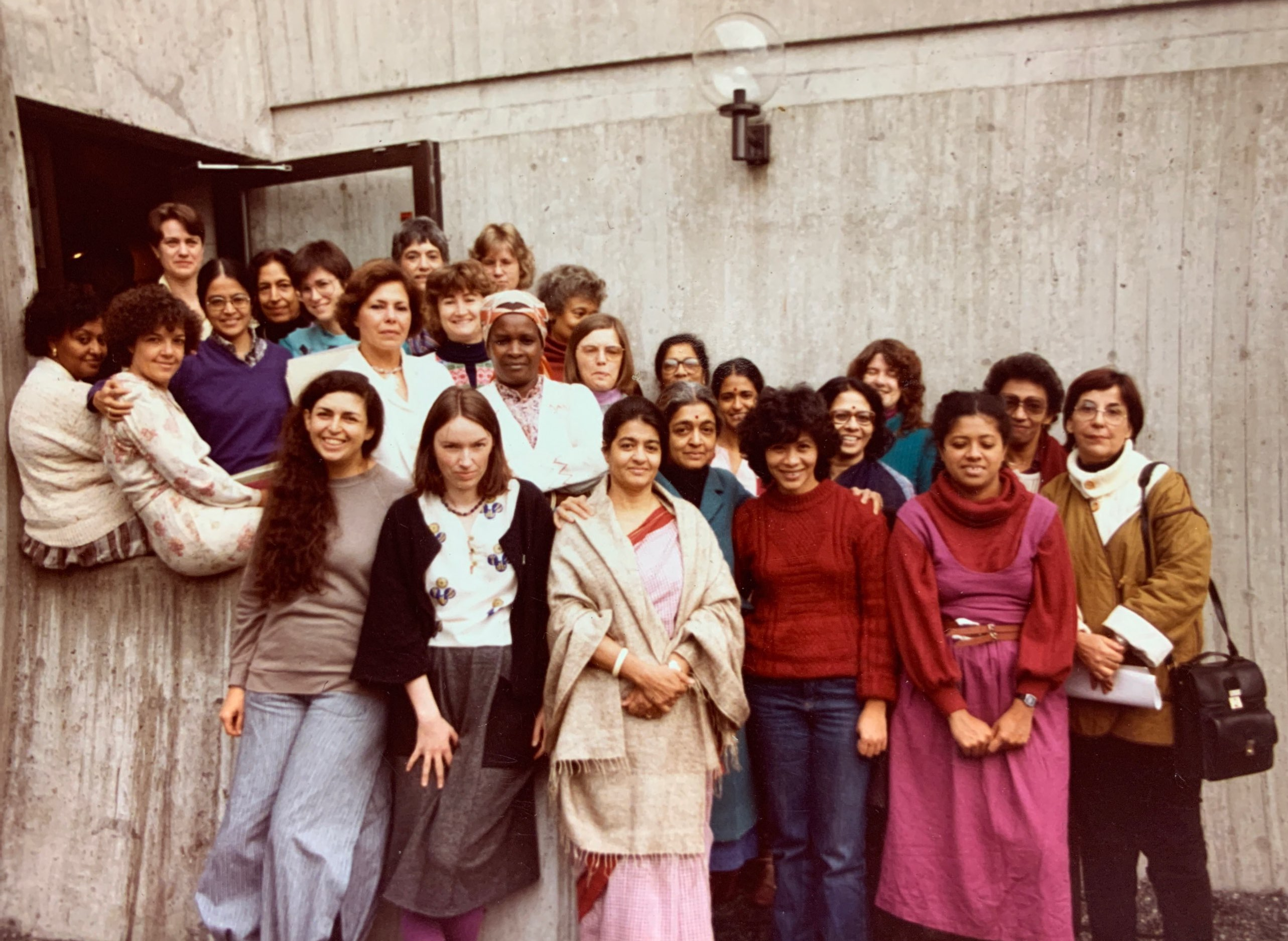
A meeting in Bergen to review a draft of DAWN's first book, early 1980s.

DAWN economists Gita Sen and Caren Grown presented a platform for a feminist economics at the 1985 World Conference on Women in Nairobi. The ideas which circulated there were later published as a book, Development, Crises, and Alternative Visions, Third World Women's Perspectives, considered to be DAWN’s manifesto.

== Development, Crises, and Alternative Visions ==
Development, Crises, and Alternative Visions critiqued mainstream development programs and envisioned an alternative feminist “paradigm” focusing on women’s empowerment.

The groundbreaking work included both broad, political analysis and practical advice for women’s organizations, connecting the more familiar, grassroots work that many women engaged in with macroeconomic analysis and critique of the neoliberal development practices responsible for women’s unfavourable circumstances globally. For instance, a food crisis in Africa, a crisis of poverty in South Asia, militarism in the Pacific Islands, and the Latin American debt crisis. It criticized the “integrationist” approach of the current “Women in Development” perspective for its assumption that “women’s main problem in the Third World is insufficient participation in an otherwise benevolent process of growth and development”. Instead, the “manifesto” claimed that structural and systemic change would do the work of eliminating inequality based on gender, race, and class everywhere and between nations.

This alternative left feminist vision emphasized “autonomous and equitable development” and focused on satisfying people’s basic needs. It situated women’s self-organization and empowerment as essential to realizing this vision. Authored by feminist academics, policymakers, and activists from the global South, the book argued that effective development can only stem from taking the standpoints of poor Third World women.

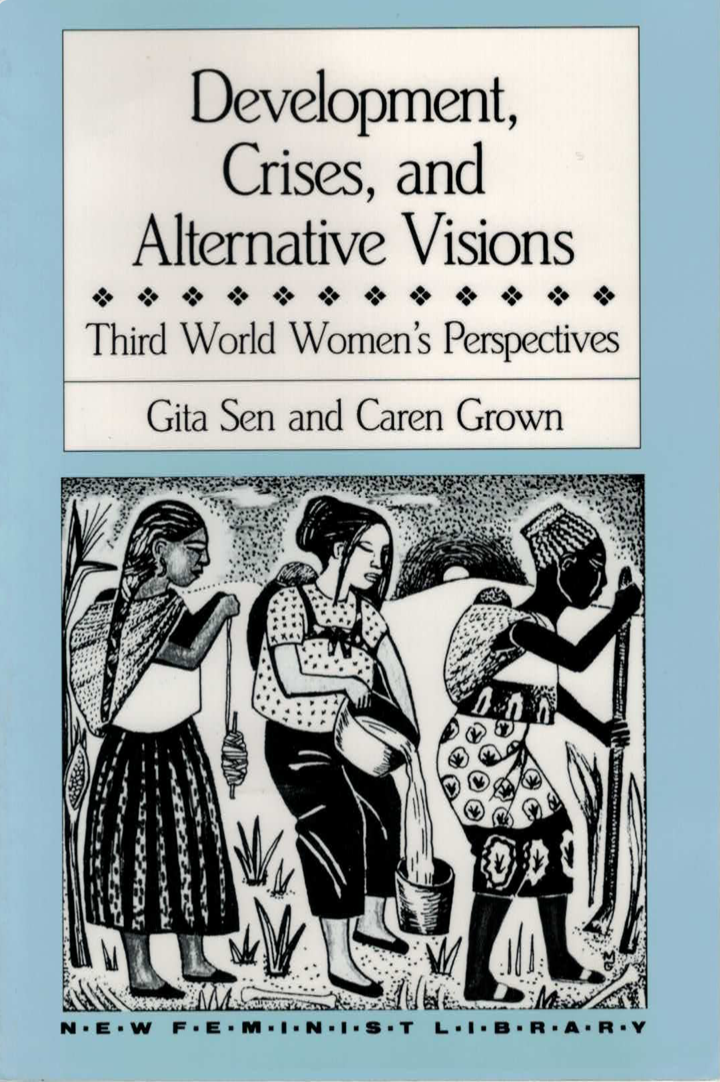
DAWN's first book, "Development, Crises, and Alternative Visions: Third World Women's Perspectives," (1985).

== Goals and activities ==
Engaging in both analysis and advocacy efforts, DAWN focuses on five key areas:

- Political Economy of Globalization(PEG)
- Sexual and Reproductive Health and Rights(SRHR)
- Political Restructuring and Social Transformation(PRST)
- Political Ecology and Sustainability(PEAS)
- Feminist Digital Justice(FDJ)

Work stemming from these research themes make up a number of books and publications, and have formed the basis of advocacy within intergovernmental processes (including for example RIO+20). Yet, as DAWN maintains close connections to activist communities, its project is equally focused on ‘networking’ with social movements, as well as on ‘training.’ Such networking involves engaging extensively and dialogically with grassroots movements (through seminars and workshops), which allows for the production of bottom-up knowledge with them, as well as bringing to them interlinkage analyses that are more structural and critical and which together contest neoliberal capitalism’s dominant narrative. Training (which is accomplished through the creation of training institutes that act as spaces for intensive participatory education), is a way to multiply this analysis and knowledge, so that new feminists can use it for change. DAWN publishes a variety of articles, papers and multimedia content, most of which can be found on its website.
