= Banking, Insurance and General Workers Union =

BIGWU
- Banking, Insurance and General Workers Union
- Founded: 1974
- Headquarters: Barataria, Trinidad and Tobago
- Location: Trinidad and Tobago
- Members: Approx 6000 (2006)
- Key people: Don Devenish, President - John Mark Lee Wah, 2nd Vice President
- Affiliations: NATUC; Union Network International
- Website: www.bigwu.org

The Banking, Insurance and General Workers Union (BIGWU) is a trade union in Trinidad and Tobago. It was formed out of a merger between the Bank and General Workers Union and the Bank Employees' Union. The two prior Unions were both formed in 1974.

As its name suggests, most of its members are employed in the finance sector but in particular at the First Citizens Bank, the Republic Bank, the Central Bank of Trinidad and Tobago and credit unions. It is the largest union in finance sector in Trinidad and Tobago.

In 2025, the government and BIGWU, on behalf of the Central Bank employees, negotiated a 6% salary increase for the three year period from 2021 to 2023.

== See also ==
- List of trade unions
