= Lourdes Beneria =

Spanish–American economist

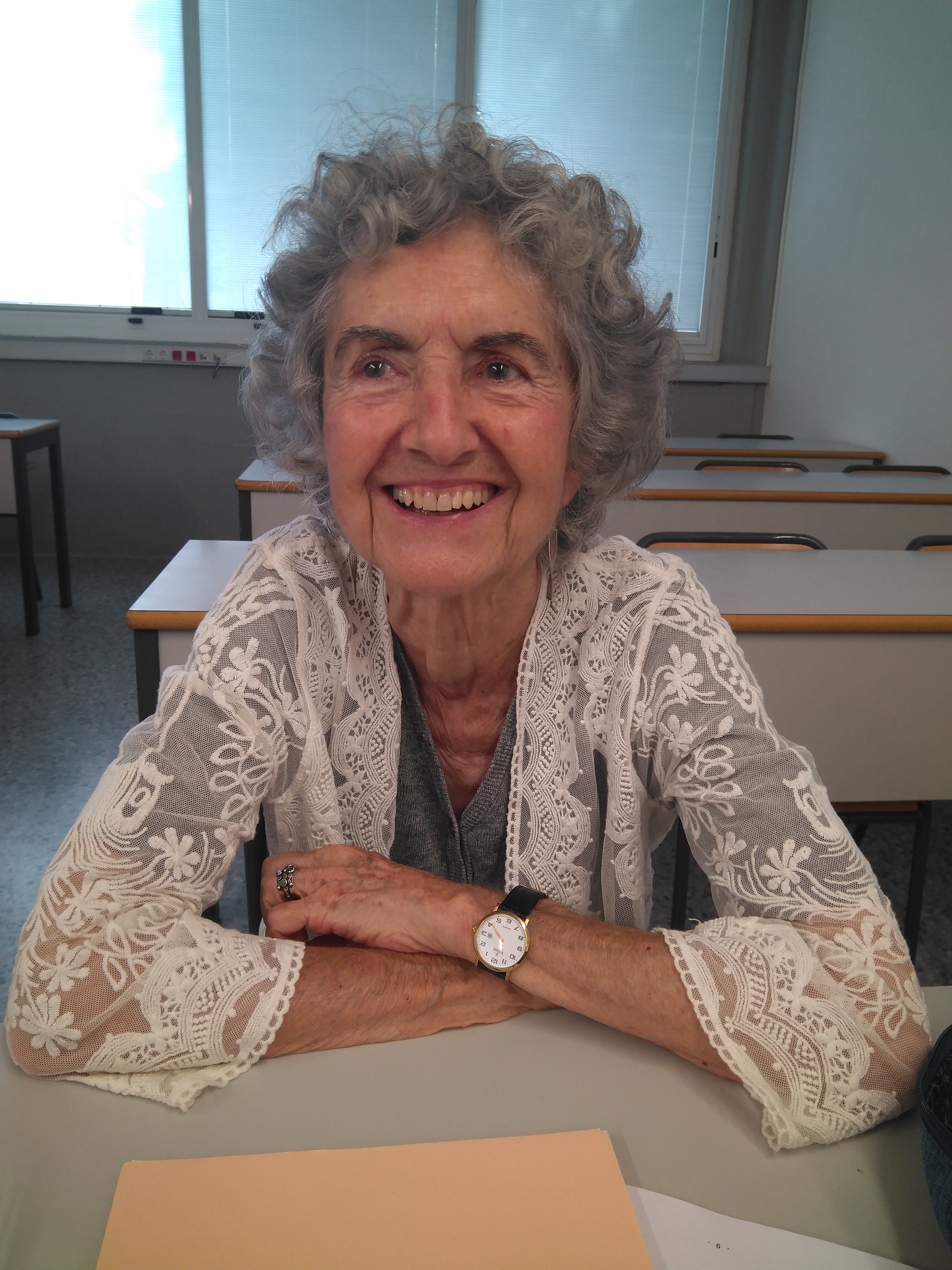
- Born: 1937 (age 88–89); La Vall de Boí, Catalonia, Spain

Academic background
- Education: University of Barcelona; Columbia University

Academic work
- Discipline: Feminist economics
- Institutions: Cornell University

Lourdes Benería (born 1937) is a Spanish–American economist. She was Professor Emerita at Cornell University's Department of City and Regional Planning. The author and editor of many books and articles, her work has concentrated on topics having to do with labor economics, women's work, the informal economy, Gender and development, Latin American Development and globalization. Before Cornell, she taught at Rutgers University and has given courses in other international centers. She worked at the ILO for two years and has collaborated with other UN organizations, such as UNIFEM and UNDP, and with several NGOs. She obtained her PhD at Columbia University in 1975.

In 1987 she acquired a position at Cornell University as Professor Emerita and taught until 2010. She was also the Director of the Gender and Global Change Program, as well as the Latin American studies Program. Beneria spent her academic year between Ithaca and Barcelona as a senior associate member at the Inter-University Institute for the Study of Women and Gender. Her more recent work focused on the feminization of international migration and the care crisis in Europe.

Beneria's work mainly revolved around development issues and on labor markets. In 2007, she was involved in a study of policies that sought to resolve issues regarding family and labor market work in the European Union, specifically in Spain and Latin America. The purpose of the study was to analyze the evolving policies of the labor market conditions in Europe, that were prevailing in developing countries. She collaborated with a UNFPA project that explored the problems faced within the Latin American region and participated in the virtual International Symposium on Gender and Social Cohesion as well.

== Early life ==
Lourdes Benería was born in La Vall de Boí, Lleida, Spain.

== Education ==
Beneria graduated from the University of Barcelona with an undergraduate degree in 1961, a M.Ph. in 1974 and a PhD in economics from Columbia University in 1975.

== Notable ideas ==
Lourdes Beneria, along with other feminists such as Jean Gardiner, Susan Himmelweit, Jane Humphries, Gita Sen, and Maxine Molyneux are credited with starting the conversation to differentiate Marxism from socialist feminism. This idea proposed that Marxism looks at the relationship of gender inequity to capitalism while socialist feminism examines the ways in which work and labor created systemic forces that reinforced patriarchy and white privilege.

== Awards ==
- 2000 Recipient of the Cook Award for work on behalf of women, Cornell University.
- 2002 Narcis Monturiol Prize, for lifetime contributions to scientific work, Department of Culture of the Catalan Government.
- 2016 Medalla al trabajo Presidente Macià y Placa al trabajo Presidente Macià.
- 2017 Isabel de Villena Prize, for contributions to feminist work, Comunitat Valenciana.
- 2018 Creu de Sant Jordi, Generalitat de Catalunya, for lifetime achievements.
- 2021: Doctor Honoris Causa from the University of Lleida, Lleida, Spain
- 2022: Doctor Honoris Causa from the University of Rovira i Virgili, Tarragona, Spain

== Publications ==
=== Books ===
- Benería, Lourdes; Stimpson, Catharine R. (1987). Women, households, and the economy. New Brunswick N.J: Rutgers University Press. ISBN 9780813512648.
- Benería, Lourdes (1982). Women and development - the sexual division of labor in rural societies: a study. New York, N.Y: Praeger. ISBN 9780030618024.
- Benería, Lourdes (1987). The crossroads of class & gender: industrial homework, subcontracting, and household dynamics in Mexico City. Chicago: University of Chicago Press. ISBN 9780226042329.
- Benería, Lourdes; Feldman, Shelley (1992). Unequal burden: economic crises, persistent poverty, and women's work. Boulder: Westview Press. ISBN 9780813382296.
- Benería, Lourdes; Bisnath, Savitri (2001). Gender and development: theoretical, empirical, and practical approaches. Cheltenham, UK Northampton, MA, USA: Edward Elgar Pub. ISBN 9781840641943.
- Benería, Lourdes (2003). Gender, development, and globalization: economics as if all people mattered. New York: Routledge. ISBN 9780415927079.
- Benería, Lourdes; Bisnath, Savitri (2004). Global tensions: challenges and opportunities in the world economy. New York: Routledge. ISBN 9780415934411.
- Benería, Lourdes; May, Ann Mari; Strassmann, Diana L (2011). Feminist economics. Cheltenham, UK Northampton, Massachusetts: Edward Elgar. ISBN 9781843765684.
- Beneria, Lourdes; Berik, Gunseli; Floro, Maria S., Gender, Development and Globalization. Economics as if all people mattered, second edition. New York: Routledge 2016.

=== Chapters in books ===
- Benería, Lourdes (2009), "From "harmony" to "cooperative conflicts": Amartya Sen's contribution to household theory", in Kanbur, Ravi; Basu, Kaushik (eds.), Arguments for a better world: essays in honor of Amartya Sen | Volume II: Society, institutions and development, Oxford New York: Oxford University Press, pp. 202–218, ISBN 9780199239979.

=== Journal articles ===
- Benería, Lourdes (November 1996). "Thou shalt not live by statistics alone, but it might help". Feminist Economics. 2 (3): 139–142. doi:10.1080/13545709610001707856.
- Benería, Lourdes (July 2008). "The crisis of care, international migration, and public policy". Feminist Economics. 14 (3): 1–21. doi:10.1080/13545700802081984. S2CID 216643334.
- Benería, Lourdes; Sen, Gita (Spring 1982). "Class and Gender Inequalities and Women's Role in Economic Development: Theoretical and Practical Implications". Feminist Studies. 8 (1): 157–176. doi:10.2307/3177584. JSTOR 3177584.

== See also ==
- Feminist economics
- List of feminist economists
- Gita Sen

Non-profit organisation positions
Preceded by Nancy Folbre	President of the International Association for Feminist Economics; 2003–2004	Succeeded by Bina Agarwal
