= Steel Workers Union of Trinidad and Tobago =

Workers union

SWUTT
- Steel Workers Union of Trinidad and Tobago
- Headquarters: #115 Southern Main Road - California, Trinidad and Tobago
- Location: Trinidad and Tobago
- Affiliations: JTUM, NATUC, IndustriALL

The Steel Workers Union of Trinidad and Tobago (S.W.U.T.T.) is a trade union in Trinidad and Tobago. The SWUTT is the recognized majority union in the ArcelorMittal Point Lisas steelworks, Tubecity I.M.S., Centrin Steel Company and National Flour Mills (monthly paid workers).

== See also ==
- List of trade unions
