= Caribbean Union of Teachers =

CUT
- Caribbean Union of Teachers
- Headquarters: Castries, St. Lucia
- Location: Caribbean
- Website: Caribbean Union of Teachers

The Caribbean Union of Teachers (CUT) is a federation of teaching trade unions in the Caribbean. Its affiliated unions are:

- Anguilla Teachers Union
- Antigua & Barbuda Union of Teachers
- Bahamas Educators Managerial Union
- Bahamas Union of Teachers
- Barbados Secondary Teachers Union
- Barbados Union of Teachers
- Belize National Teachers Union
- Bermuda Union of Teachers
- British Virgin Islands Teachers Union
- Dominica Association of Teachers
- Grenada Union of Teachers
- Guyana Teachers' Union
- Jamaica Teachers Association
- Montserrat Union of Teachers
- Nevis Teachers Union
- St. Kitts Teachers Union
- St. Lucia Teachers Union
- St. Vincent & the Grenadines Teachers Union
- Syndicat Des Enseignants (Martinique)
- Syndicat national de l'enseignement secondaire SNES (Martinique)
- Trinidad and Tobago Unified Teachers Association
- Windward Islands Teachers Union

== See also ==
- List of trade unions
