= La Brea (parliamentary constituency) =

Trinidad and Tobago parliamentary constituency

- Constituency for the House of Representatives
- La Brea is number 40 on this map
- Electorate: 25,197 (2015)
- Major settlements: La Brea

Current constituency
- Created: 1961
- Number of members: 1
- Member of Parliament: Clyde Elder (UNC)

La Brea is a parliamentary constituency in Trinidad and Tobago.

== Geography ==
The constituency covers the town of La Brea. It had an electorate of 25,197 as of 2015.

== Members ==
Election	Member	Party	Notes
1961	Alexander Chamberlain Alexis	PNM	
1966	Alexander Chamberlain Alexis	PNM	
1971	Alexander Chamberlain Alexis	PNM	
1976	Ian Anthony	PNM	
1981	Ian Anthony	PNM	
1986	Albert Richards	NAR	
1991	Hedwige S. K. Bereaux	PNM	
1995	Hedwige S. K. Bereaux	PNM	
2000	Hedwige S. K. Bereaux	PNM	
2001	Hedwige S. K. Bereaux	PNM	
2002	Hedwige S. K. Bereaux	PNM	
2007	Fitzgerald Jeffrey	PNM	
2010	Fitzgerald Jeffrey	PNM	
2015	Nicole Thora Olivierre	PNM	
2020	Stephen McClashie	PNM	
2025	Clyde Elder	UNC	

== Elections ==
2025 Trinidad and Tobago general election: La Brea
Party	Candidate	Votes	%	±%
UNC	Clyde Elder	7,001	50.1%	▲
PNM	Randall Mitchell	6,262	45.3%	▼
PF	Carla Garcia	413	4.0%	Steady
All People's Party (Trinidad and Tobago)	Renision Jeffrey	53	0.4%	Steady
The Hyarima Movement	Francis Morean	24	0.2%	Steady
Majority		739	4.8%	▲
Turnout		13,824	51.94%	
Registered electors		26,616		
UNC gain from PNM		Swing	%	
