= Alison Prentice =

Canadian historian and women's studies scholar

Alison Leeds Prentice
- Born: July 8, 1934; Delaware
- Died: June 25, 2021 (aged 86); Victoria, British Columbia
- Occupation: Feminist History Professor
- Known for: Member of the Order of Canada

Alison Leeds Prentice (July 8, 1934 – June 25, 2021) was a Canadian historian and a member of the Order of Canada.

Prentice was born in Delaware, in 1934, and immigrated to Canada in 1939. She spent the rest of her childhood in Canada, and earned her Bachelor, Masters and PhD from the University of Toronto. She became a Canadian citizen in 1959.

Prentice founded and was the first director of the Centre for Women's Studies in Education at the Ontario Institute for Studies in Education.

She earned her PhD from the University of Toronto in 1972, and was recognized with honorary doctorates from the University of Guelph and the University of Western Ontario, in 1993 and 1997. In 1998, the year she retired from the University of Toronto, the Ontario Historical Society created an award in her name for the best book on Women's History, and she became a member of the Royal Society of Canada. In 2013, she became a member of the Order of Canada.

In 2025, Alice Leeds Prentice’s grandson’s ex-wife, Michelle Prentice, alleged in an open letter that Alison knew that her son, Doug Prentice, was a serial child molester and that she had paid bribes to the families of victims to cover this up. Doug Prentice has now pleaded guilty to charges relating to some of the allegations made by Michelle Prentice.
