= Sistren Theatre Collective =

- Founded: 1977
- Founders: Honor Ford-Smith and others
- Type: Community theatre group
- Purpose: Women's issues, labor issues, social justice
- Location: Kingston, Jamaica

The Sistren Theatre Collective, established in 1977, is a Jamaican community theatre group, whose work has been widely influential throughout the Caribbean. Their dramaturgy tends to focus on the oppression of women, on poverty, and race and imperialism.

== Founding and activism ==
The Collective was founded in Kingston in 1977. The group was formed out of a Jamaican government programme to help impoverished populations improve their job skills. Assisted by playwright and actor Honor Ford-Smith, the Collective performed their first play, Downpression Get a Blow, for a 1977 national worker's festival. The play was about conditions in a women's garment factory and the struggle to unionize against management opposition. Downpression Get a Blow established the Sistren Theatre Collective's focus on women's and labour issues.

The term Sistren was chosen as a name for the group because it means "sisters" or "sisterhood", and is particularly associated with Jamaica's rasta culture.

Ford-Smith served as the Collective's first artistic director, but other founding members include: Vivette Lewis, Cerene Stephenson, Lana Finikin, Pauline Crawford, Beverley Hanson, Jasmine Smith, Lorna Burrell Haslam, Beverley Elliot, Jerline Todd, Lillian Foster, May Thompson, Rebecca Knowles, and Barbara Gayles. Most of these founding members were working-class single mothers.

Through the 1980s and 1990s, the Collective developed over a dozen plays and toured throughout the Caribbean, the U.S., and Europe. In 1985, Sistren members, directed the documentary Sweet Sugar Rage. In the film, the troupe uses their methods of theatre and improvisation to present the exploitation of women’s labor in Jamaica’s sugar cane fields. They also ran workshops and programmes to promote awareness of women's issues and the arts.

Today, the Collective runs education programmes promoting education on women's and gender issues, grassroots activism and art, building regional networks, and campaigning for social change. Sistren serves adults, youth, and children in communities across Jamaica and the Caribbean.

In promoting their social and economic justice initiatives, the Collective has worked with the Ministry of Health, UNICEF local office, Christian Aid, Global Fund, Global Board of Ministries, and United Church of Canada. From 1996 to the present they have run a Gender Justice-HIV/AIDS programme in both rural and urban communities. Other causes include family therapy, a Male Leadership Development programme, and a youth-centred Forum on Gang Violence.

== Themes, style and language ==
Much of the Collective's theatre work is rooted in their experiences as black Caribbean women, exploring the intersections between the patriarchal oppression of women, racism, and social class. Some of their most important thematic interests include: unemployment, domestic violence, alcoholism, harassment in the workplace, poverty and class oppression, racism, imperialism, sexism and women's social roles, and child-rearing and pregnancy.

Many of the Collective's plays utilize Brechtian alienation to encourage audiences to critically understand how a particular situation came into being and how it might be improved. Ford-Smith explained that this style attempts to facilitate "change or consolidation through the revelation and understanding of forms of oppression and exploitation, forms of affirmation and celebration."

Jamaican performance, aesthetics, and folk culture are major influence on the Collective's work. Inspired by Caribbean playwrights and artists like Dennis Scott, the Collective utilizes songs, games, rituals, folklore, African stories, reggae, and other elements of Jamaican popular culture in their plays. Performances often rely heavily on dance, mime, and ritual. Nana Yah, about Jamaica's legendary heroine Nanny, is performed with a series of twelve vignettes or scenes, some of which include no dialogue but rely entirely on visual and musical performance. Jamaican reggae has been incorporated into musical plays like Muffet Inna All A We, which adapts the Little Miss Muffet nursery rhyme and the West African and Caribbean Anansi legends to critique international capitalism and consumer culture's affects on working-class women.

Oral traditions and culture play a major role in the Sistren's performances, and more than many other Caribbean theatre artists the Collective incorporates Jamaican patois, the language of most black Jamaicans. Inspired in part by Louise Bennett, the Collective uses the rhythms, patterns, and structures of everyday speech to address popular audiences apart from typical middle-class theatre-goers. However, the Collective often uses linguistic differences, especially between patois and standard English, to signal social class or social class pretensions.

== Improvisation and play-making process ==
Many of the Collective's early plays were developed out of loose improvisations based on the members' life experiences, including the early play Bellywoman Bangarang, about pregnancy. However, as the Collective developed, they began incorporating more outside sources, including archival material and interviews with women who had experienced the situations being dramatized in the plays. However, improvisation remains an important element in the Collective's production process, allowing an organic and democratic development of material.

Over time, the Collective developed a flexible but regular process, which has become highly influential with community theatres throughout the Caribbean. They select a topic and a community, then collect as much material as possible with which to begin developing ideas. The researched material is molded through a workshop process involving games, improvisation, role-playing, and free form exploration. These free-flowing techniques eventually coalesce into a rough storyline, which is then transcribed into a skeleton script. One important aspect of the Sistren Theatre Collective's process is that they take the working script back to the community where the play is being set to gather input from those whose stories are being told. "Witnessing", or listening to personal testimony, is an important element of Jamaican culture and has influenced both Sistren's production process and their dramaturgy.

== Awards and initiatives ==
The play QPH won a National Theatre Critics Award. The play reflects many of the Sistren Theatre Collective's dominant themes. It memorializes 167 women killed in a 1980 Kingston Alms House fire. The name QPH comes from the specific focus on characters Queenie, Pearlie, and Hopie, who are impoverished despite lifetimes of trying to survive economically as independent women. QPH uses the African Etu ritual, which is practised in Jamaica, to resurrect the dead women to perform fragments of their lives.

The Collective's anti-violence campaigns have been widely recognized. Along with five other NGOs, the Sistren contracted with the Ministry of National Security for the Citizen Security and Justice Programme (CSJP), an initiative to reduce violence in Jamaica. They also partnered with several other organizations on the JSIF Inner City Basic Services Project, led by the Dispute Resolution Foundation. Sistren received a UNHABITAT "Certificate of Recognition for Excellence in Urban Safety, Crime Prevention and Youth" in 2008.

== Plays ==
- Downpression Get a Blow (1977)
- Bellywoman Bangarang (1978)
- Nana Yah (1980)
- QPH (1981)
- Domestik (1982)
- Muffet Inna All A We (1985)
