= Bank and General Workers Union =

Organization

The Bank and General Workers Union (BGWU), formerly Bank Workers Trade Union (BWTU), a former trade union in Trinidad and Tobago, was formed on 17 April 1974 and represented workers in over 60 companies, including all the workers at the Central Bank of Trinidad and Tobago. It merged with the Bank Employees' Union on 21 February 2003 to form the Banking, Insurance and General Workers Union.

== See also ==
- List of trade unions
