= Rhoda Reddock =

Trinidadian educator and activist (born 1953)

- Born: Rhoda Elizabeth Reddock; 7 June 1953 (age 73); Kingstown, Saint Vincent and the Grenadines
- Education: University of the West Indies
- Occupations: educator, women's rights and social activist
- Years active: 1980–present
- Known for: Gender studies

Rhoda Reddock (born 7 June 1953) is a Trinidadian educator and social activist. She has served as founder, chair, adviser, or member of several organizations, such as the Caribbean Association for Feminist Research and Action (CAFRA), the Global Fund for Women, and the Regional Advisory Committee of the Global Coalition on Women and AIDS established by UNAIDS. In 2002 she received the Seventh CARICOM Triennial Award for Women, was Trinidad and Tobago's nominee for the International Women of Courage Award in 2008, and was honoured in her country's National Honour Awards ceremony in 2012 with the Gold Medal for the Development of Women.

In June 2018, Reddock was the first-ever from Trinidad and Tobago to be elected with the highest number of votes among the candidates to serve on the United Nations Committee on the Elimination of Discrimination against Women (CEDAW) for the term 2019 to 2022.

In 2022, Reddock was re-elected to serve on the Committee on the Elimination of All Forms of Discrimination Against Women (CEDAW). She currently serves as the Vice Chair of the Committee on the Elimination of All Forms of Discrimination Against Women that is based in Geneva, Switzerland.

== Early life ==
Rhoda Elizabeth Reddock was born on 7 June 1953 in Kingstown, on Saint Vincent, the largest island of Saint Vincent and the Grenadines to Rosa and Bertram Reddock. Her mother was a teacher and her father served as an agricultural officer and adviser to local farmers. She attended primary school at Kingstown Preparatory School on Saint Vincent, before her family relocated in 1960 to Trinidad. Completing her primary education at Eastern Girls Primary School in Port of Spain, Reddock furthered her education at Bishop Anstey High School. Enrolling at the University of the West Indies (UWI) in 1971, she went on to earn a Bachelor of Science in social administration in 1975, after completing studies at both the St. Augustine and Mona campuses.

Furthering her education, Reddock moved to the Netherlands and earned a master's degree from the International Institute of Social Studies in The Hague in 1980. She then enrolled in applied sociology at the University of Amsterdam and completed her PhD in 1985, before returning to Trinidad. While she was working on her graduate studies, Reddock compiled the work of Clotil Walcott, a Trinidadian labour leader, into a booklet Fight Back Say a Woman and secured publishing for it in The Hague. Inviting Walcott to participate in the International Wages for Housework Campaign (IWFH) in 1980, Reddock facilitated the international ties that would spur Walcott into her work with the United Nations.

== Career ==
In 1985, Reddock began working as a research fellow at UWI in the Institute for Social and Economic Research and pressed for the development of a gender studies programme for UWI. She became a lecturer in the sociology department in 1990 and continued her research until 1993. The following year, she became the head of a new programme, the Centre for Gender and Development Studies in St. Augustine. That same year, Reddock published Women, Labour and Politics in Trinidad and Tobago, which was followed two years later by Ethnic Minorities in Caribbean Society. She has served on the Executive Council and Advisory Board of the Caribbean Studies Association and as a member of the Latin American Studies Association. She is an international member of the American Sociological Association.

As a researcher, her work has focused on gender and sexuality in the Caribbean, the history of the Caribbean women’s movement, labour and work, and the effects of gender and race on citizenship. She has studied Indo-Caribbean populations and the manner in which colonialism, traditional class structures and the struggle for economic survival effected men and women differently. Her work on the history of activism in the Caribbean has shed light on how women initiated the move toward democratization from both political and labour perspectives, linking feminist goals and nationalist movements.

In addition to her academic pursuits, Reddock has maintained a presence in the fight for social parity and justice. She attended both the Fourth World Conference on Women in 1985 held in Nairobi, Kenya, and the Fifth World Conference on Women in 1995 in Beijing, China. She was one of the founders, and served as first chair of the Caribbean Association for Feminist Research and Action (CAFRA), as well as a founder of the Caribbean Network on Studies of Masculinity. Reddock led research on a national initiative on child abuse which has been expanded into a region-wide programme and is supported by UNICEF. She spent two years working on a National Gender Policy with Camille Antoine and Patricia Mohammed, that was not adopted, but which Reddock still hopes will gain traction.

Reddock's activism and dedication to academics has been recognized on a national and international level. She was a recipient of the Rockefeller Residency Fellowship at Hunter College in 1992. In 2001, she received UWI's Vice-Chancellor’s Award for Excellence in Teaching and Administration, Research and Public Service. Reddock was the 2002 recipient of the Seventh CARICOM Triennial Award for Women and in 2008 was Trinidad's nominee for the International Women of Courage Award. In 2012, she was presented with an honorary doctorate from South Africa′s University of the Western Cape. Later that same year, at Trinidad and Tobago′s National Honours ceremony, Reddock was the recipient of the Gold Medal for the Development of Women.
