= World Summit for Social Development =

1995 Conference

The World Summit for Social Development was a conference held in Copenhagen from 6–12 March 1995. It aimed to "establish a people-centered framework for social development, to build a culture of cooperation and partnership and to respond to the immediate needs of those who are most affected by human distress."

Organisations whose representatives addressed the summit included Grameen Bank, Soroptimist International, and Rotary International.
