= Federation of Independent Trade Unions and Non-Governmental Organisations =

FITUN
- Federation of Independent Trade Unions and Non-Governmental Organisations
- Founded: 2000
- Headquarters: San Fernando, Trinidad and Tobago
- Location: Trinidad and Tobago
- Key people: David Abdullah, President
- Affiliations: None

Arising out of the 2000 Convention of NATUC, the main national trade union centre in Trinidad and Tobago, divisions took place which resulted in the formation of the Federation of Independent Trade Unions and Non-Governmental Organisations (FITUN). FITUN is not affiliated to any organisation.

== Affiliated Unions ==
Those Unions affiliated to FITUN include:

- Communication Workers Union (Trinidad and Tobago)
- Oilfields Workers' Trade Union

== See also ==
- List of trade unions
- List of federations of trade unions
