= Transnational feminist network =

A transnational feminist network (TFN) is a network of feminist organizations and activists that coordinates collective action across national borders. Such networks address issues including women's rights, economic policy, reproductive rights, peace, environmental justice and gender equality. They became increasingly prominent during the 1980s and 1990s alongside globalization, the expansion of international civil society, and United Nations conferences on women.

== Globalization ==
TFNs are similar to non-governmental organizations (NGOs) but while NGOs work at a local and national level, TFNs create coalitions across borders. Globalization affects women worldwide in adverse ways and TFNs emerged in response to these effects. Feminism is best understand as a global phenomenon as it is a product of transnational dialogues and disagreements.

As mentioned by Myra Ferree and Aili Tripp, "Globalization has facilitated the emergence of feminism as a goal in a wide variety of issue advocacy at the transnational level" (Ferree & Tripp 12).

According to Johanna Brenner in her article Transnational Feminism and the Struggle for Global Justice:

"Economic insecurity and impoverishment, exposure to toxics, degradation of water, high infant and maternal mortality rates, forced migration, increased hours spent in paid and unpaid work are only some of the indicates [sic] of women's burdens worldwide"

Brenner also states that:

"[t]hird world governments are male-dominated, often inefficient, plagued by cronyism, and sometimes corrupt; and the pressures of structural adjustment programs imposed on them by the International Monetary Fund (IMF) and the World Bank have certainly aggravated these tendencies" (Brenner 78).

Programs like Structural Adjustment Programs (SAPs) are part of the package of globalization that is presented to other countries; and while such programs are portrayed as being valuable to improve the status of a country, they result in creating worse situations for the peoples of a country.

== Aims ==
Transnational Feminist Networks can be divided into different categories based on their goals. Some of these include Advocacy for Women's Human Rights, Peace, Anti-militarism, Conflict Resolution, Ending Violence Against Women and Reproductive and Health Rights.

=== Response to globalization ===
Women's groups form in response to the negative effects of globalization and TFNs emerge when these women's groups come together to resolve shared issues. These groups work with one another across borders and they recognize their differences but also discover their similarities and form strong coalition's bases on these similarities. In describing a conference held by the International Network of Women's Studies Journals, Tahera Aftab relayed that:

"the objective of the INWSJ conference was to set up a network for interdisciplinary feminist and women's studies journals with a focus on the development and inclusion of a transnational feminist understanding of women's development issues…"

Just as these academics worked to reach consensus on issues, so do women's groups who form TFNs. Valentine Mogadam best describes TFNs in her book Globalizing Women: Transnational Feminist Networks. She states in her text:

"TFN's have arisen in the context of economic, political, and cultural globalization—and they are tackling both the particularistic and the hegemonic trends of globalization. They are advancing criticisms of inequalities and forms of oppression, neoliberal economic policies, unsustainable economic growth and consumption, and patriarchal controls over women. In a word, transnational feminist networks are the organizational expression of the transnational women's movement, or global feminism" (Moghadam 104).

=== Women's human rights and security ===
Another widespread aim of transnational feminist networks is to create a stronger sense of global human security while building peace. McKay argues that women and girls perspectives are a necessary component in developing programs and policies. There is a difference in the way men and women experience security and TNF's have a role in amplifying the women's perspectives to be acted upon. In specific, Woroniuk states that dimensions of women's security include "(1) violence against women, (2) gender inequality in control over resources, (3) gender inequality in power and decision making, (4) women's human rights, and (5) women (and men) as actors, not victims." These areas are taken into account in TFN's approach to policy changes and public awareness.

== Outcomes ==
In 1995 the United Nations held the Fourth World Conference on women that was dedicated towards creating an approach to the marginalization of women. The outcome was a "gendering of the agenda" for other conferences worldwide, which included a focus on gender neutral approaches and prioritizing women's rights in policy making.

TNF's response to world events can have a strong impact on the actions of governments and societies. An example of such was when the Taliban took control of Afghanistan in 1996 and a harsher regime threatened women's security and rights. Pressure put on governments from feminists around the world resulted in an isolation of the Taliban and an importance placed on Afghan women's rights.

== Examples ==
A few TFNs:

- Sisterhood Is Global Institute (SIGI),
- Women Learning Partnership for Rights, Development, and Peace (WLP),
- Women Living Under Muslim Laws (WLUML) (https://web.archive.org/web/20091029172850/http://www.wluml.org/), and
- Association for Women's Rights in Development (AWID) (http://www.awid.org).
- Center for Women's Global Leadership (CWGL)
- Women's Alliance for Development (WAD)
