= Caribbean Public Services Association =

CPSA
- Caribbean Public Services Association
- Founded: 1970
- Location: Caribbean
- Key people: Thomas Letang, General Secretary

The Caribbean Public Services Association is a regional trade union federation of public services trade unions in the Caribbean. Founded in 1970, it was previously the Federation of British Caribbean Civil Service Association.

The 2023 annual conference of the Association was attended by unions from 13 Caribbean countries.
