= Randall Mitchell =

Trinidad and Tobago politician

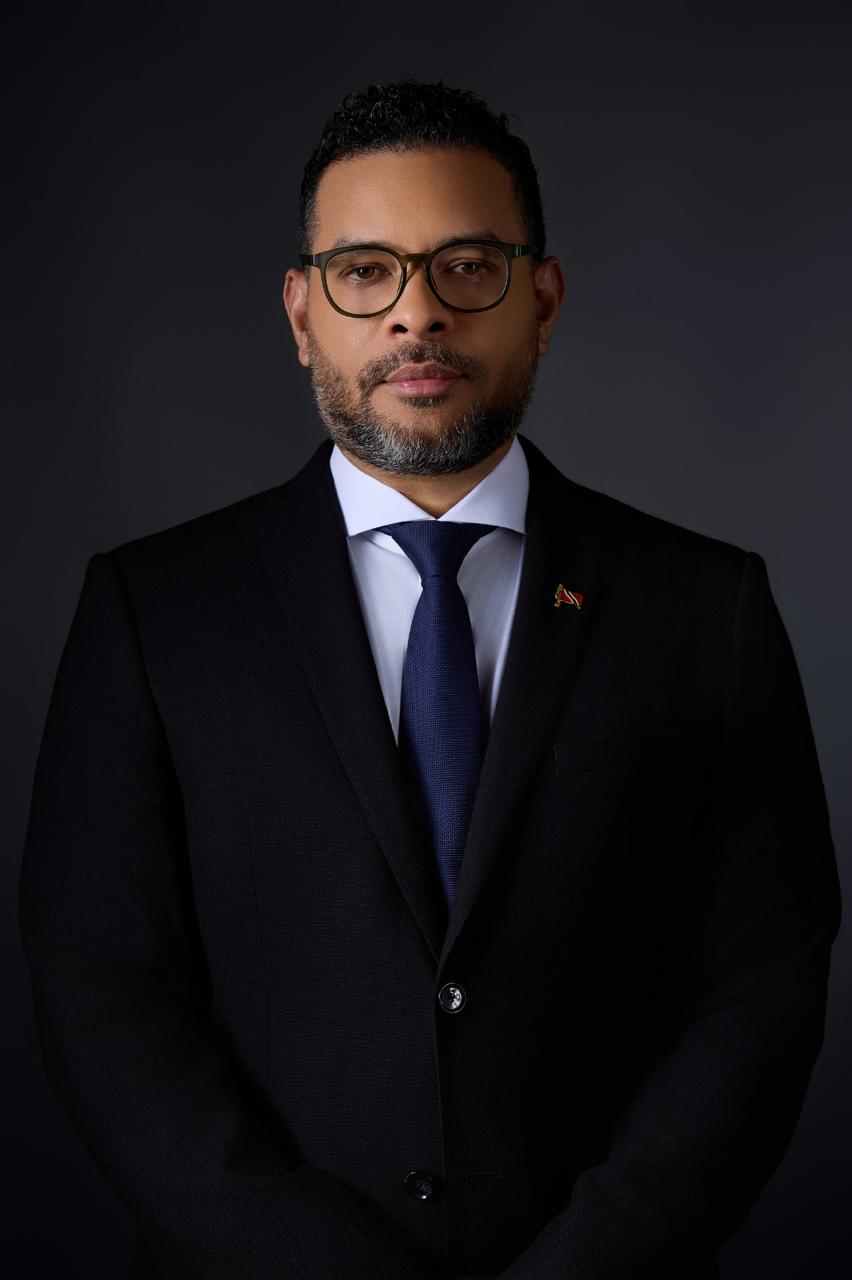

Minister of Tourism, Culture and the Arts Government Senator, 12th Republican Parliament, Trinidad and Tobago

Personal details
- Born: Randall Seth Mitchell; January 10, 1979 (age 47) San Fernando, Trinidad and Tobago
- Children: 3
- Parent(s): Victor Mitchell and Valarie Mitchell
- Education: Presentation College, San Fernando, San Fernando Boys' R.C. Primary School
- Alma mater: University of the West Indies University of Northumbria University of London
- Profession: Attorney-at-Law
- Awards: Buchanan Prize, The Honourable Society of Lincolns Inn (Best Overall BVC student, Northumbria University)

Randall Mitchell (born 10 January 1979) is a politician and lawyer in Trinidad and Tobago who has served as the Minister of Tourism, Culture and the Arts since 19 August 2020. He first entered Parliament as the elected representative for San Fernando East in the 11th Republican Parliament (2015). He was appointed a senator in the Trinidad and Tobago Senate on 19 August 2020. He is a member of the People's National Movement.

Mitchell was first elected to represent the San Fernando East constituency on 7 September 2015. As a member of the Trinidad and Tobago Parliament and then as a senator with the ruling government, he held a number of ministerial positions. During the 11th Parliament, Mitchell also served as an active member of several committees, such as the Public Accounts Committee; Joint Standing Committees on National Security, Finance and Legal Affairs, and Human Rights and Diversity; Joint Select Committee on the Family and Children Division Bill, 2016; and the Special Select Committee for the Nomination of a Commissioner of Police and Deputy Commissioner of Police.

== Early life ==
Mitchell was born in San Fernando, Trinidad and Tobago on 10 January 1978. His parents raised him with his three brothers in Cocoyea, a neighborhood within San Fernando.

== Education ==
Mitchell attended elementary school at San Fernando Boys R.C. until 1991. He later attended Presentation College in San Fernando, where he was an avid sportsman, representing his alma mater in football and badminton.

He received his first post-secondary education from the University of London in 2007 and earned a Bachelor of Law degree. He then attended the University of Northumbria, where he graduated with a Master of Laws. At the University of Northumbria, he won the Buchanan Prize (Best Overall BVC student) of Lincoln's Inn for 2007–2008. In 2017, he graduated with a Distinction in the International Master of Business Administration from the Arthur Lok Jack Global School of Business, University of the West Indies.

== Politics ==
On 11 September 2015, Prime Minister Keith Rowley appointed, Mitchell to be the Minister of Public Administration in the Ministry of Public Administration.

On 18 March 2016, he became Minister of Housing and Urban Development in the Ministry of Housing and Urban Development.

On 9 April 2018, he became Minister of Tourism (later renamed Minister of Tourism, Culture and the Arts) in the Ministry of Tourism Culture and the Arts.

== Electoral history ==
2025 Trinidad and Tobago general election: La Brea
Party	Candidate	Votes	%	±%
UNC	Clyde Elder	7,001	50.1%	▲
PNM	Randall Mitchell	6,262	45.3%	▼
PF	Carla Garcia	413	4.0%	Steady
All People's Party (Trinidad and Tobago)	Renision Jeffrey	53	0.4%	Steady
The Hyarima Movement	Francis Morean	24	0.2%	Steady
Majority		739	4.8%	▲
Turnout		13,824	51.94%	
Registered electors		26,616		
UNC gain from PNM		Swing	%	
