= Stephen McClashie =

Trinidad and Tobago politician

Stephen McClashie is a Trinidad and Tobago politician from the People's National Movement. He was Labour Minister and member of parliament for La Brea.

In December 2024, he was deselected for the 2025 Trinidad and Tobago general election.

== See also ==
- 12th Republican Parliament of Trinidad and Tobago
