= Caribbean Association for Feminist Research and Action =

Women's rights organization

The Caribbean Association for Feminist Research and Action (CAFRA) is a regional feminist network.

The Caribbean Association for Feminist Research and Action (CAFRA) is a nongovernmental organization that advocates for women's rights and empowerment in the Caribbean. The regional network, which serves as an umbrella organization for progressive feminist groups in over a dozen countries, is based in Castries, St. Lucia.

== History ==
CAFRA was founded in Barbados on 2 April 1985. Its founders included Peggy Antrobus, Joan French, Rawwida Baksh, Honor Ford-Smith, Sonia Cuales, and Rhoda Reddock. The organization was formed in response to both the wave of feminist activism in that period and the discomfort some women felt in the leftist political groups of the day. As one of the group's founders wrote in 2007:

"While there was official acceptance of women’s equality in these organisations, they were in actuality patriarchal structures, with strict hierarchies and few women in leadership positions. Feminist-oriented ideas in these spaces were dismissed as ‘bourgeois,’ ‘foreign’ and, as a result, ‘irrelevant’ and potentially divisive."

CAFRA was the first regional women's organization that called itself "feminist". Its most active period was the late 1980s and the 1990s, although it remains a significant player on women's issues in various Caribbean countries.

== Structure ==
CAFRA was based in Trinidad and Tobago for many years and is now based in St. Lucia. Though it is based in the English-speaking Caribbean, it covers all linguistic areas of the region; it is known as the Asociación Caribeña para la Investigación y Acción Feministas in Spanish and the Association Caraïbéenne pour la Recherche et l'Action Féministe in French.

The organization currently includes representatives from 17 constituencies: the Bahamas, Belize, Cuba, Dominica, the Dominican Republic, St. Lucia, Guadeloupe, Guyana, Haiti, Jamaica, Martinique, the Netherlands Antilles, Puerto Rico, St. Vincent, Suriname, Trinidad and Tobago, and the U.S Virgin Islands.

A general meeting is held every three years, with a regional committee and continuation committee that meet annually. It is overseen by a coordinator, of which there have been four in the history of the organization, beginning with Rawwida Baksh. The most recent coordinator is Flavia Cherry.

There is also a CAFRA Youth League, which has branches in various countries.

CAFRA's active membership has primarily been Afro-Caribbean, although its members have worked to include Indo-Caribbean and other perspectives.

== Work ==
CAFRA aims to promote women's ability to effect change in society, to fight oppression, and to "serve as facilitator of the regional women's movement."

Its work has included research and advocacy on violence against women, gender bias, women and the environment, women and agriculture, and women and the law. It has also advocated for sexual and reproductive health rights, although there were previously internal divisions on the issue, as well as LGBT rights. CAFRA has also run donation drives after natural disasters.

It previously published a bilingual magazine, CAFRA News, which launched in 1987.

The organization's cultural efforts include publishing Creation Fire: A CAFRA Anthology of Caribbean Women's Poetry, said to be the first anthology of poetry by Caribbean women, in 1990.

== Notable members ==
- Andaiye (1942–2019): executive member
- Peggy Antrobus (born 1935): co-founder
- Sonia Cuales (1941–2018): co-founder
- Honor Ford-Smith (born 1951): co-founder
- Erin Greene: Bahamas representative and regional chair
- Tara Ramoutar (1953–2020): member of CAFRA Trinidad and Tobago from 1993; leader between 2003 and 2016
- Rhoda Reddock (born 1953): co-founder
- Nelcia Robinson-Hazell: coordinator of CAFRA from 1996 to 2009

== See also ==
- Feminism in the Caribbean
