= Kalapani (Indian expatriates in UK) =

Kalapani refers to the Indians who crossed the sea to live in the UK during the British regime in 18th and 19th century. The process of crossing the seas was called Kalapani and was banned in major Indian religions at that time. Expatriates were mainly sailors and servants who used to live with their British masters. A large number of concubines accompanied their men as well. In most parts, they went in an agreement to come back after a certain period of time which they failed in many cases. Many of them turned into beggars or prostitutes as a result. Later a law was passed to ensure the rights of expatriates.

== Sailors ==
In 1803 there were more than two hundred sailors and by the year 1807, the number crossed over a thousand. Most of them were unable to return for lack of money and many were tortured and even killed by British captains. A company regulation was passed to protect their rights which merely protected them from dangers. Sailors had to escape and live in Britain to avoid death and torture. Despite having higher risks, sailors travelled to the UK for a better living. They were paid significantly higher than the farmers and fishermen.

== Servants ==
Many servants who worked in British families living in India went to live with their masters in Britain. Revealing from their names it is found out that most of them were Muslims. They came basically from the Northern and Western part of India.

== Munshi ==
Sailing was not prohibited in Islam and many Muslims went to the UK as a result. Some Muslim people called "Munshi" went to Britain and taught Arabic and Persian language to British people who intended to come to India for service or business.

== See also ==
- Sake Dean Mahomet
- Itesham Uddin
