= Honor Ford-Smith =

Jamaican writer and actor (born 1951)

- Born: Honor Maria Ford-Smith; 1951 (age 74–75); Montreal, Quebec, Canada
- Occupations: Actress, playwright, scholar and poet
- Known for: Co-founder of Sistren Theatre Collective

Honor Maria Ford-Smith (born 1951 in Montreal, Quebec) is a Jamaican actress, playwright, scholar, and poet. The daughter of a brown Jamaican mother and an English father, Ford-Smith is sometimes described as "Jamaica white," signalling a person of mixed race who appears white.

== Career ==
Ford-Smith, who studied theatre at the University of Wisconsin–Madison, was a co-founder and artistic director of Sistren Theatre Collective, a community theatre group of working-class Jamaican women established in 1977. Sistren created its own plays collaboratively, and performed in Jamaica and abroad; the group also worked extensively in community theatre and popular education, particularly around issues affecting women. Sistren played a leading role in the Caribbean women's movement, providing feminist analysis of women's issues in Jamaica and entering into transnational alliances with women's organizations in the Caribbean region, North America, the UK, and Europe. In 1985, as a member of Sistren, she directed the documentary Sweet Sugar Rage. In the film, the troupe uses their methods of theatre and improvisation to present the exploitation of women's labor in Jamaica's sugar cane fields.

Ford-Smith was also a member of the Groundwork Theatre Company, created in 1980 as the repertory arm of the Jamaica School of Drama; it became an autonomous company in 1987.

She edited and contributed to Sistren's book Lionheart Gal: Life Stories of Jamaican Women, published in 1986 and re-issued, with a new afterword by Ford-Smith, in 2005. Her collection of poems, My Mother's Last Dance, appeared in 1996. Among her many theatre projects have been a dramatic adaptation of My Mother's Last Dance, and Just Jazz, an adaptation of Jean Rhys's 1962 short story "Let Them Call It Jazz". Ford-Smith is a founding mother of the Caribbean Association for Feminist Research and Action (CAFRA).

Ford-Smith moved to Toronto in 1991, receiving her doctorate in education from the University of Toronto in 2004. She continues to write, to work in theatre and to teach in Toronto.

She teaches at York University in Toronto under the Faculty of Environmental & Urban Change.
