= List of cities and towns in Trinidad and Tobago =

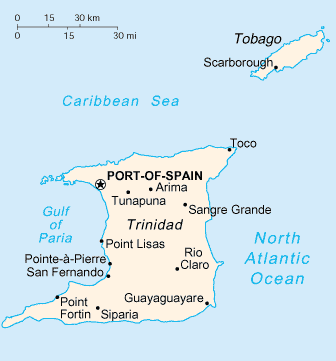
Map of Trinidad and Tobago

List of cities, towns, settlements, and villages in Trinidad and Tobago:

== Largest ==
Largest cities or towns in Trinidad and Tobago 2011 Census*
Rank	Name	Municipality	Pop.	Rank	Name	Municipality	Pop.
1	Chaguanas	Borough of Chaguanas	101,297	11	Sangre Grande	Region of Sangre Grande	20,630
2	San Fernando	City of San Fernando	82,997	12	Penal	Region of Penal–Debe	17,952
3	Port of Spain	City of Port of Spain	81,142	13	Scarborough	Tobago	17,537
4	Arima	The Royal Chartered Borough of Arima	65,623	14	Gasparillo	Region of Couva–Tabaquite–Talparo	16,426
5	San Juan	Region of San Juan–Laventille	53,588	15	Siparia	Borough of Siparia	14,535
6	Diego Martin	Borough of Diego Martin	49,686	16	Claxton Bay	Region of Couva–Tabaquite–Talparo	14,436
7	Couva	Region of Couva–Tabaquite–Talparo	48,858	17	Fyzabad	Borough of Siparia	13,099
8	Point Fortin	Republic Borough of Point Fortin	29,579	18	Valencia	Region of Sangre Grande	12,327
9	Princes Town	Region of Princes Town	28,335	19	Freeport	Region of Couva–Tabaquite–Talparo	11,850
10	Tunapuna	Region of Tunapuna–Piarco	26,829	20	Debe	Region of Penal–Debe	11,733

== A ==
Name	Location (Region/municipality)
Aranguez	San Juan–Laventille
Argyle-Kendal	Tobago
Arima	Borough of Arima
Arena	Couva-Tabaquite-Talparo
Arnos Vale	Tobago
Arouca	Tunapuna–Piarco
Arquart (Aquat, Aquart, or Urquart) Village	Penal–Debe
Auchenskeoch	Tobago
Auzonville	Tunapuna–Piarco
Avocat	Siparia

== B ==
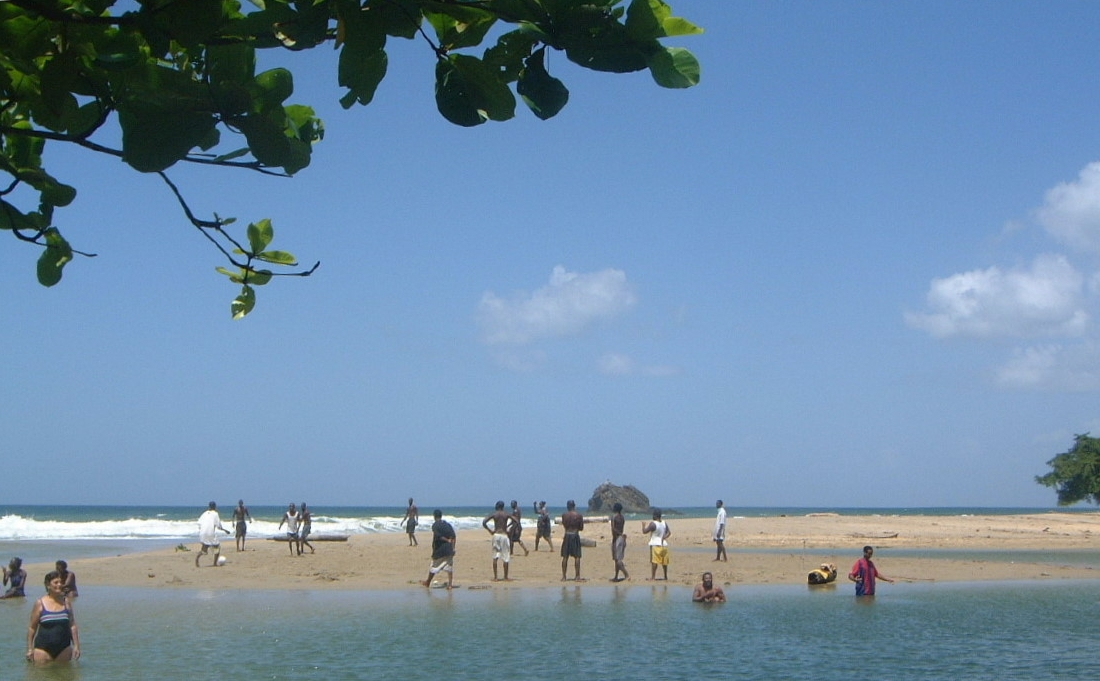
Blanchisseuse beach

Name	Location (Region/municipality)
Bacolet	Tobago
Balmain	Couva–Tabaquite–Talparo
Bamboo (No. 1 & No. 3)	San Juan–Laventille
Bamboo No. 2	Tunapuna–Piarco
Bangladesh	Tunapuna–Piarco
Barataria	San Juan–Laventille
Barrackpore	Penal–Debe
Basta Hall	Couva–Tabaquite–Talparo
Beetham Estate Gardens	Port of Spain
Bethel	Tobago
Belle Gardens	Tobago
Belmont	Port of Spain
Ben Lomond	Couva–Tabaquite–Talparo
Biche	Rio Claro–Mayaro
Black Rock	Tobago
Blanchisseuse	Tunapuna–Piarco
Bloody Bay	Tobago
Boissiere Village	Diego Martin region
Bon Accord	Tobago
Bon Air Development	Tunapuna–Piarco
Bonne Aventure	Couva–Tabaquite–Talparo
Bonasse	Siparia region
Borde Narve Village	Princes Town region
Bourg Mulatresse	San Juan–Laventille
Brasso	Couva–Tabaquite–Talparo
Brasso Seco	Tunapuna–Piarco
Brazil	Couva–Tabaquite–Talparo
Brickfield	Couva–Tabaquite–Talparo
Brighton	Siparia region
Buccoo	Tobago
Buen Intento	Princes Town region
Buenos Ayres	Siparia region

== C ==
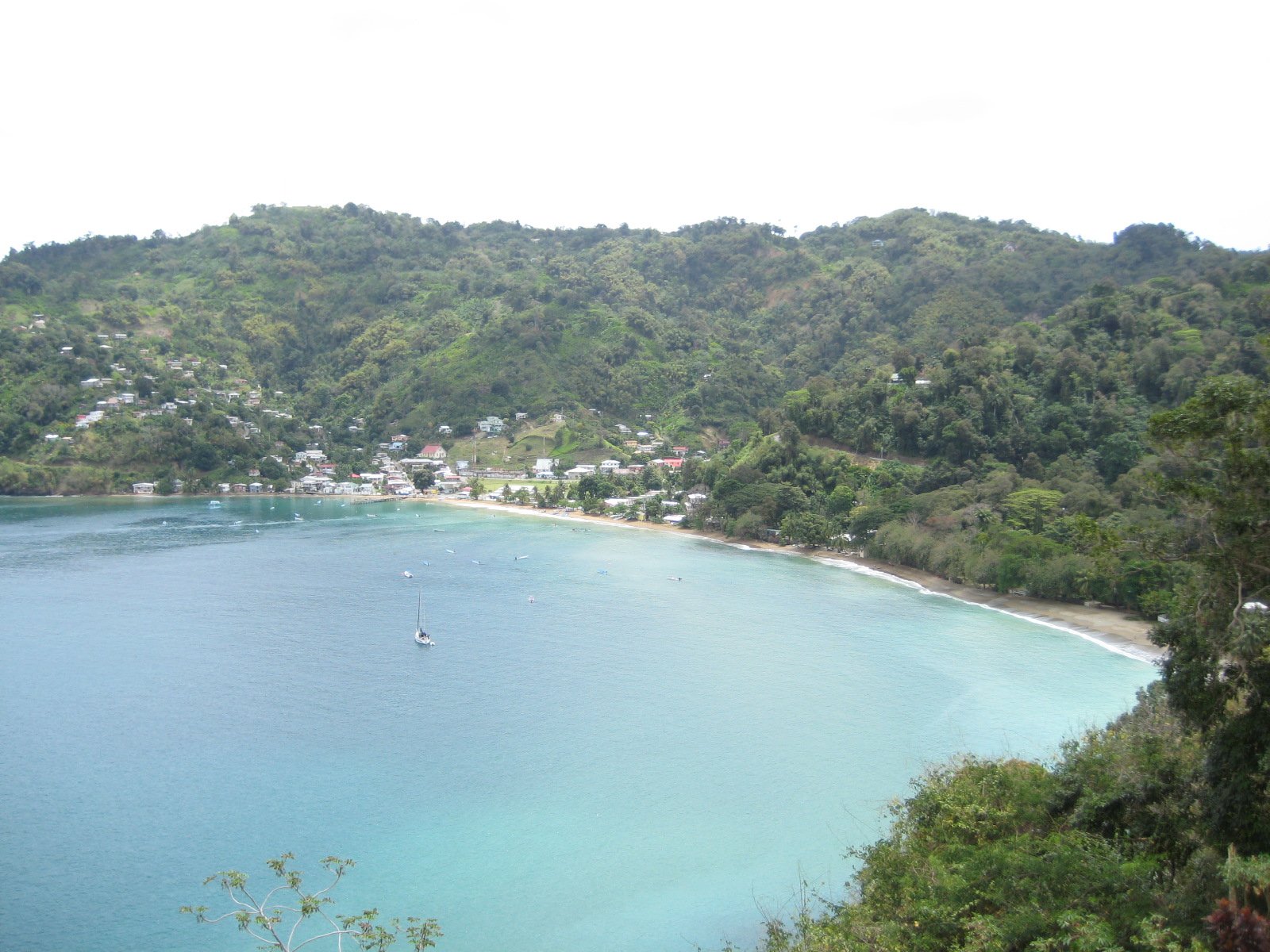
Charlotteville

Name	Location (Region/municipality)
Caigual	Sangre Grande region
Calcutta Settlement	Couva–Tabaquite–Talparo
Calder Hall	Tobago
California	Couva–Tabaquite–Talparo
Campbleton-Charlotteville	Tobago
Canaan, Tobago	Tobago
Canaan, Trinidad	Penal-Debe
Cantaro	San Juan-Laventille
Carapichaima	Couva–Tabaquite–Talparo
Carenage	Diego Martin region
Carli Bay	Couva–Tabaquite–Talparo
Carlsen Field	Couva–Tabaquite–Talparo
Carnbee	Tobago
Cascade	San Juan-Laventille
Castara	Tobago
Caura	Tunapuna-Piarco
Cedar Hill Village	Princes Town region
Cedros	Siparia region
Centeno	Tunapuna-Piarco
Chaguanas	Borough of Chaguanas
Chaguaramas	Diego Martin region
Champs Fleurs	San Juan–Laventille
Chandernagore Village	Couva–Tabaquite–Talparo
Charlotteville	Tobago
Charuma	Mayaro-Rio Claro
Chase Village	Couva–Tabaquite–Talparo
Chatham	Siparia region
Churkoo Village	Princes Town region
Claxton Bay	Couva–Tabaquite–Talparo
Cocorite	Diego Martin region
Cocoyea Village	City of San Fernando
Congo Village	Penal–Debe
Coryal	Sangre Grande region
Couva	Couva–Tabaquite–Talparo
Culloden	Tobago
Cumaca	Sangre Grande region
Cumuto	Sangre Grande region
Cunupia	Borough of Chaguanas
Curepe	Tunapuna–Piarco
Cushe	Mayaro-Rio Claro

== D ==
Name	Location (Region/municipality)
D'Abadie	Tunapuna–Piarco
Datsunville	Borough of Chaguanas
Debe	Penal–Debe
Delaford	Tobago
Delaford-Louis d'Or-Lands Settlement	Tobago
Diamond Vale	Diego Martin Borough Corporation
Diamond Village	Penal–Debe
Dibe	Diego Martin Borough Corporation
Diego Martin	Diego Martin Borough Corporation
Dinsley	Tunapuna–Piarco
Dow Village, Couva	Couva–Tabaquite–Talparo
Dow Village, Siparia	Siparia region
Duncan Village	Penal–Debe

== E ==
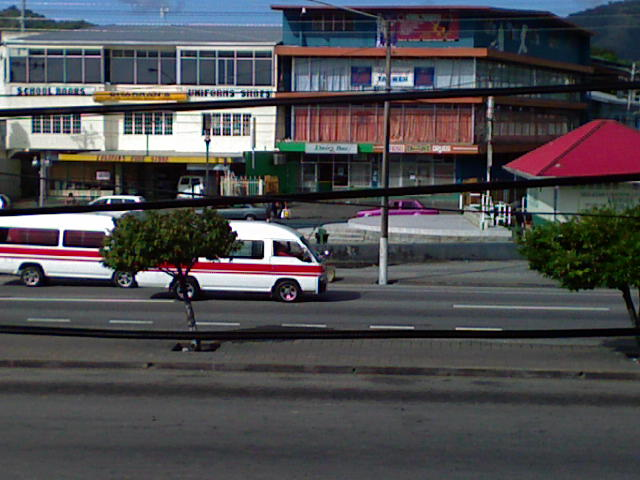
Eastern Main Road, San Juan, in the heart of the East–West Corridor

Name	Location (Region/municipality)
Ecclesville	Rio Claro–Mayaro
Eckel Village	Couva–Tabaquite–Talparo
Edinburgh	Borough of Chaguanas
El Dorado	Tunapuna–Piarco
El Socorro	Tunapuna–Piarco
Enterprise	Borough of Chaguanas
Endeavour	Borough of Chaguanas
Erin	Siparia region
Exchange	Couva–Tabaquite–Talparo

== F ==
Name	Location (Region/municipality)
Febeau Village	San Juan–Laventille
Felicity	Borough of Chaguanas
Fifth Company	Princes Town region
Fishing Pond	Sangre Grande region
Flanigin Town	Couva–Tabaquite–Talparo
Freeport	Couva–Tabaquite–Talparo
Forres Park	Couva–Tabaquite–Talparo
Four Roads	Diego Martin region
Frederick Settlement	Tunapuna–Piarco
Friendship Village	Princes Town region
Fullarton	Siparia region
Fyzabad	Siparia region

== G ==
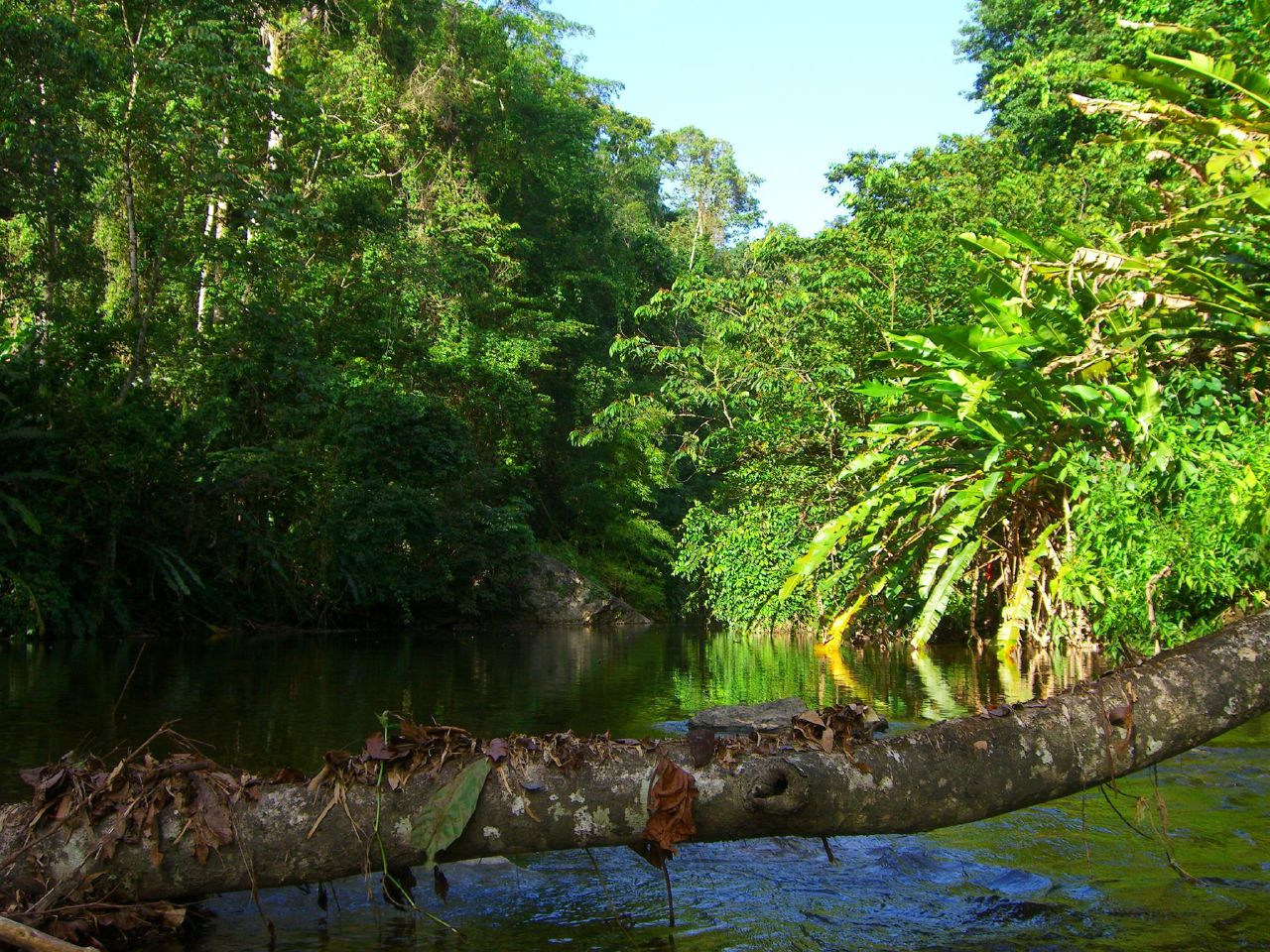
Grande Rivere

Name	Location (Region/municipality)
Gasparillo	Couva–Tabaquite–Talparo
Glamorgan	Tobago
Glencoe	Diego Martin region
Golconda	Princes Town region
Gonzales	City of Port of Spain
Gopaul Lands	San Fernando
Goodwood	Tobago
Goodwood Park	Diego Martin region
Gran Couva	Couva–Tabaquite–Talparo
Grande Riviere	Sangre Grande region
Guaico	Sangre Grande region
Guanapo	Sangre Grande region
Guapo	Borough of Point Fortin
Guayaguayare	Rio Claro–Mayaro
Gulf View	City of San Fernando

== H ==
Name	Location (Region/municipality)
Hardbargain	Princes Town region
Hindustan	Princes Town region
Hope	Tobago

== I ==
Name	Location (Region/municipality))
Icacos	Siparia region
Iere Village	Princes Town region
Indian Chain	Couva-Tabaquite-Talparo
Indian Walk	Princes Town region

== J ==
Name	Location (Region/municipality)
Jerningham Junction	Borough of Chaguanas
John Dial	Tobago
John John	City of Port of Spain
Jordan Hill	Princes Town region

== K ==
Name	Location (Region/municipality)
Kelly Village	Tunapuna–Piarco
Kernaham (or Kernahan)	Rio Claro–Mayaro
Kumar Village	Princes Town region

== L ==
Name	Location (Region/municipality)
L'Anse Fourmi	Tobago
L'Anse Mitan	Diego Martin region
La Brea	Siparia region
La Canoa	San Juan–Laventille
La Horquetta	Tunapuna–Piarco
La Paille Village	Tunapuna-Piarco
La Romaine	City of San Fernando
Las Lomas, Trinidad and Tobago	Tunapuna–Piarco
Lambeau, Tobago	Tobago
Las Cuevas	San Juan–Laventille
Laventille	San Juan–Laventille
Lengua, Trinidad and Tobago	Princes Town region
Les Coteaux	Tobago
Libertville	Mayaro–Rio Claro
Longdenville	Borough of Chaguanas
Lopinot	Tunapuna–Piarco
Los Bajos	Siparia
Louis D'Or	Tobago
Lowlands	Tobago

== M ==
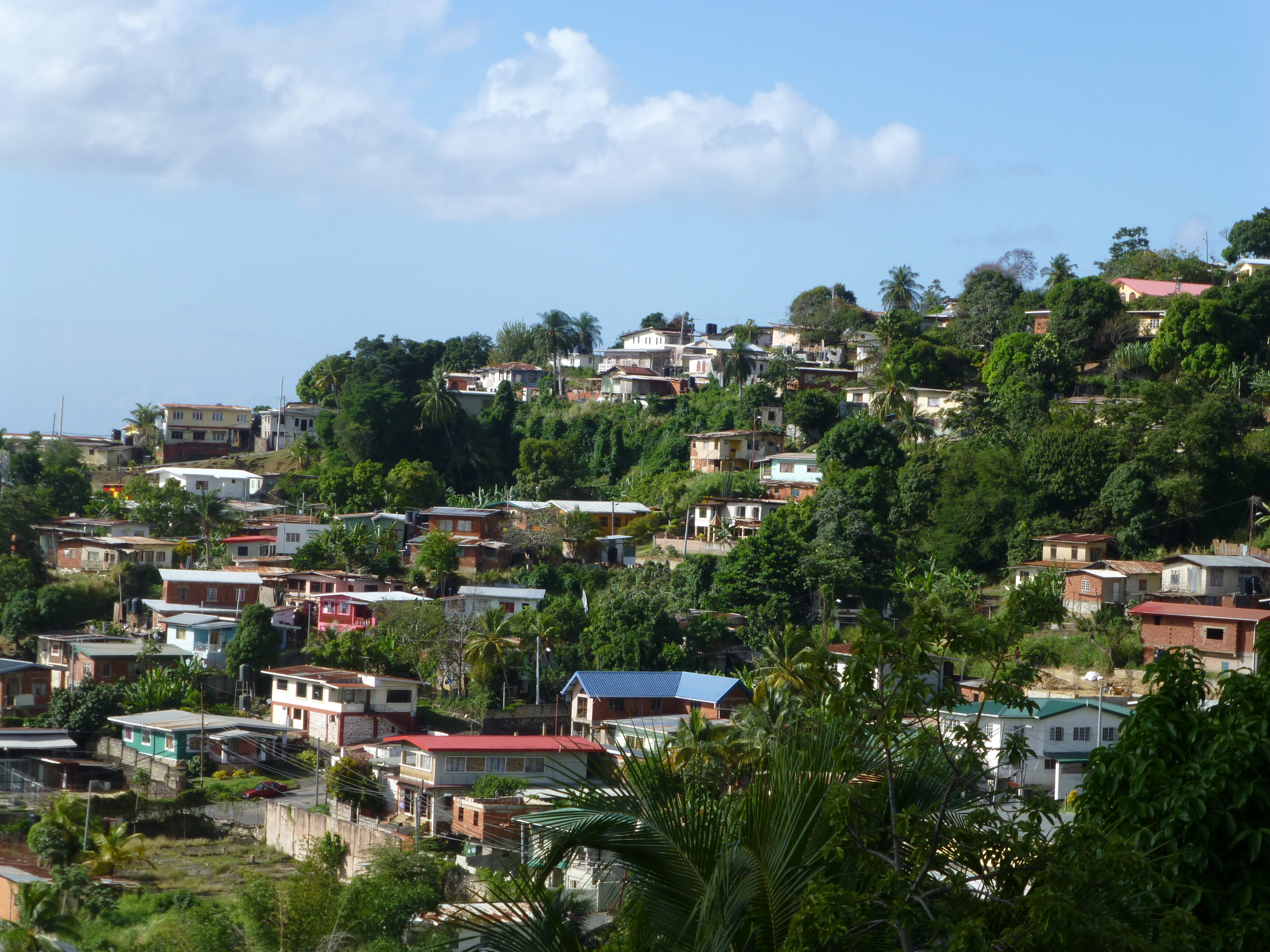
Morvant

Name	Location (Region/municipality)
Macoya	Tunapuna–Piarco
Madras Settlement	Couva-Tabaquite-Talparo
Mairao Village	Rio Claro–Mayaro
Malabar	Borough of Arima
Malick	San Juan–Laventille
Maloney Gardens	Tunapuna–Piarco
Manzanilla	Sangre Grande region
Marabella	City of San Fernando
Maracas	San Juan–Laventille
Maraval	Diego Martin region
Mason Hall	Tobago
Matelot	Sangre Grande region
Matura	Sangre Grande region
Mausica	Tunapuna-Piarco
Mayaro	Rio Claro–Mayaro
Mayo	Couva–Tabaquite–Talparo
Mc Bean	Couva–Tabaquite–Talparo
Mohammedville	San Juan–Laventille
Mon Repos	City of San Fernando
Montrose	Borough of Chaguanas
Monkey Town	Penal-Debe
Montserrat	Couva–Tabaquite–Talparo
Morang	Tunapuna-Piarco
Moriah	Tobago
Morne Diablo	Penal–Debe
Morne Quinton	Tobago
Moruga	Princes Town region
Morvant	San Juan–Laventille
Mount D'Or	San Juan-Laventille
Mount Lambert	San Juan-Laventille
Mount Saint George	Tobago
Mount Stewart	Princes Town region
Mucurapo	City of Port of Spain

== N ==
Name	Location (Region/municipality)
Navet	Couva–Tabaquite–Talparo
New Grant	Princes Town region

== O ==
Name	Location (Region/municipality)
O'Meara	Borough of Arima
Orange Hill	Tobago
Orange Valley	Couva–Tabaquite–Talparo
Oropune Village	Tunapuna–Piarco
Oropouche	Siparia region
Ortoire	Mayaro–Rio Claro
Otaheite	Siparia region

== P ==
Name	Location (Region/municipality)
Palmyra	Princes Town region
Palo Seco	Siparia region
Patna Village	Diego Martin region
Pembroke	Tobago
Penal	Penal–Debe
Penal Rock	Princes Town region
Petit Trou	Sangre Grande region
Petit Valley	Diego Martin region
Phoenix Park	Couva–Tabaquite–Talparo
Piarco	Tunapuna–Piarco
Pierreville	Rio Claro–Mayaro
Piparo	Couva–Tabaquite–Talparo
Plaisance	Rio Claro–Mayaro
Plaisance Park	Couva–Tabaquite–Talparo
Plymouth	Tobago
Point Fortin	Borough of Point Fortin
Point Lisas	Couva–Tabaquite–Talparo
Pointe-à-Pierre	Couva–Tabaquite–Talparo
Poole	Mayaro-Rio Claro
Port of Spain	City of Port of Spain
Preysal	Couva–Tabaquite–Talparo
Princes Town	Princes Town region

== Q ==
Name	Location (Region/municipality)
Quarry Village	Siparia region
Quinam	Siparia region

== R ==
Name	Location (Region/municipality)
Red Hill	Tunapuna–Piarco
Rockly Vale	Tobago
Rampanalgas	Sangre Grande region
Rancho Quemado	Siparia region
Ravin Anglais	Sangre Grande region
Redhead	Sangre Grande region
Rio Claro	Rio Claro–Mayaro
Roussillac	Siparia region
Roxborough	Tobago

== S ==
Name	Location (Region/municipality)
St. Ann's	San Juan-Laventille
St. Augustine	Tunapuna–Piarco
St. Barb's	San Juan-Laventille
St. Clair	Port of Spain
St. Helena	Tunapuna-Piarco
St. James	Port of Spain
St. Joseph	Tunapuna–Piarco
St. Mary's	Couva–Tabaquite–Talparo
Saint Madeleine	Princes Town region
San Fernando	City of San Fernando
San Francique	Penal-Debe
San Juan	San Juan–Laventille
San Raphael	Couva-Tabaquite-Talparo
Sans Souci	Sangre Grande
Sangre Chiquito	Sangre Grande region
Sangre Grande	Sangre Grande region
Santa Cruz	San Juan–Laventille
Santa Flora	Siparia region
Santa Margarita	Tunapuna–Piarco
Santa Rosa	Arima
Savonetta	Couva–Tabaquite–Talparo
Scarborough	Tobago
Signal Hill	Tobago
Siparia	Siparia region
South Oropouche	Siparia region
Speyside	Tobago
Studley Park	Tobago
Spring Village	Tunapuna-Piarco
Syne Village	Siparia region

== T ==
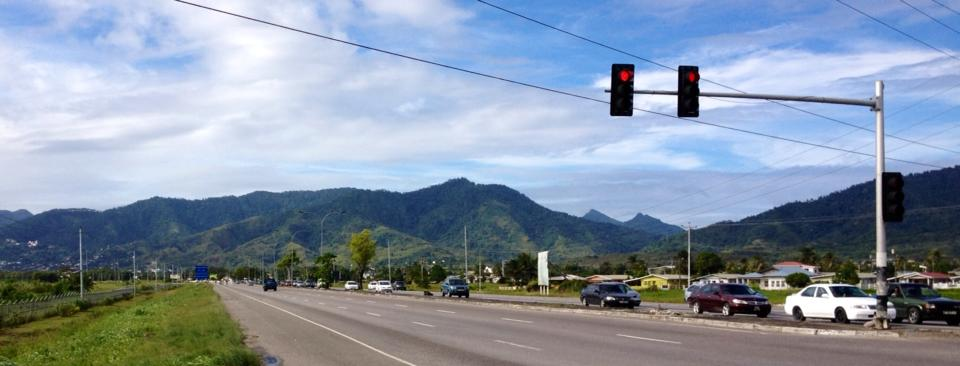
Trincity

Name	Location (Region/municipality)
Tabaquite	Couva–Tabaquite–Talparo
Tableland	Princes Town region
Tacarigua	Tunapuna–Piarco
Talparo	Couva–Tabaquite–Talparo
Techier Village	Point Fortin
Thick Village	Siparia region
Third Company	Princes Town region
Toco	Sangre Grande region
Top Hill	Tobago
Tortuga	Couva–Tabaquite–Talparo
Trincity	Tunapuna–Piarco
Trou Macaque	San Juan-Laventille
Tunapuna	Tunapuna–Piarco

== U ==
Name	Location (Region/municipality)
Union Village	Couva–Tabaquite–Talparo

== V ==
Name	Location (Region/municipality)
Valencia	Sangre Grande region
Valsayn	Tunapuna–Piarco
Vega de Oropouche	Sangre Grande region
Vessigny	Siparia region
Vistabella	City of San Fernando

== W ==
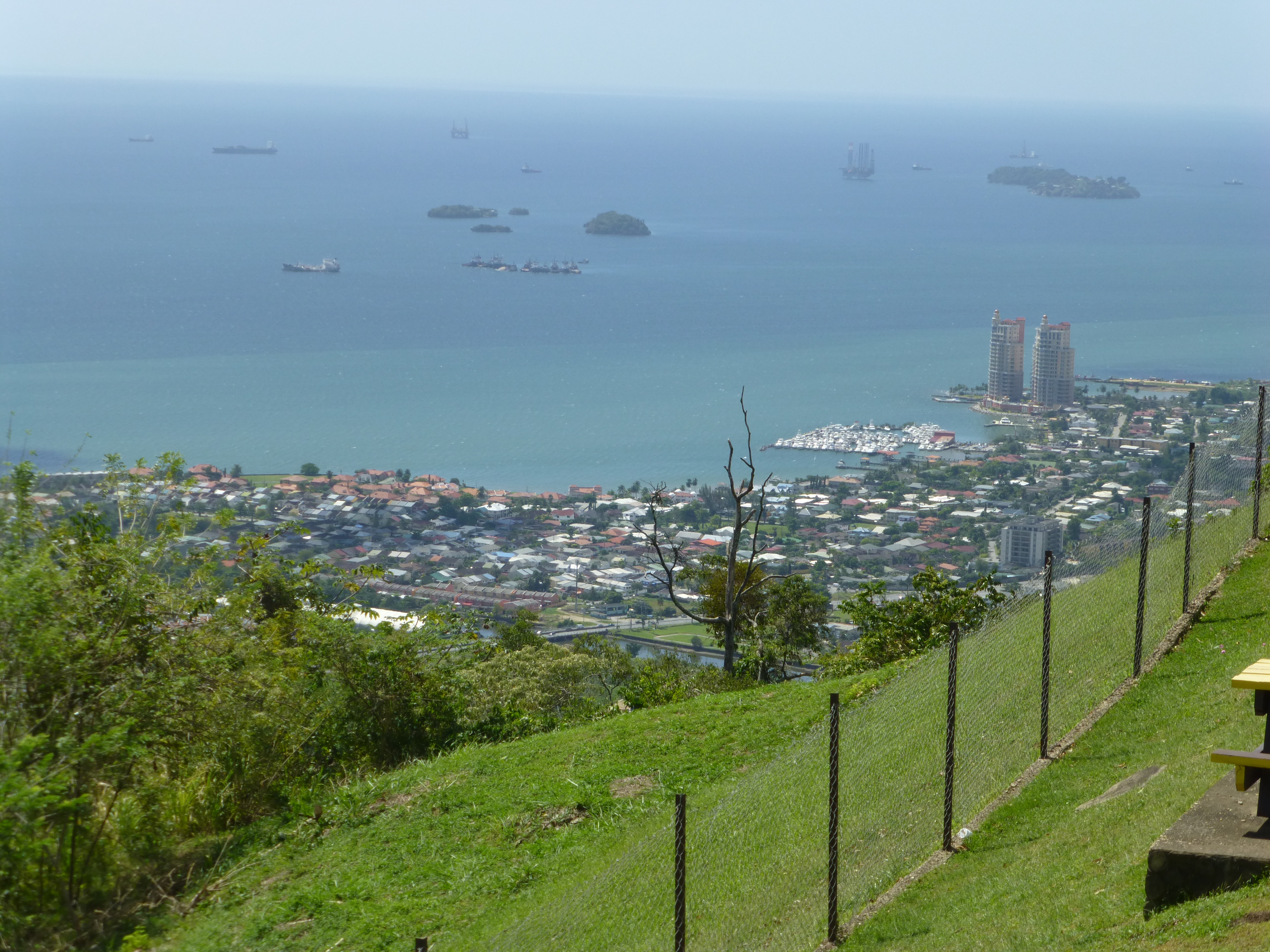
Westmoorings (left)

Name	Location (Region/municipality)
Waterloo	Couva–Tabaquite–Talparo
Westmoorings	Diego Martin region
Whiteland	Couva–Tabaquite–Talparo
Williamsville	Princes Town region
Woodbrook	Port of Spain
