= 1996 Trinidadian local elections =

The 1996 Trinidadian local elections were held on Monday, June 24, 1996 for the regions and municipalities of Trinidad and Tobago. These municipalities and regions were created after the amendment of Act No.8 of 1992.

== Regional Corporations ==

134 Local Areas were contested in 14 Corporations.

- Diego Martin Regional Corporation
- Port of Spain City Corporation
- San Juan–Laventille Regional Corporation
- Tunapuna–Piarco Regional Corporation
- Arima Borough Corporation
- Sangre Grande Regional Corporation
- Chaguanas Borough Corporation
- Couva–Tabaquite–Talparo Regional Corporation
- San Fernando City Corporation
- Princes Town Regional Corporation
- Penal–Debe Regional Corporation
- Siparia Regional Corporation
- Point Fortin Borough Corporation
- Rio Claro–Mayaro Regional Corporation

The results are as follows:

== San Fernando City Corporation ==
Councillor Name	Area Represented
Hazel Rogers Dick	Les Efforts East/Cipero
Clive Braithwaite	Mon Repos/Navet
Leslie Lynch	Cocoyea/Tarouba
Torrance Mohammed	Pleasantville
Josanne Leonard	Marabella South/Vistabella
Alvin Reeves	Marabella West
Sabrina Paul-Mowlah Baksh	Les Efforts West/La Romain
Ellis Chan	Marabella East
Wayne Poliah	Springvale Paradise
