= List of West Indian first-level country subdivisions =

This is a list of first-level country subdivisions within the Caribbean in order of total area. Those administrative divisions that are the largest within their respective countries are highlighted in bold. The list also contains first-level administrative divisions from countries such as Guyana, Suriname, and Belize, which are technically not a part of the Caribbean, but because of their Caribbean cultural heritage are widely accepted. (All references are taken from various Wikipedia articles.) For related lists, see below.

Pos	Subdivisions	Area (km²)	Country
**1**	**Sipaliwini**	**130,567**	**Suriname**
**2**	**Upper Takutu-Upper Essequibo**	**57,750**	**Guyana**
3	Cuyuni-Mazaruni	47,213	Guyana
4	East Berbice-Corentyne	36,234	Guyana
5	Barima-Waini	20,339	Guyana
6	Potaro-Siparuni	20,051	Guyana
7	Upper Demerara-Berbice	19,387	Guyana
**8**	**Camagüey**	**14,134**	**Cuba**
9	Matanzas	11,669	Cuba
10	Pinar del Río	10,860	Cuba
11	Holguín	9,292	Cuba
12	Granma	8,452	Cuba
13	Villa Clara	8,069	Cuba
14	Brokopondo	7,364	Suriname
15	Sancti Spíritus	6,737	Cuba
16	Las Tunas	6,373	Cuba
17	Guantánamo	6,366	Cuba
18	Santiago de Cuba	6,343	Cuba
19	Pomeroon-Supenaam	6,195	Guyana
20	Ciego de Ávila	5,962	Cuba
21	Para	5,393	Suriname
22	Nickerie	5,353	Suriname
**23**	**Cayo**	**5,338**	**Belize**
**24**	**Artibonite**	**4,984**	**Haiti**
25	Ouest	4,827	Haiti
26	Orange Walk	4,737	Belize
27	Toledo	4,648	Belize
28	Marowijne	4,627	Suriname
29	Belize	4,204	Belize
30	Coronie District	3,902	Suriname
31	Mahaica-Berbice	3,755	Guyana
32	Saramacca	3,636	Suriname
**33**	**San Juan**	**3,569.39**	**Dominican Republic**
34	Centre	3,487	Haiti
35	La Altagracia	3,010.34	Dominican Republic
36	Santiago	2,836.51	Dominican Republic
37	Sud	2,794	Haiti
38	Monte Plata	2,632.14	Dominican Republic
39	Azua	2,531.77	Dominican Republic
40	Commewijne	2,353	Suriname
**41**	**North Andros**	**2,293**	**Bahamas**
42	La Vega	2.287.24	Dominican Republic
43	Essequibo Islands-West Demerara	2,232	Guyana
44	Isla de la Juventud	2,199	Cuba
45	Stann Creek	2,176	Belize
46	Nord-Ouest	2,176	Haiti
47	Nord	2,106	Haiti
48	Pedernales	2,074.53	Dominican Republic
49	Sud-Est	2,023	Haiti
50	Independencia	2,006.44	Dominican Republic
51	Monte Cristi	1,924.35	Dominican Republic
52	Grand'Anse	1,912	Haiti
53	Corozal	1,860	Belize
54	Puerto Plata	1,852.9	Dominican Republic
55	Demerara-Mahaica	1,843	Guyana
56	El Seibo	1,786.8	Dominican Republic
57	Barahona	1,739.38	Dominican Republic
58	Inagua	1,679	Bahamas
59	Nord-Est	1,623	Haiti
60	Duarte	1,605.35	Dominican Republic
61	The Inaguas	1,544	Bahamas
62	South Andros	1,448	Bahamas
63	Elías Piña	1,426.2	Dominican Republic
64	Hato Mayor	1,329.29	Dominican Republic
65	Santo Domingo	1,301.84	Dominican Republic
66	Baoruco	1,282.23	Dominican Republic
67	María Trinidad Sánchez	1,271.71	Dominican Republic
68	Nippes	1,267.77	Haiti
69	San Cristóbal	1,265.77	Dominican Republic
70	San Pedro de Macorís	1,255.46	Dominican Republic
**71**	**Saint Ann**	**1,212.6**	**Jamaica**
72	Saint Elizabeth	1,212.4	Jamaica
73	Clarendon	1,196.3	Jamaica
74	Sánchez Ramírez	1,196.13	Dominican Republic
75	Saint Catherine	1,192.4	Jamaica
76	Santiago Rodriguez	1,111.14	Dominican Republic
77	Dajabón	1,020.73	Dominican Republic
78	Monseñor Nouel	992.39	Dominican Republic
**79**	**Sangre Grande**	**927**	**Trinidad and Tobago**
80	Trelawny	874.6	Jamaica
81	San José de Ocoa	855.4	Dominican Republic
82	Samaná	853.74	Dominican Republic
83	Espaillat	838.62	Dominican Republic
84	Manchester	830.1	Jamaica
85	Valverde	823.38	Dominican Republic
86	Mayaro–Rio Claro	814	Trinidad and Tobago
87	Portland	814	Jamaica
88	Westmoreland	807	Jamaica
89	Peravia	792.33	Dominican Republic
90	Saint Thomas	742.8	Jamaica
91	Couva–Tabaquite–Talparo	723	Trinidad and Tobago
92	La Habana	721.28	Cuba
93	La Romana	653.95	Dominican Republic
94	Princes Town	620	Trinidad and Tobago
95	Saint Mary	610.5	Jamaica
96	Long Island	596	Bahamas
97	Saint James	594.9	Jamaica
98	Freeport	558	Bahamas
99	Tunapuna–Piarco	510	Trinidad and Tobago
100	Siparia	495	Trinidad and Tobago
101	Hanover	450.4	Jamaica
102	Wanica	443	Suriname
103	Hermanas Mirabal	440.43	Dominican Republic
104	Saint Andrew	430.7	Jamaica
105	Acklins	389	Bahamas
106	Cat Island	389	Bahamas
107	Tobago	300	Trinidad and Tobago
108	Mayaguana	280	Bahamas
109	Exuma	250	Bahamas
110	Penal–Debe	246	Trinidad and Tobago
111	San Juan–Laventille	239	Trinidad and Tobago
112	New Providence	207	Bahamas
**113**	**Saint Andrew**	**179.9**	**Dominica**
114	Paramaribo	182	Suriname
115	San Salvador Island	163	Bahamas
**116**	**Barbuda**	**160.58**	**Antigua and Barbuda**
**117**	**Charlotte**	**149**	**Saint Vincent and the Grenadines**
118	Crooked Island	148	Bahamas
119	Diego Martin	126	Trinidad and Tobago
120	Saint David	125.8	Dominica
121	Saint Joseph	118.4	Dominica
122	Distrito Nacional	104.44	Dominican Republic
**123**	**Gros Islet**	**101**	**Saint Lucia**
**124**	**Saint Andrew**	**99**	**Grenada**
125	Castries	90.33	Saint Lucia
126	Saint Patrick	86.7	Dominica
127	Saint David	80	Saint Vincent and the Grenadines
128	Berry Islands	78	Bahamas
129	Micoud	78	Saint Lucia
130	Rum Cay	78	Bahamas
131	Dennery	70	Saint Lucia
132	Saint John	66.96	Antigua and Barbuda
133	Saint Paul	66.4	Dominica
134	Saint George	65	Grenada
135	Saint Mary	63.55	Antigua and Barbuda
**136**	**Saint Philip**	**60**	**Barbados**
137	Saint John	59.1	Dominica
138	Chaguanas	59	Trinidad and Tobago
139	Christ Church	57	Barbados
140	Saint George	56.2	Dominica
141	Saint George	52	Saint Vincent and the Grenadines
142	Soufrière	50.51	Saint Lucia
143	Saint Paul	45.27	Antigua and Barbuda
144	Saint David	44	Grenada
145	Saint George	44	Barbados
146	Vieux Fort	43.77	Saint Lucia
147	Grenadines	43	Saint Vincent and the Grenadines
148	Saint Patrick	42	Grenada
149	Saint Philip	40.67	Antigua and Barbuda
150	Saint Michael	39	Barbados
151	Laborie	38	Saint Lucia
152	Saint Patrick	37	Saint Vincent and the Grenadines
153	Saint Andrew	36	Barbados
154	Saint Lucy	36	Barbados
155	Saint John	35	Grenada
156	Saint Peter	34.2	Dominica
157	Carriacou	34	Grenada
158	Saint John	34	Barbados
159	Saint Peter	34	Barbados
160	Saint Peter	32.37	Antigua and Barbuda
**161**	**Saint James Windward**	**32**	**Saint Kitts and Nevis**
162	Anse la Raye	31	Saint Lucia
163	Choiseul	31	Saint Lucia
164	Saint James	31	Barbados
165	Saint Andrew	29	Saint Vincent and the Grenadines
166	Saint George Basseterre	29	Saint Kitts and Nevis
167	Saint Joseph	26	Barbados
168	Point Fortin	25	Trinidad and Tobago
169	Saint John Capisterre	25	Saint Kitts and Nevis
170	Saint Mark	25	Grenada
171	Saint Thomas Middle Island	25	Saint Kitts and Nevis
172	Saint George	24.41	Antigua and Barbuda
173	Bimini	23	Bahamas
174	Ragged Island	23	Bahamas
175	Saint John Figtree	22	Saint Kitts and Nevis
176	Kingston	21.8	Jamaica
177	Saint Peter Basseterre	21	Saint Kitts and Nevis
178	San Fernando	19	Trinidad and Tobago
179	Christ Church Nichola Town	18	Saint Kitts and Nevis
180	Saint George Gingerland	18	Saint Kitts and Nevis
181	Saint Thomas Lowland	18	Saint Kitts and Nevis
182	Canaries	16	Saint Lucia
183	Trinity Palmetto Point	16	Saint Kitts and Nevis
184	Saint Mary Cayon	15	Saint Kitts and Nevis
185	Saint Paul Capisterre	14	Saint Kitts and Nevis
186	Saint Mark	13.5	Dominica
187	Saint Anne Sandy Point	13	Saint Kitts and Nevis
188	Black Point	12.1	Bahamas
189	Arima	12	Trinidad and Tobago
190	Port of Spain	12	Trinidad and Tobago
191	Saint Luke	10.8	Dominica
192	Saint Paul Charlestown	4	Saint Kitts and Nevis
193	Petite Martinique	2.4	Grenada
194	Redonda	1.5	Antigua and Barbuda

== See also ==
- List of Caribbean islands by area
- List of Caribbean islands by political affiliation
- List of Caribbean island countries by population
- List of metropolitan areas in the West Indies
