= Barrackpore, Trinidad and Tobago =

Barrackpore
- Town
- Barrackpore, Trinidad and Tobago
- Coordinates: 10°11′28″N 61°23′38″W
- Country: Trinidad and Tobago
- Region: Penal-Debe
- Named after: Barrackpore, India

Population (2011)
  - Total: 7,578
- Ranked
- Time zone: UTC−4 (AST)
- Postal Code: 84xxxx
- Area code: +1 (868)-654

Barrackpore is a town in southern Trinidad and Tobago. It is located southeast of San Fernando, east of Debe, and northeast of Penal, and is under the administrative authority of the Penal–Debe Regional Corporation.

It is home to the 7 Pot Barrackpore Pepper. Sundar Popo was a resident of Monkey Town, which is in the northwestern part of Barrackpore. Other popular cricket personalities include Rajindra Dhanraj, Daren Ganga, Jason Mohammed, and Samuel Badree. In the small village, a well-known Digity Mud Volcano can be found. One of the renown landmarks is the Subrattee trace masjid, it is also home to the seven old sugar cane weighing stations, and is well known as the home of sugar cane and rice and the locomotive, since the early 1950s.
