= L'Anse =

L'Anse may refer to:

In Canada

- L'Anse aux Meadows, Newfoundland
- L'Anse-Saint-Jean, Quebec

In the United States

- L'Anse, Michigan, a village in the Upper Peninsula
- L'Anse Township, Michigan
- L'Anse Indian Reservation

Elsewhere

- L'Anse Mitan, Trinidad and Tobago
