= Belle Garden =

- Locality
- Interactive map of Belle Garden
- Coordinates: 11°14′6″N 60°36′0.72″W
- Country: Trinidad and Tobago
- Island: Tobago

Population (2011)
  - Total: 544

Belle Garden is a town in Trinidad and Tobago, which is part of the parish of St. Paul.

== History ==
The town, which was founded by French planters, was named after a plantation owners wife who saw the emancipation of the slaves that lived there.

== Geography ==
The locality covers part of the island of Tobago and is bordered to the north by Argyle-Kendal, to the south and east by the Atlantic Ocean, and to the west by Zion Hill.

== Demography ==
Demographic data for the town of Belle Garden:

demography vertical bar chart of Belle Gardens between 2000 and 2011

== Politics ==
Belle Garden is part of the Tobago East constituency for elections to the Parliament of Trinidad and Tobago.

== See also ==
- List of cities and towns in Trinidad and Tobago
