= Argyle-Kendal =

- Locality
- Interactive map of Argyle-Kendal
- Coordinates: 11°14′34.08″N 60°35′15″W
- Country: Trinidad and Tobago
- Island: Tobago

Population (2011)
  - Total: 625

Argyle-Kendal is a town in Trinidad and Tobago, which is part of the parish of St. Paul.

== History ==
The area is known for Argyle Falls, a popular waterfall in Tobago.

== Geography ==
The locality covers part of the island of Tobago and is bordered to the north by Campbleton-Charlotteville (a locality belonging to the parish of St. John), to the south by the Atlantic Ocean, to the east by Roxborough, and to the west by Campbleton-Charlotteville, Bloody Bay (both localities belonging to the parish of St. John ) and Glamorgan (a locality belonging to the parish of St. Mary).

== Demography ==
Demographic data for the town of Argyle-Kendal:

demography vertical bar chart of Argyle-Kendal between 2000 and 2011

== Politics ==
Argyle-Kendal is part of the Tobago East constituency for elections to the Parliament of Trinidad and Tobago.

== See also ==
- List of cities and towns in Trinidad and Tobago
