= Brighton, Trinidad and Tobago =

Brighton
- Town
- Interactive map of Brighton
- Coordinates: 10°14′20.4″N 61°38′1.68″W
- Country: Trinidad and Tobago
- Region: Siparia

Population (2011)
  - Total: 18

Brighton is a town in the Siparia region of Trinidad and Tobago.

== Geography ==
The town is located on the coast of the island of Trinidad and is bordered to the north and west by the Gulf of Paria, to the south by Vessigny, and to the east by La Brea and Sobo Village.

== Demography ==
Demographic data for the town of Brighton:

demographic vertical bar chart of Brighton between 2000 and 2011

== See also ==
- List of cities and towns in Trinidad and Tobago
