= Arnos Vale =

Arnos Vale is the name of several places:

- Arnos Vale, Bristol – district of Bristol, England
  - Arnos Vale Cemetery – historic cemetery in Bristol, England
- Arnos Vale, Saint Vincent and the Grenadines – town in Saint Vincent
- Arnos Vale, Trinidad and Tobago – town in Tobago

== See also ==
- Arno (disambiguation)
