= List of shipwrecks in June 1886 =

The list of shipwrecks in June 1886 includes ships sunk, foundered, grounded, or otherwise lost during June 1886.

== 3 June ==
List of shipwrecks: 3 June 1886
Ship	State	Description
Lookout	United States	The schooner was wrecked on Sanak Island in the Aleutian Islands, District of Alaska. Her fifteen crew survived.
Thomas P. Sheldon	United States	The schooner was sunk in a collision with Russia (flag unknown) in the St. Marys River. Her crew were rescued by New Orleans (flag unknown). Apparently raised, repaired and returned to service.

== 4 June ==
List of shipwrecks: 4 June 1886
Ship	State	Description
Caterina Doge	Italy	The barque was wrecked at Olifantsbos, Cape Colony with the loss of five of her twelve crew. She was on a voyage from Cardiff, Glamorgan, United Kingdom to Table Bay.

== 5 June ==
List of shipwrecks: 5 June 1886
Ship	State	Description
Alpha	United States	The paddle tug was destroyed by fire.

== 10 June ==
List of shipwrecks: 10 June 1886
Ship	State	Description
Happy Return	United Kingdom	The ship was run into by a steamship in the River Avon and was severely damaged.

== 11 June ==
List of shipwrecks: 11 June 1886
Ship	State	Description
Margrethe	United Kingdom	The schooner was run into by the steamship Hero (United Kingdom) and sank. Her crew were rescued by Hero. Margrethe was on a voyage from London to Goole, Yorkshire.

== 12 June ==
List of shipwrecks: 12 June 1886
Ship	State	Description
Balmoral	United Kingdom	The fishing trawler, a paddle steamer, ran aground at Dysart, Fife. She was refloated and taken in to Dysart in a leaky condition.
Ironsides	Canada	The ship was abandoned in the Atlantic Ocean. Her crew were rescued by Emilie Hessenmuller (Flag unknown). Ironsides was on a voyage from Fernandina Island, Galapagos Islands to Buenos Aires, Argentina.
Lyttelton	United Kingdom	The full-rigged ship sank at Timaru, New Zealand and was expected to become a total wreck.

== 17 June ==
List of shipwrecks: 17 June 1886
Ship	State	Description
David Vance	United States	The schooner, under tow of the steam barge Bessemer (United States), was damaged when she hit a pile of rocks at Lime-Kiln Crossing, in the Detroit River. She was taken to Amherstburg, Ontario, Canada where she sank. She was later raised, repaired and returned to service.

== 18 June ==
List of shipwrecks: 18 June 1886
Ship	State	Description
Jan Mayen	Flag unknown	The ship was lost on this date.

== 19 June ==
List of shipwrecks: 19 June 1886
Ship	State	Description
Boyne	United Kingdom	The barque was driven ashore and wrecked 25 nautical miles (46 km) north east of Pooree, India.

== 21 June ==
List of shipwrecks: 21 June 1886
Ship	State	Description
John Carver	United States	The whaling barque was crushed in ice and abandoned in the Bering Sea north of Saint Lawrence Island and 25 nautical miles (46 km; 29 mi) south of King Island, District of Alaska. Her crew abandoned ship in her boats and were rescued 33 hours later by the barque Atlantic (United States). The derelict wreck of John Carver eventually drifted to Cape Thompson on the Chukchi Sea coast of the District of Alaska.

== 23 June ==
List of shipwrecks: 23 June 1886
Ship	State	Description
Francesco	United Kingdom	The ship departed from the River Tyne for Cape Town, Cape Colony. No further trace, reported missing.
Mary Atwater	United States	The schooner was sunk in a collision with City of Kingston (flag unknown) in the Hudson River off Fort Montgomery, New York with the loss of two of her crew.

== 26 June ==
List of shipwrecks: 26 June 1886
Ship	State	Description
Moselle	United Kingdom	The steamship was damaged by fire and was severely damaged in the River Thames.
Silverdale	United Kingdom	The steamship was wrecked at "Point Engano". She was on a voyage from Antwerp, Belgium to Coló, United States of Colombia.
Syringa	United Kingdom	The barque was destroyed by fire at sea. She was abandoned 40 nautical miles (74 km) off the Algnada Reef, in the Bay of Bengal. All twelve people on board took to a boat; they were rescued by the tug Mary (Burma). Syringa was on a voyage from Chittagong, India to Union Island, Mauritius.

== 27 June ==
List of shipwrecks: 27 June 1886
Ship	State	Description
Teutonia	United Kingdom	The steamship ran aground in the Suez Canal.

== 30 June ==
List of shipwrecks: 30 June 1886
Ship	State	Description
Birgitte	Norway	The bark drifted ashore in Apalachicola Bay opposite Dog Island during a hurricane.
C. Ervlin	United States	The tug sank at the East Pass to Apalachicola Bay near Cat Point during a hurricane. Two of her crew were killed. Two barges she was towing were driven ashore.
California	United States	The schooner was lost in Dog Island Cove, Apalachicola Bay during a hurricane with the loss of four of her crew.
Lake Champlain	United Kingdom	The ship was driven ashore in Cushenden Bay. She was refloated on 22 August and taken in to the Belfast Lough.

== Unknown date ==
List of shipwrecks: Unknown date in June 1886
Ship	State	Description
Arcot	United Kingdom	The steamship struck a sunken rock off Kotlah Island. She was beached at Colombo, Ceylon.
Astride	Norway	The ship ran aground at Saltholmen, Denmark. She was on a voyage from Sundsvall, Sweden to Papenburg, Germany. She was later refloated and resumed her voyage.
Aviona	United Kingdom	The steamship ran aground in Canadian waters.
Bernard	United Kingdom	The steamship was driven ashore. She was on a voyage from Barrow-in-Furness, Lancashire to New York, United States. She was later refloated and taken in to New York.
Christianshavn	Netherlands	The barque was wrecked at Petit Trou, Trinidad.
Compton	United Kingdom	The steamship was wrecked on a reef off Balabac Island, Netherlands East Indies. Her crew survived. She was on a voyage from Singapore, Straits Settlements to Yloilo, Spanish East Indies.
Ethelbert	Flag unknown	The steamship struck a sunken rock and was severely damaged at Norrköping, Sweden. She was on a voyage from Oskarshamn to Norrköping.
Gertrude	United Kingdom	The steamship was wrecked at Cape Pine, Newfoundland Colony before 7 June. Her crew survived. She was on a voyage from New Orleans, Louisiana, United States to Copenhagen, Denmark.
James T. Abbott	United States	The ship was driven ashore at Easthampton, Massachusetts. She was on a voyage from the Turks Islands to Vineyard Haven, Massachusetts.
John C. Munroe	Western Australia	The ship was driven ashore in a cyclone at Vasse.
Julia Weiner	Flag unknown	The steamship was driven ashore and severely damaged. She was later refloated and towed in to Copenhagen.
Lake Simcoe	Western Australia	The ship was driven ashore in a cyclone at Vasse.
Lord Clive	United Kingdom	The steamship ran aground at "Austruwell". She was on a voyage from Antwerp, Belgium to Civitavecchi, Italy. She was later refloated and resumed her voyage.
Miranda	United States	The ship was abandoned off Point Judith, Rhode Island.
Propontis	United Kingdom	The steamship ran aground in the Saigon River.
Ranger	United Kingdom	The steamship was driven ashore on the coast of Texas, United States. She was later refloated and taken in to New Orleans for repairs.
St. Mark	United Kingdom	The ship ran aground on the Swash, in the Bristol Channel off the coast of Somerset. She was refloated on 25 June and taken in to Avonmouth, Somerset.
Svendre Brodre	Norway	The brig ran aground on the Haisborough Sands, in the North Sea off the coast of Norfolk, United Kingdom. She was on a voyage from Dram to Great Yarmouth, Norfolk. She was refloated and towed in to Great Yarmouth in a leaky condition.
Terpsichore	Denmark	The schooner was driven ashore in Lopness Bay, Orkney Islands, United Kingdom. She was on a voyage from South Shields, County Durham, United Kingdom to Iceland. She was later refloated and taken in to Kirkwall, Orkney Islands.
Thetford	United Kingdom	The steamship was driven ashore at Piteå, Sweden.
Unnamed	French Navy	A torpedo boat sank off the coast of Corsica before 5 June while manouevering against Ironclad warships.
