= Siparia =

- Town
- Location of Siparia, Trinidad and Tobago Siparia (the Caribbean) Siparia (North America)
- Coordinates: 10°08′N 61°30′W
- Country: Trinidad and Tobago
- Borough: Siparia
- Settled: 1758

Government
  - Type: Borough Corporation
  - Mayor: Doodnath Mayrhoo

Area
  - Total: 47.8 km^{2} (18.5 sq mi)
- Elevation: 39 m (128 ft)

Population (2011)
  - Total: 14,535
  - Density: 304/km^{2} (788/sq mi)
- Time zone: UTC−4 (AST)
- Postal Code(s): 72xxxx
- Area code: +1 (868)-649

Siparia is a town in southern Trinidad, in Trinidad and Tobago, south of San Fernando, southwest of Penal and Debe and southeast of Fyzabad.

== History ==
Also called "The Sand City", Siparia was originally a non-Mission Amerindian settlement. Siparia grew to be the administrative centre for Saint Patrick County, and later the capital of the eponymous region that in 2023 was appointed a borough.

== La Divina Pastora (Siparia Mai) ==
Siparia is home to the annual festival of La Divina Pastora (Mary, as mother of the Good Shepherd), named for a Black Virgin enshrined as the church's patron saint. It is held on the feast day of La Divina Pastora some few weeks after Easter. Hindus also hold the separate Siparia Fete on Maundy Thursday and Good Friday. The image is considered a manifestation of the Blessed Virgin Mary by Catholics, while Hindus call her Siparee Mai ("Mother of Siparia"), variously identified as the form of a particular goddess such as Kali, Durga or Lakshmi, or seen as one in her own right. Aside from these religious groups most commonly associated with her cultus, she is revered as a folk saint by Anglicans, Spiritual Baptists, Rastafarians, Orishas, Baháʼís, and the indigenous Warao people. Early Chinese settlers who practised Buddhism and Chinese folk religion understood her to be an emanation of the bodhisattva, Guanyin. There have even been some Muslims who regard the site as holy and say prayers facing Mecca, but do not revere the statue as it is haram.

The precise origins of the statue is unknown, but it is known to have been in the Siparia area since at least the 18th century.

== Notable people from Siparia ==
- Giselle Salandy, boxer
- Ian Morris, track and field athlete
- Kamla Persad-Bissessar, politician, and 6th and 9th Prime Minister of Trinidad and Tobago
- Njisane Phillip, cyclist
