= Wilson Road Recreation Ground =

Cricket ground in Penal, Trinidad and Tobago

Ground information
- Location: Penal, Trinidad and Tobago
- Coordinates: 10.1685°N 61.4224°W
- Establishment: c. 1980

Team information
Trinidad and Tobago	(1999/00–2006/07)
- As of 16 February 2022; Source: Ground profile

Wilson Road Recreation Ground is a cricket ground located along Wilson Road in Penal, Trinidad and Tobago.

== History ==
The ground hosted its inaugural first-class match when Trinidad and Tobago played the touring India A cricket team in November 1999, with three further first-class matches being played at the ground. Two of these saw Trinidad and Tobago play the Leeward Islands in the 1999–00 Busta Cup and India A in the 2002–03 Carib Beer Cup, while a third match saw West Indies B host Barbados in the 2000–01 Busta Cup. Trinidad and Tobago returned to the ground in February 2007, playing a List A one-day match there against the Windward Islands in the KFC Cup, with Trinidad winning by two wickets.

== Records ==
=== First-class ===
- Highest team total: 291 for 7 declared by Barbados v West Indies B, 2000–01
- Lowest team total: 114 all out by Trinidad and Tobago v Leeward Islands, 1999–00
- Highest individual innings: 94 by Imran Jan for Trinidad and Tobago v India A, 2002–03
- Best bowling in an innings: 5-30 by Amit Mishra for India A v Trinidad and Tobago, as above
- Best bowling in a match: 8-109 by Mukesh Persad for Trinidad and Tobago v India A, 1999–00

== See also ==
- List of cricket grounds in the West Indies
