= Dow Village, South Oropouche =

Dow Village
- Village
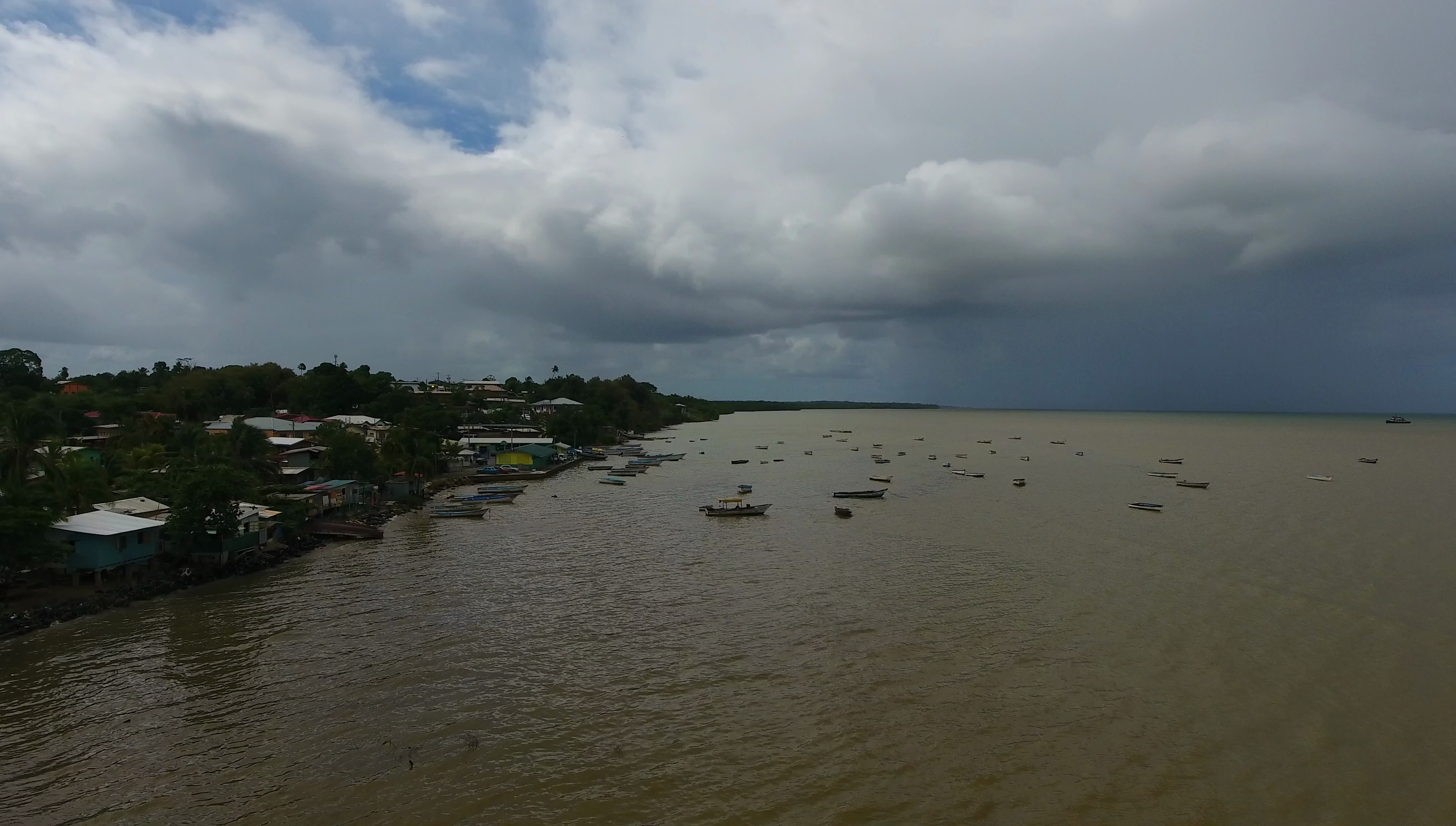
- Interactive map of Dow Village
- Coordinates: 10°13′N 61°33′W
- Country: Trinidad and Tobago
- Region: Siparia
- Town: South Oropouche
- Time zone: UTC−4 (AST)

Dow Village is a village west of South Oropouche in Trinidad and Tobago. It is located in the region of Siparia. It is often confused with another Dow Village located near the neighbourhood of California, just east of Southern Main Road, in Couva.
