= Bonasse =

- village
- Location in Trinidad and Tobago
- Coordinates: 10°5′35″N 61°51′37″W
- Country: Trinidad and Tobago
- Borough: Siparia

Population (2011)
  - Total: 659

Bonasse is a village on the Cedros peninsula in Siparia, Trinidad and Tobago. The origin of its name is French, with "bonasse" meaning "indulgent".
