= Valencia, Trinidad and Tobago =

Valencia
- Town
- Interactive map of Valencia
- Coordinates: 10°39′N 61°12′W
- Country: Trinidad and Tobago
- Region: Sangre Grande
- Settled: 1890

Population (2011)
  - Total: 12,327
  - Rank: 5th
- Time zone: UTC−4 (AST)
  - Summer (DST): UTC−4 (not observed)
- Postal Code(s): 41xxxx
- Area code: +1 (868) 664, 667, 820

Valencia is a town located in northeastern Trinidad island, in the Republic of Trinidad and Tobago.

It is administered by the Sangre Grande Regional Corporation.
