= Matelot, Trinidad and Tobago =

Settlement in Trinidad and Tobago

Coordinates: 10°49′N 61°07′W

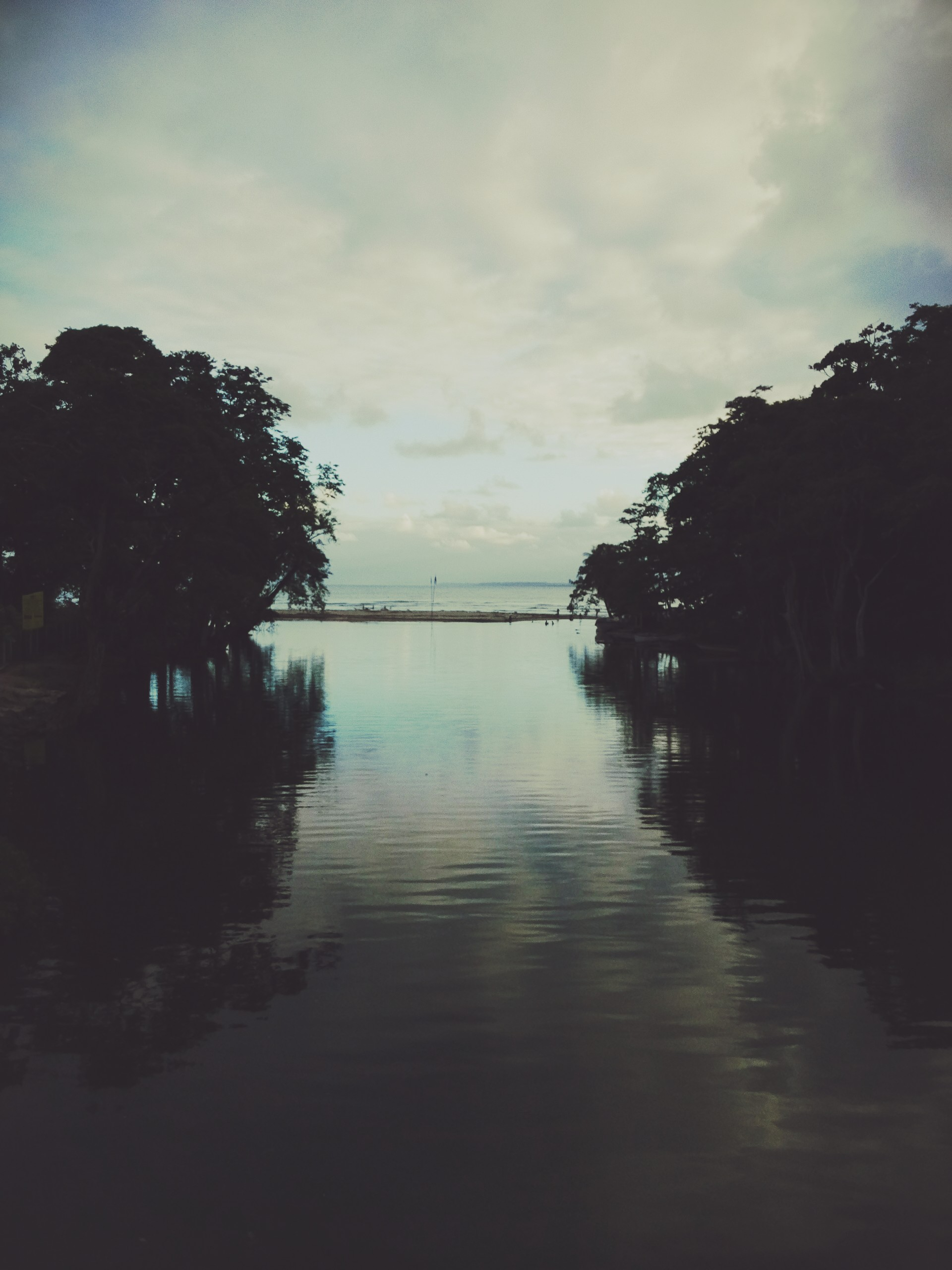
Mouth of the Matelot River

Matelot is a settlement in Trinidad and Tobago. Located on the north coast of Trinidad in the Sangre Grande region, the village has traditionally been seen as one of the most remote places on the island.

== History ==
The Matelot area was inhabited by Amerindian groups until 1760 when the population was resettled at the Spanish mission at Toco. In 1783 two Venezuelan families—Estrada and Salvary—settled in Matelot after being granted land in the Cedula of Population. By 1873 there were forty families in the village and in 1887 the population was reported to be about 280, most descended from the Estrada and Salvary families.

The development of cacao cultivation in the late nineteenth century lead to economic development and population growth. Driven by immigration from other West Indian islands and Venezuela, the population expanded to 605 by 1933. Falling cocoa prices in the 1920s and '30s drove the village into decline.
