= L'Anse Mitan =

Urban Community in Trinidad and Tobago

- Urban Community
- Location within Trinidad and Tobago
- Coordinates: 10°41′11″N 61°34′50″W
- Country: Trinidad and Tobago
- Region: Diego Martin

Area
  - Total: 2.14 km^{2} (0.83 sq mi)
- Elevation: 42 m (138 ft)

Population (2011)
  - Total: 1,812
  - Density: 847/km^{2} (2,190/sq mi)

L'Anse Mitan is an urban community in Diego Martin, Trinidad and Tobago. It is located on the northwestern coast of the island of Trinidad, bordering the towns of La Horquette, Big Yard and Carenage. It had a population of 1,812 as of 2011.
