= Argyle Waterfall =

Waterfall in Tobago

Argyle Waterfall is a waterfall near in Tobago, near the town of Roxborough. The waterfall is 175 feet (53 m) high, An entrance fee is charged for access to the waterfall by footpath.

In 2019, two teenagers drowned after encountering a sudden rush of water from the falls.
