= Santa Flora =

Community on island of Trinidad

Santa Flora is a community in the Republic of Trinidad and Tobago. It is located in southern Trinidad, and is administered by the Siparia Regional Corporation.

== History ==
After the discovery of light crude in the Palo Seco oilfield, the Trinidad Petroleum Development Company (TPD) established a refinery in Santa Flora in the 1930s. BP later acquired TPD and built its head offices in Santa Flora as it consolidated its assets in the Siparia region. During the Black Power Revolution in 1969, BP's assets were purchased by the government. State-owned Petrotrin operated a small petroleum refinery in Santa Flora from 1993 until the company's closure on 30 November 2018.
