= Aranguez =

- Suburb
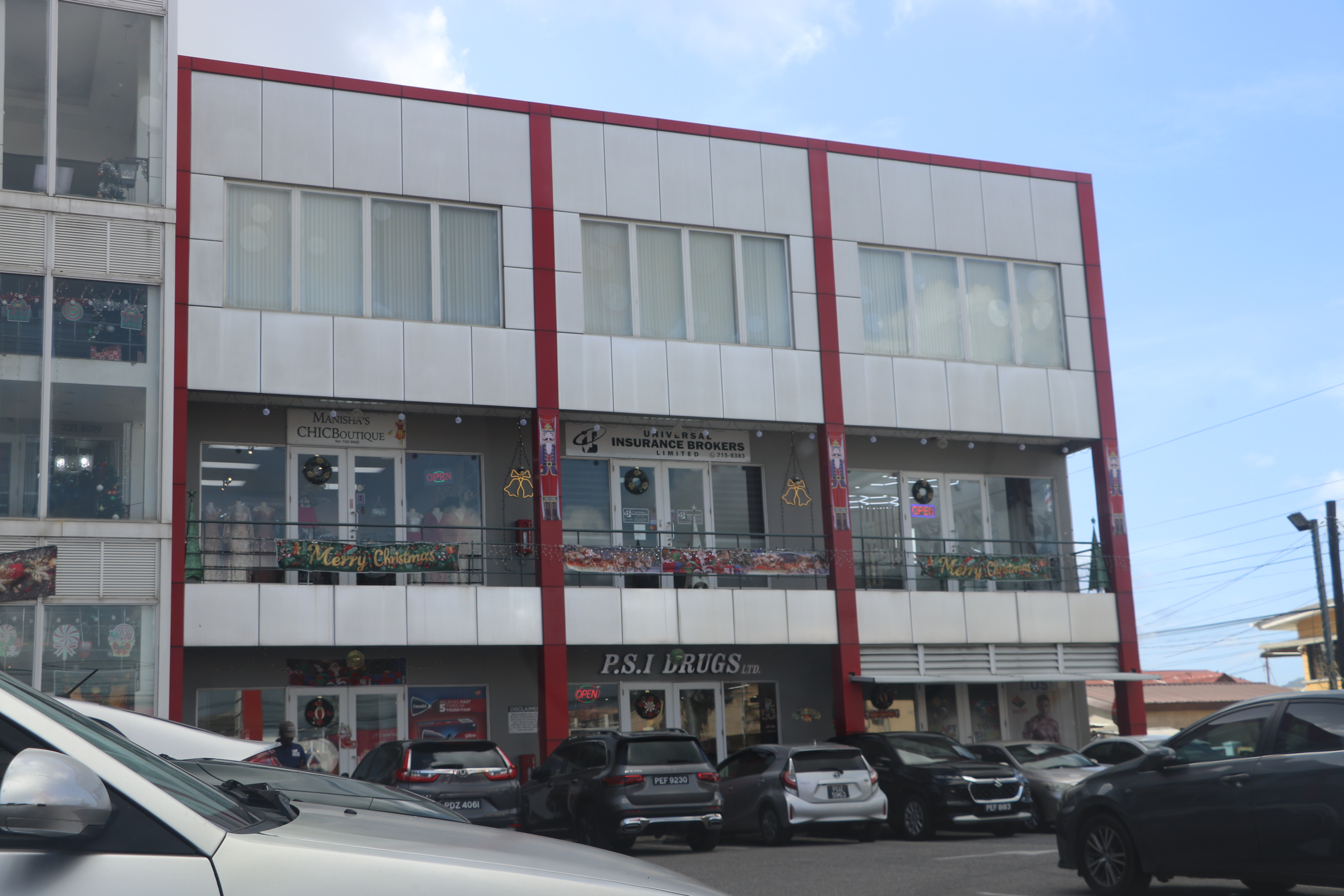
- Aranguez Plaza
- Interactive map of Aranguez
- Coordinates: 10°38′27.24″N 61°26′34.8″W
- Country: Trinidad and Tobago
- City: San Juan

Aranguez is a suburb of San Juan, Trinidad and Tobago.

== History ==
Aranguez was first developed as a farming community. The Aranguez Savannah was once a vast rice plain, later a livestock grazing ground. Historically, Aranguez was the breadbasket of Port of Spain. In the 20th century, urbanisation and commercialisation as well as new housing developments lead to the establishment of new industries.

== Politics ==
Aranguez is part of the Aranguez/St. Joseph constituency for elections to the Parliament of Trinidad and Tobago.

== See also ==
- List of cities and towns in Trinidad and Tobago
