= Gonzales, Trinidad and Tobago =

Neighborhood in east Port of Spain

Coordinates: 10°39′36″N 61°29′56″W

Gonzales is a neighborhood in east Port of Spain, the capital of Trinidad and Tobago. It is administered by the Port of Spain City Corporation. Known for its historical significance, cultural contributions, and urban challenges, the community is situated in a hilly terrain and has a population of approximately 2,811 residents.

== History ==
Gonzales traces its roots back to the post-emancipation era of the 1830s. After the abolition of slavery in 1834, many formerly enslaved Africans rejected the British apprenticeship system and left sugar plantations in search of freedom and autonomy. Many settled on the outskirts of Port of Spain, in areas like Gonzales, where they formed independent communities and engaged in informal trades and artisanal work.

In 1920, the Port of Spain Corporation was granted the option to purchase land known as "Gonzales Place" from Mrs. Octavia Gonzales, a woman of British descent. The land was eventually sold to the City Council for TT$15,000, and by 1937, workers’ homes were constructed, followed by road development. Initially, Hermitage Road was the only formal street and was lined with homes occupied by the elite, primarily Caucasian residents. However, as the Black population grew and elites moved out, the social makeup of the area shifted.

By the 1940s, increasing overcrowding and deteriorating living conditions led to further government intervention in the form of a housing project near St. Martin’s RC Church. However, the effort was limited and failed to address the area's broader development needs, resulting in long-term social tensions between long-standing and relocated residents—tensions that continue to shape community dynamics today.

Between 2000 and 2005, Gonzales faced a rise in gang-related violence, which led to the introduction of a community development program known as "Pride in Gonzales." The initiative focused on improving public safety, expanding youth programs, enhancing waste management, and upgrading local infrastructure.

== Urban Characteristics ==
Residents consider Gonzales as having two main areas:

- Lower Gonzales: A more formally developed section of the community, Lower Gonzales consists of planned infrastructure, paved roads, and houses largely built with concrete or a combination of concrete and wood. Two streets (approximately 100 houses) were part of a government housing project in the 1930s, while the rest of the area was developed privately. By the mid-20th century, it attracted many lower middle-class families, though economic decline in the 1970s and 1980s led to increasing poverty. Today, Lower Gonzales is characterized by high unemployment, with most residents working in low-income or seasonal jobs. Half of households live in good-quality homes, though the other half reside in houses made only of concrete (50%), a concrete-wood combination (44%), or wood (6%).
- Upper Gonzales: Situated on the steep hillsides of Gonzales, this area developed in the 1970s as an informal settlement. Unlike the more accessible Lower Gonzales, Upper Gonzales is largely unplanned, with winding paths and difficult terrain. Although most households have electricity, water access is limited—residents rely on standpipes, rainwater collection, or buying water from other communities. Despite the informal nature of the settlement, most residents own their homes and do not report high levels of tenure insecurity, partly due to long-term occupation and the lack of state intervention in evicting or demolishing homes. Houses here are predominantly constructed with permanent materials like concrete or concrete-wood combinations, and many residents have undergone legal procedures to regularize land tenure.

The community faces ongoing challenges related to crime, deteriorating infrastructure, and limited municipal services. Like many urban communities with areas developed outside formal planning systems, Gonzales struggles with issues such as poor housing stock, inadequate road networks, and lack of open public space. Some local entrepreneurs in Gonzales have reported that they must actively reassure suppliers about safety in order to secure deliveries, as certain distributors are hesitant to enter the area due to concerns over road conditions and personal security.

== Places of Interest ==
- Gloster Lodge Moravian School
- Saint Martin De Porres Roman Catholic Church
- Robert Greenidge Sporting Facilities
- Kailash Mandir Temple in the Sky
