= Santa Margarita, Trinidad and Tobago =

Residential community

Santa Margarita in St. Augustine, Trinidad and Tobago, is a residential community that consists of single family homes and gated communities consisting of townhouses and condominiums. It is near the Hugh Wooding Law School, the University of the West Indies, and the Seismic Research Center as well as the university's School of Optometry, the Department of Creative and Festival Arts, and the St. Augustine Secondary School.
