= Guaico =

Community in Trinidad and Tobago

- Village
- Interactive map of Guaico
- Country: Trinidad and Tobago
- Region: Sangre Grande

Population (2011)
  - Total: 3,058

Guaico is a community on the northeast of Trinidad island, in the Republic of Trinidad and Tobago.

It is located west of Sangre Grande, and is administered by the Sangre Grande Regional Corporation.

== Gallery ==
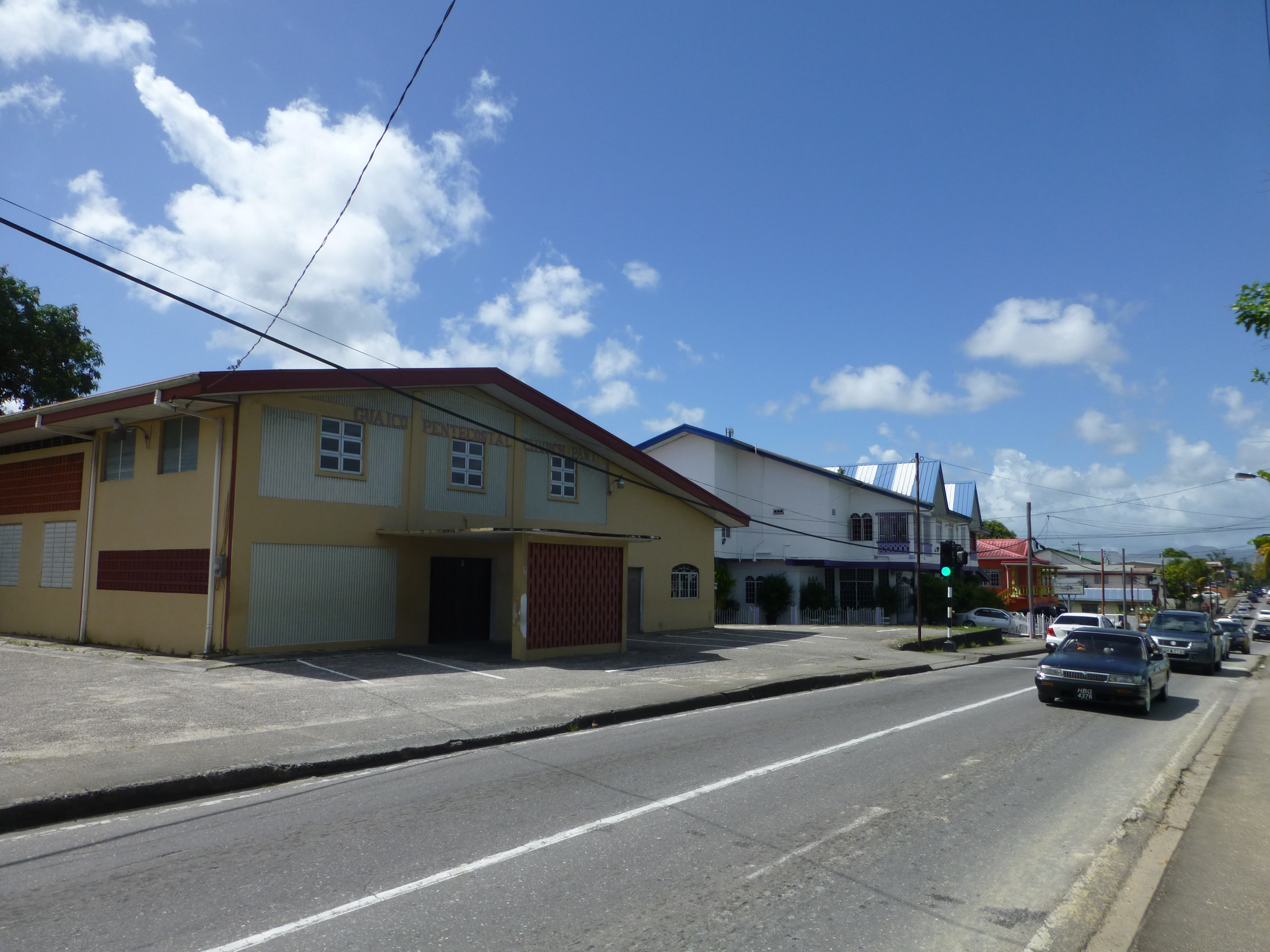
Guaico Pentecostal Church

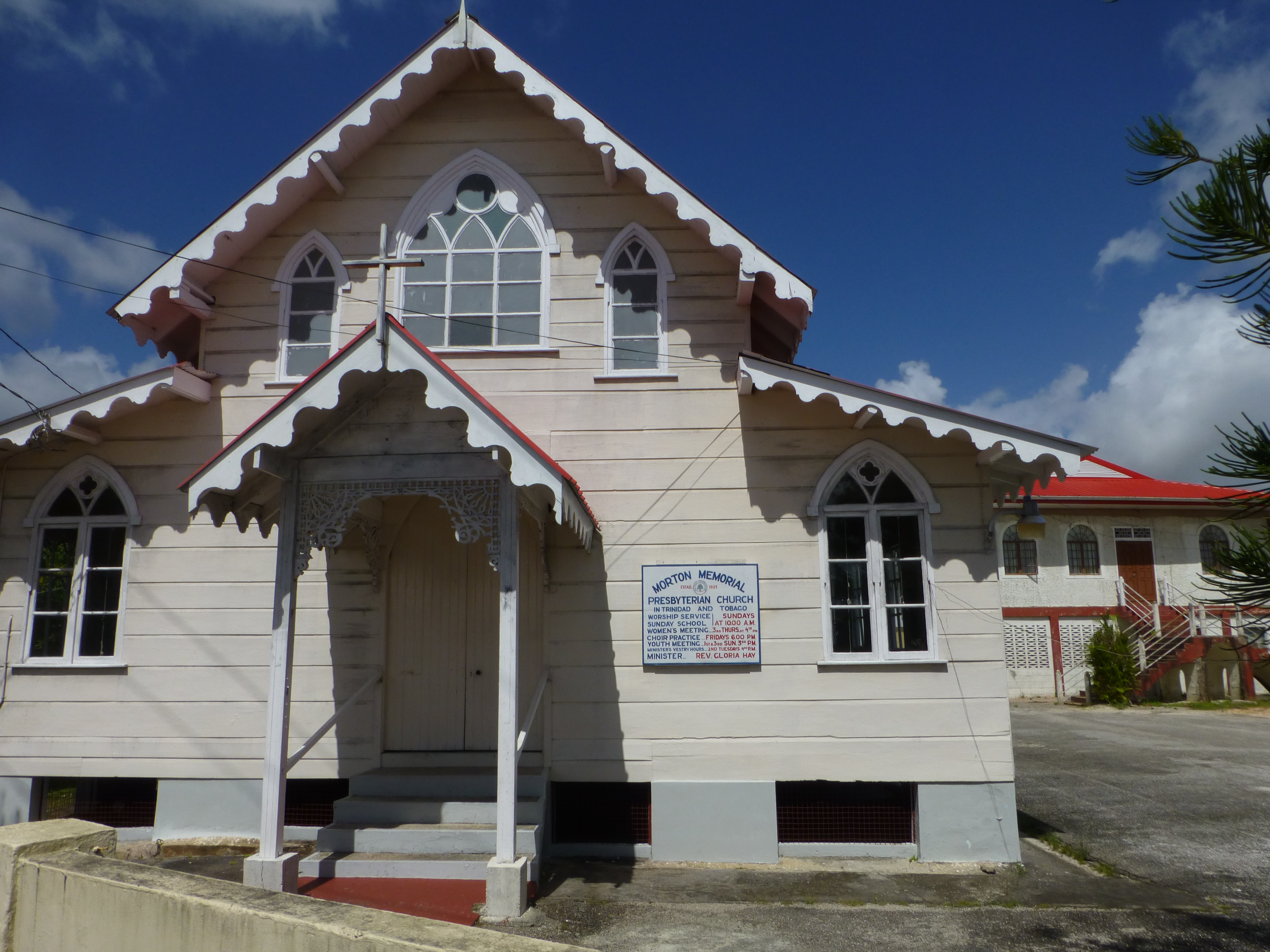
Morton Memorial Presbyterian Church
