= Freeport, Trinidad and Tobago =

Freeport
- Town
- Location within Trinidad and Tobago Location within the Caribbean Location within North America
- Coordinates: 10°27′N 61°25′W
- Country: Trinidad and Tobago
- Region: (Couva–Tabaquite–Talparo) Couva-Tabaquite-Talparo
- Established: 1797

Population (2011)
  - Total: 11,850
- Time zone: UTC−4 (AST)
- Area code: +1 (868) 673

Freeport is a town in the Republic of Trinidad and Tobago. It is located in west-central Trinidad, and is administered by the Couva–Tabaquite–Talparo Regional Corporation. It has a population of 11,850.

The estimated terrain elevation above sea level is 27 metres.
