= Petit Trou =

Town in Trinidad and Tobago

Coordinates: 10°50′N 60°56′W

Petit Trou is a small town in the northeast of Trinidad. It is the closest town in Trinidad to Tobago, which lies only 19 kilometers to the north. It is near Galera Point, the easternmost point in Trinidad.
