= Penal =

- Town
- Penal (Trinidad and Tobago)
- Coordinates: 10°10′N 61°28′W
- Country: Trinidad and Tobago
- Region: Penal–Debe
- Settled: c. 1900

Government
  - Councilor: Shanty Boodram
  - Member of Parliament: Kamla Persad-Bissessar (Siparia); Lackram Persad Bodoe (Oropouche West); Roodal Moonilal (Oropouche East)

Population (2011)
  - Total: 12,281
- Ranked 10th
- Time zone: UTC−4 (AST)
- Postal Code: 71xxxx
- Area code: 868
- Telephone Exchange: 647

Penal is a town in south Trinidad, Trinidad and Tobago. It lies south of San Fernando, Princes Town, and Debe, and north of Moruga, Morne Diablo and Siparia. Penal is noted as a heartland of Hindu and Indo-Trinidadian culture.

== History ==
Up to the 19th century the area was called Peñeraal by the then Spanish government. After British colonization it remained uninhabited until the late 19th century to around the early 20th century when former Indian indentured laborers used the cash they received, in lieu of return passage to India, to buy and develop crown land, in what is today Penal, for agricultural use by draining the swampy land. They called it Pinjal in Trinidadian Hindustani and Pengyal in Tamil. The Penal Hindu Mandir was built in 1888 by Bairagi mahants of the Ramanandi Sampradaya from India. The Patiram Trace Shiva Lingam Mandir, a major Hindu pilgrimage site in Trinidad, was established at the turn of the century when a swayambhu (self-manifested) Shiva lingam emerged when the land was being cleared. By 1905, a Canadian Presbyterian Mission school and church was set up and a mosque and public cemetery in Batchyia Village were established.

Further development came in 1913, when the Trinidad Government Railway extended their route further south of San Fernando, allowing for agricultural produce from Penal to be transported elsewhere for sale.

In the 1930s oil was discovered around Penal, leading to the influx of Afro-Trinidadian and Tobagonian oil workers from around the country who established a settlement near the half-mile mark of Penal Rock Road. In 1939, a small power plant was built to supply the town with electricity and a dam was built to supply the facility with water. Also in 1939, Sunbeam Cinema was established primarily showing Bollywood films, while the Regent Cinema that came in the 1940s primarily showed Hollywood films.

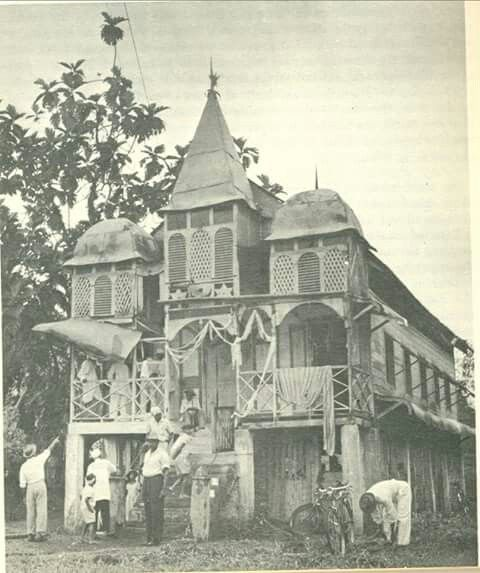
Penal mosque, ca. 1950

In the 1950s a market was built replacing the makeshift one at Penal Junction. In 1962 Penal broke from the Siparia Parish with the establishment of a Roman Catholic church and school in Penal. A government primary and junior secondary school were later established. Several Hindu and Muslim denominational schools came after. The Sanatan Dharma Maha Sabha established the Shiva Boys' Secondary School in 2001. From the 1960s to 1980s, Penal continued to grow, becoming a centre for rice and cocoa production and the nearby oil fields. In 1990, Penal ceased to be part of the Ward of Siparia and became incorporated into the Penal-Debe Regional Corporation. Penal is now a rapidly expanding and developing town, and a major commercial centre and cultural hub of south Trinidad. The population is 12,281.

== Government ==
The communities of Abdool Village, Aquart Village, Backar Yard, Bakhen, Batchyia Village, Boodoo Trace, Clarke Road, Charlo Village, Digity Trace, Dil Mohammed/Dabiedial Road, Goodman Trace, Gopie Trace, La Costena Gardens, Mendez Village, Katwaroo Trace, Lachoos Road, Laltoo Trace, Mohess Road, Mulchan Tace, Patiram Trace, Penal Junction (Penal Proper), Penal Rock-Bunsee Trace Village, Penal Quinam Road Village, Plantanite Trace, Rochard Road, Sadhoowa, Sou Sou Lands, Suchit Trace, Sunrees Road, Syne Village, Tulsa Trace, and Wilson Road are located in Penal.

Penal is administered by the Penal–Debe Regional Corporation. Penal is a part of the Siparia and Oropouche West parliamentary constituencies.

== Economy ==
The heart of Penal contains many businesses while the outskirts focus on agricultural development. Penal has a market, police station, branches of three banks (Scotiabank, Republic Bank and First Citizens Bank) health facilities, grocery stores, convenience stores, bars, fast food restaurants, service stations, restaurants, puja stores, an Indian expo, and clothing stores.

Penal plays a major role in the energy supply to the nation's populace. Petrotrin, the national oil company, has a major sub-unit in Clarke Road and the National Gas Company has gas lines running through Penal that links the gas fields of the South East Coast and the industrial estates. One of the countries three major power generating plants owned by Powergen Ltd is located at Syne Village to the west of Penal.

== Sports ==
The Trinidad and Tobago national cricket team have played matches holding first-class and List A status at the Wilson Road Recreation Ground.

== Notable residents ==
- Kamla Persad-Bissessar – Seventh Prime Minister of Trinidad and Tobago
- Drupatee Ramgoonai – Chutney and Chutney Soca singer
- David Williams – cricketer
