= Arnos Vale, Trinidad and Tobago =

Town in Trinidad and Tobago

Coordinates: 11°13′N 60°45′W

Arnos Vale is a town on Tobago close to Plymouth.
