= San Juan–Laventille =

- Region
- Region of San Juan–Laventille
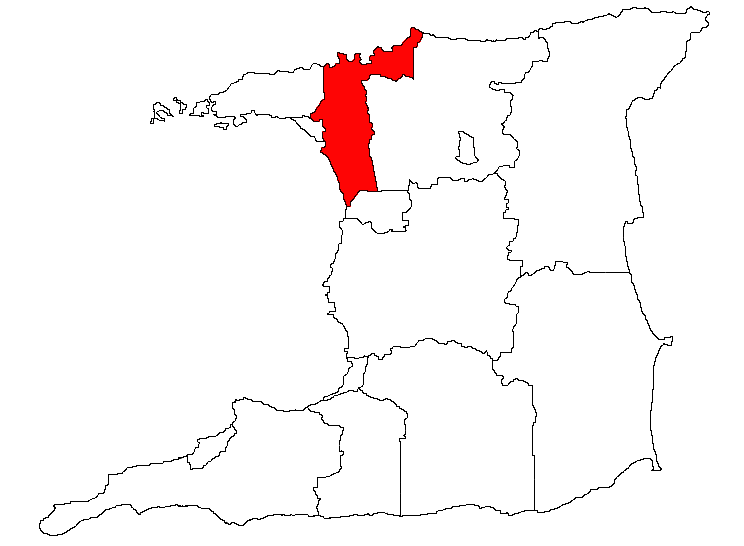
- Coordinates: 10°39′00″N 61°29′00″W
- Country: Trinidad and Tobago
- Former Regions: San Juan; Laventille
- Founded: 17 July 1992

Government
  - Body: San Juan-Laventille Regional Corporation
  - Chairman: Alderman Anthony Roberts

Area
  - Total: 220.39 km^{2} (85.09 sq mi)

Population (2011)
  - Total: 157,258
  - Density: 713.54/km^{2} (1,848.1/sq mi)
- Time zone: UTC-4 (AST)

San Juan–Laventille is a region of Trinidad. It has a land area of 220.39 km^{2}. The San Juan–Laventille Regional Corporation is headquartered at MTS Plaza in Aranguez, San Juan. Other urban areas include Barataria, Laventille, Morvant and San Juan. It is the smallest region in Trinidad. The region is bordered by Port of Spain in the west to St. Joseph in the east.

== Areas ==
- Maracas Bay/Santa Cruz/La Fillette
- Febeau/Bourg Mulatresse
- Morvant
- Caledonia/Upper Malick
- San Juan West
- St. Ann's/Cascade/Mon Repos West
- St. Barb's/Chinapoo
- Beetham/Picton
- Success/Trou Macaque
- Aranguez/Warner Village
- Barataria
- Petit Bourg/Champ Fleurs/Mt. Lambert
- San Juan East
