= Debe =

Debe Débé
- Town
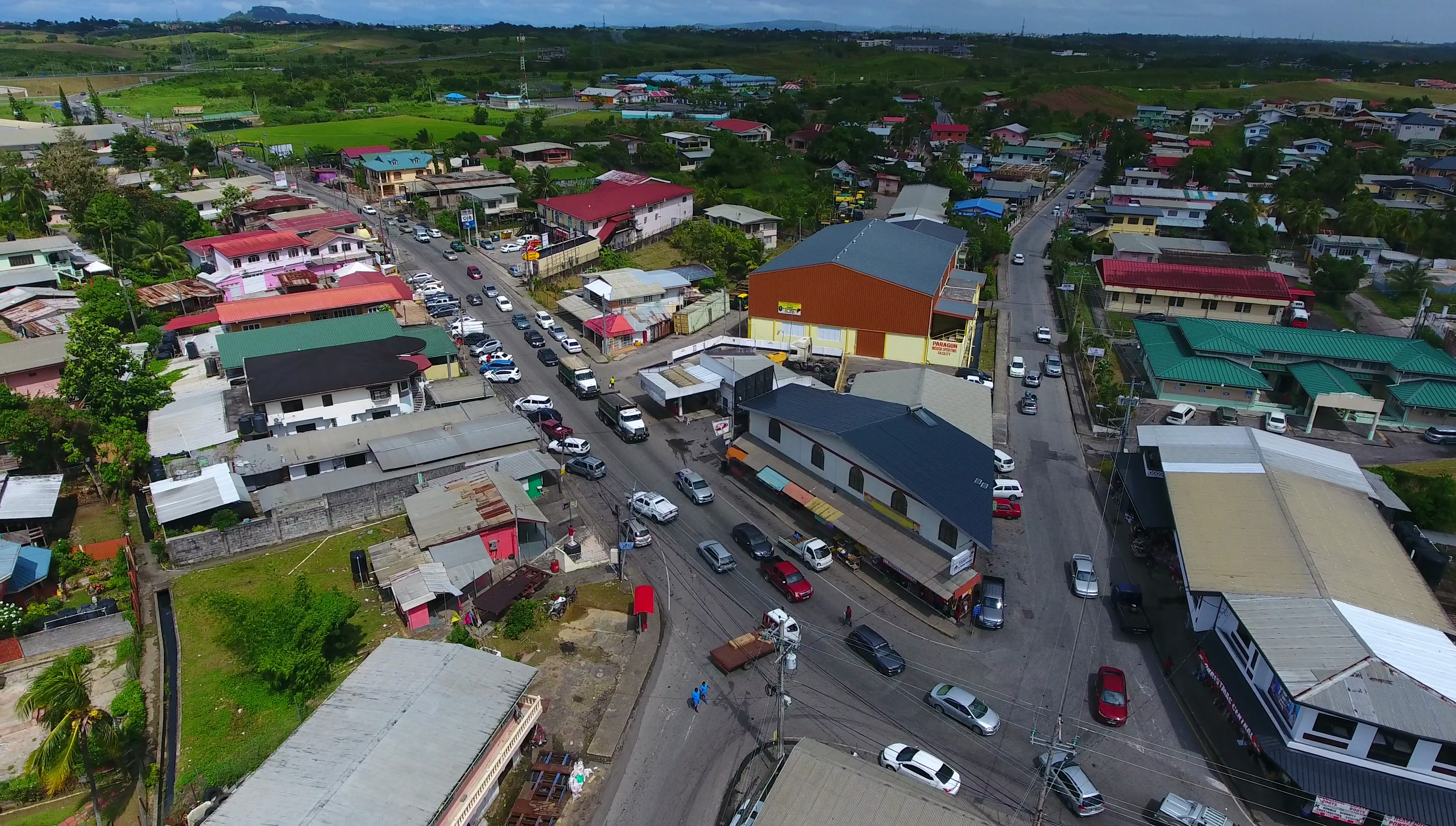
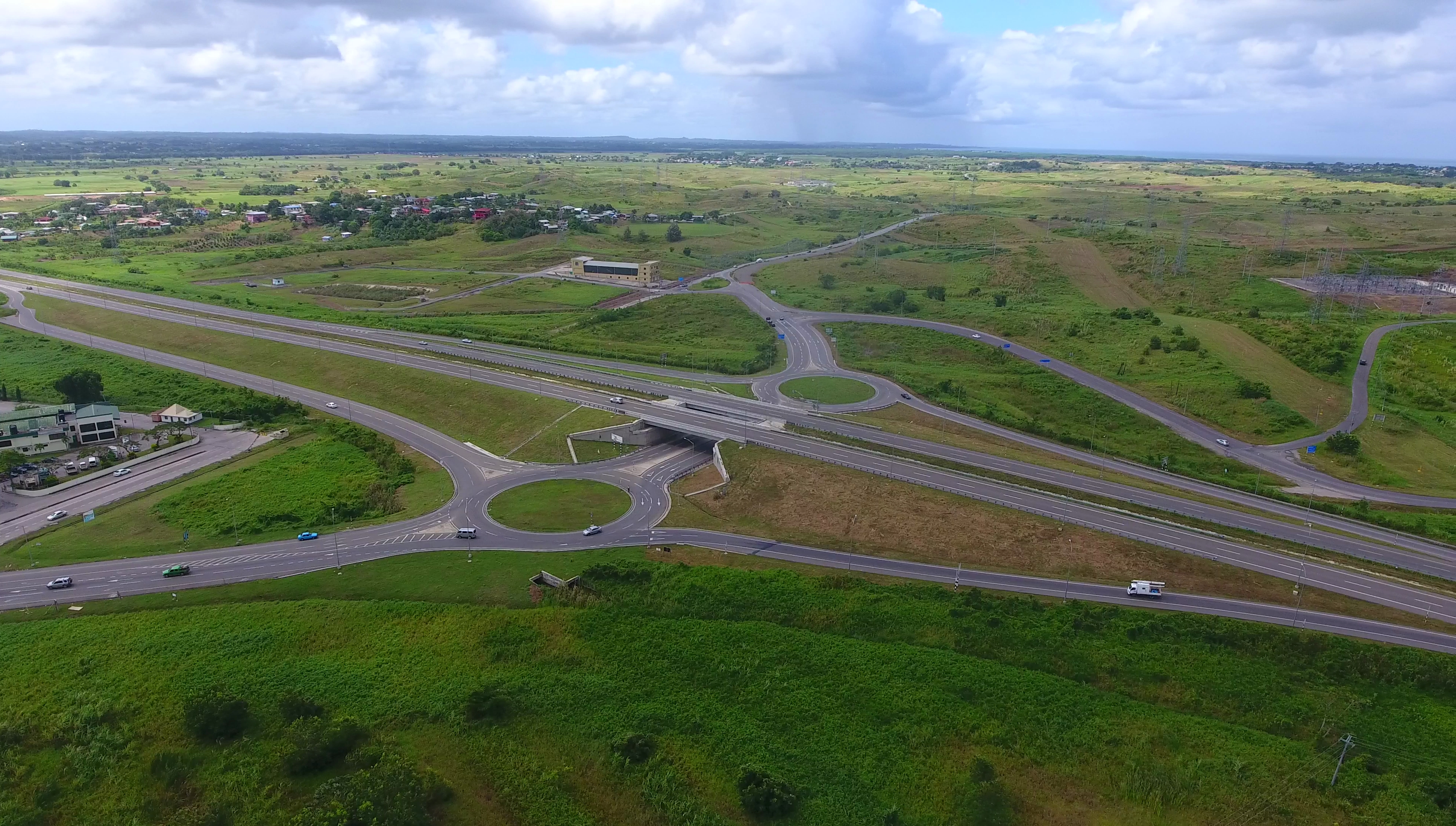
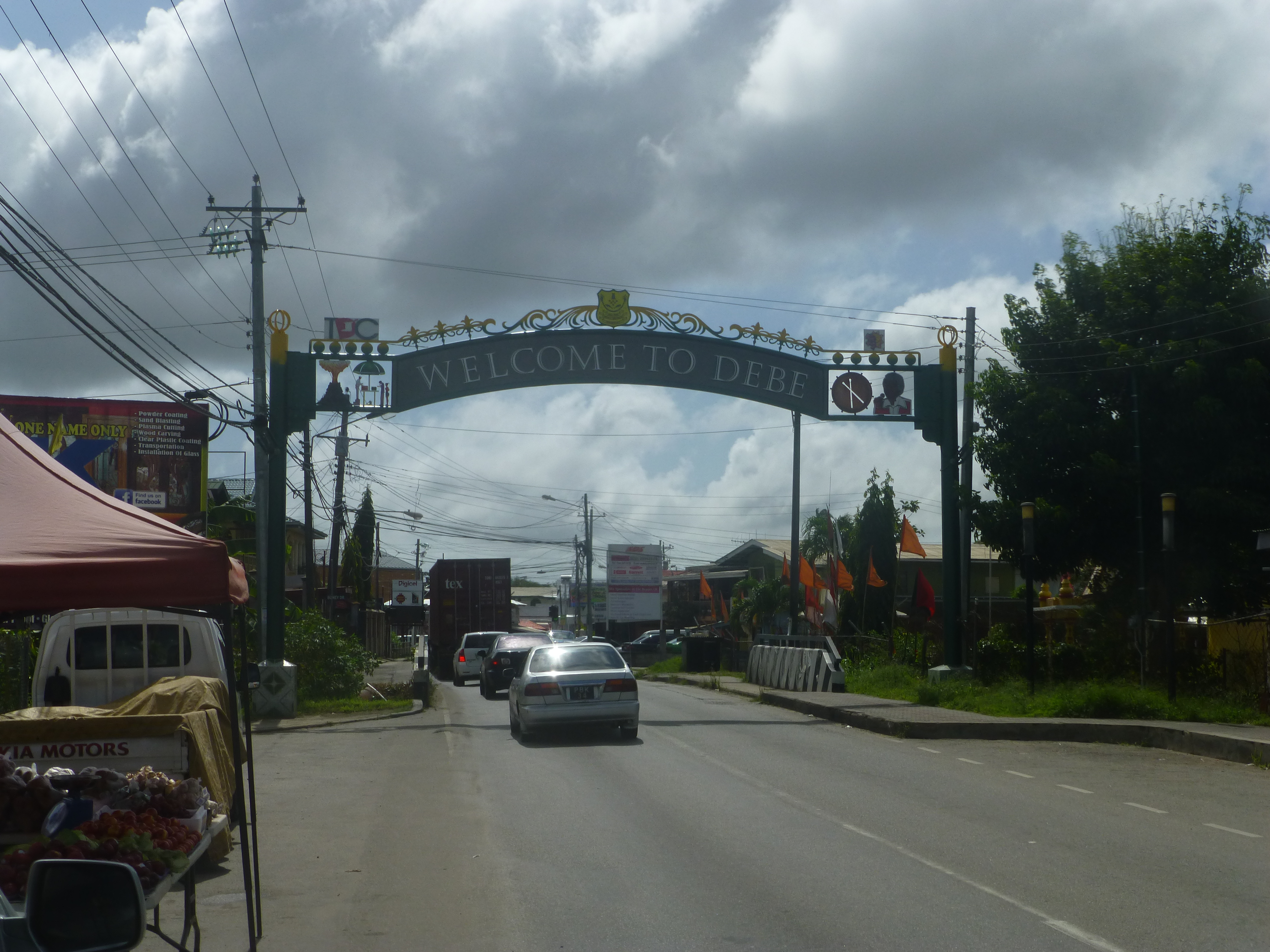

- Debe (Trinidad and Tobago)
- Coordinates: 10°19′N 61°43′W
- Country: Trinidad and Tobago
- Region: Penal–Debe
- Settled: c. 1875-80 (Note: Gandhi Village which is part of Debe today was first settled c. 1875-80, while Debe proper was first settled c. 1900.)

Government
  - Member of Parliament: Roodal Moonilal (Oropouche East); Lackram Persad Bodoe (Oropouche West)

Population (2016)
  - Total: 7,200
- Time zone: UTC−4 (AST)
- Postal Code: 66xxxx
- Area code: 868
- Official language: English

Debe (or Débé) is a town in south Trinidad located in the region of Penal–Debe. Debe has grown from a small settlement into a key transit point which as has merged to some extent with Penal. A denomination high school was established by the Sanatan Dharma Maha Sabha (Parvati Girls College). Debe had initially gained importance as a train stop during sugar cane production. However with the closure of the sugar industry Debe continued to be widely known for doubles and other delicacies. The area has also gained prominence for its wholesale marketing of agricultural produce in government managed Namdevco, which is the largest wholesale market in the country. Chutney music is believed to have originated in the Barrackpore-Debe-Penal area.

In 2013 the Sir Solomon Hochoy Highway extension to Debe was successfully opened to intersect with the SS Erin Main Road and the M2 Ring Road making the area a key transit point. In 2012 construction begun on the south campus of the University of the West Indies.

Debe is administered by the Penal–Debe Regional Corporation.

== Gallery ==
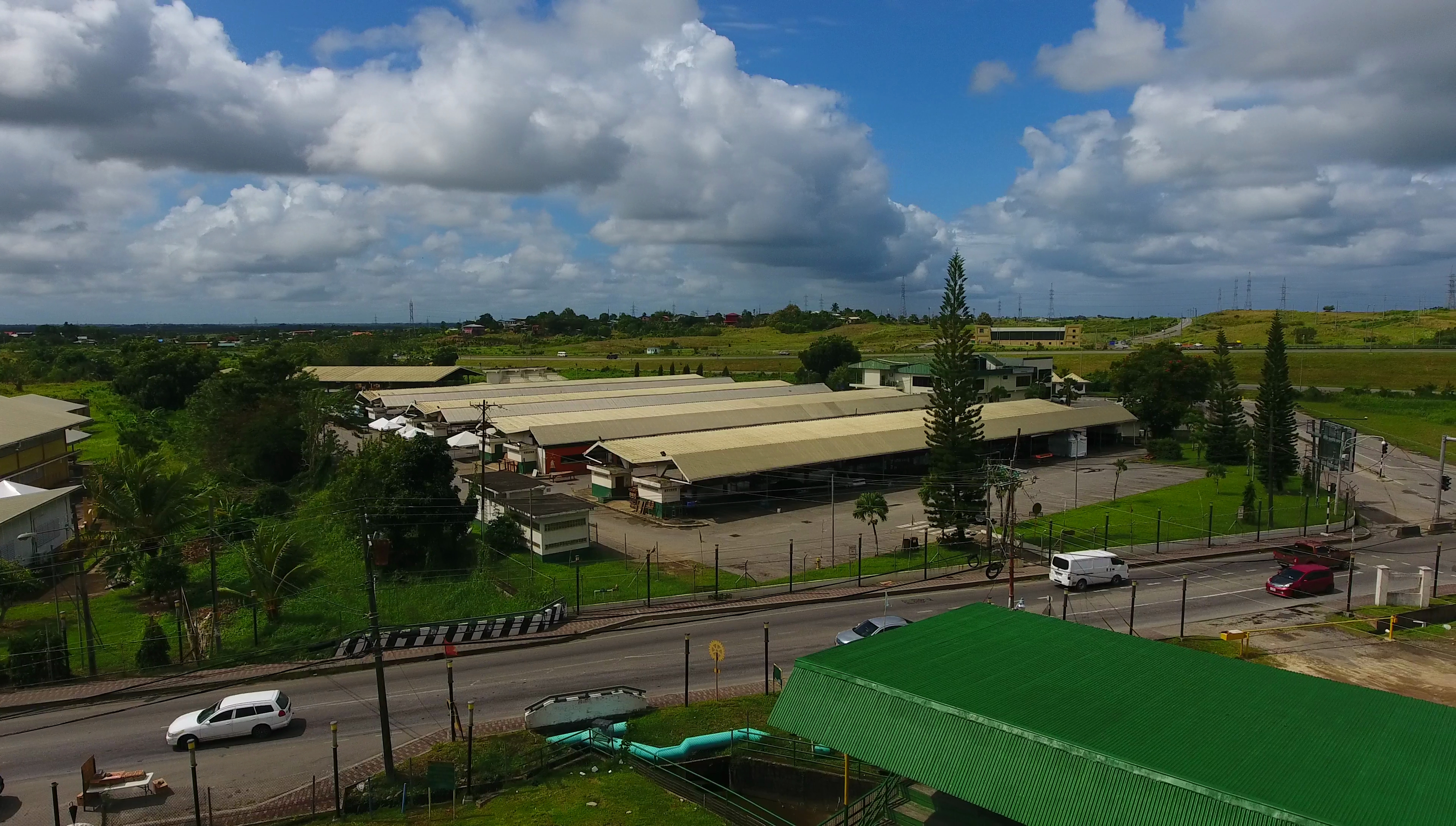
Debe market

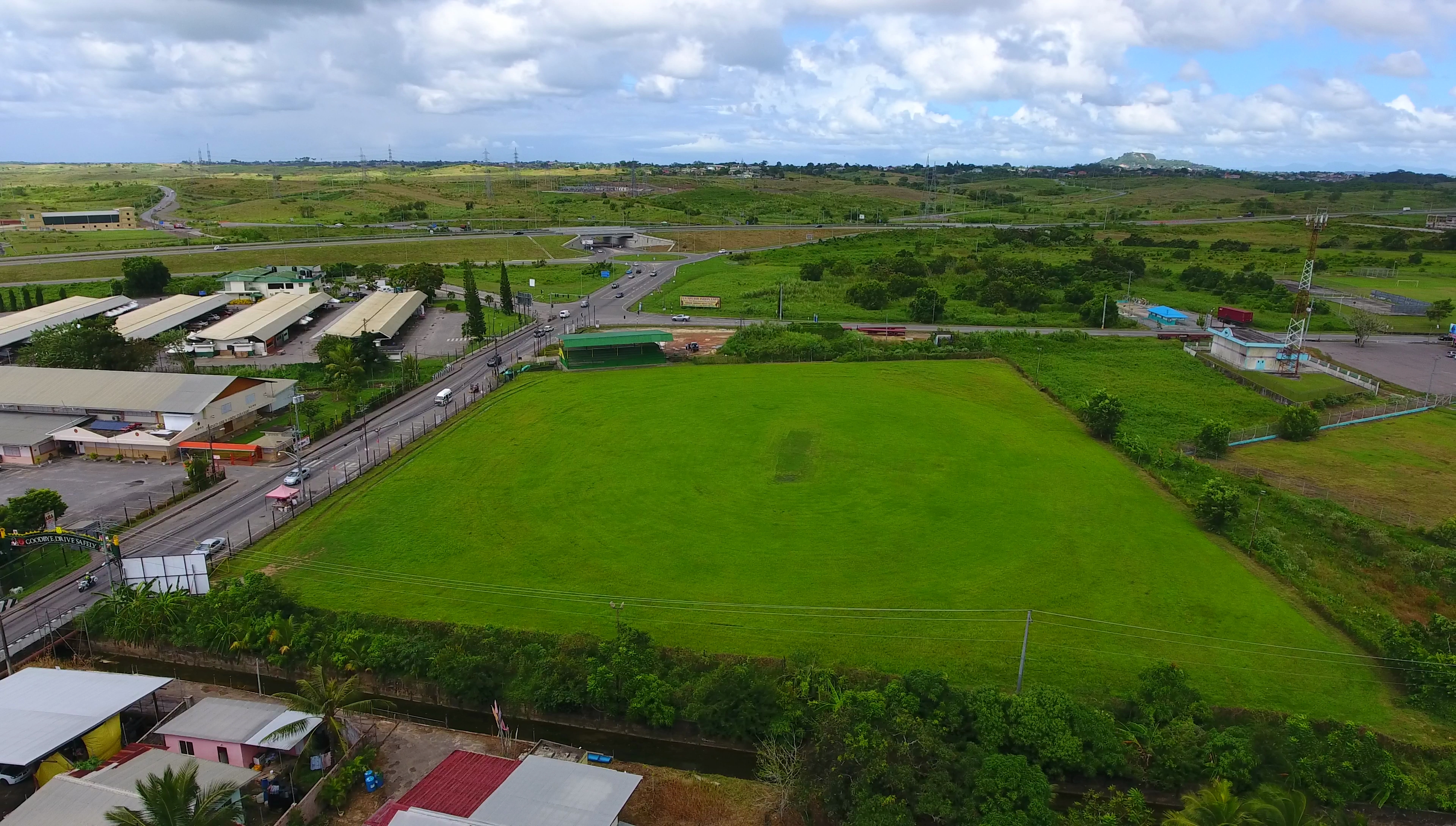
Francis Seupaul Recreation Ground

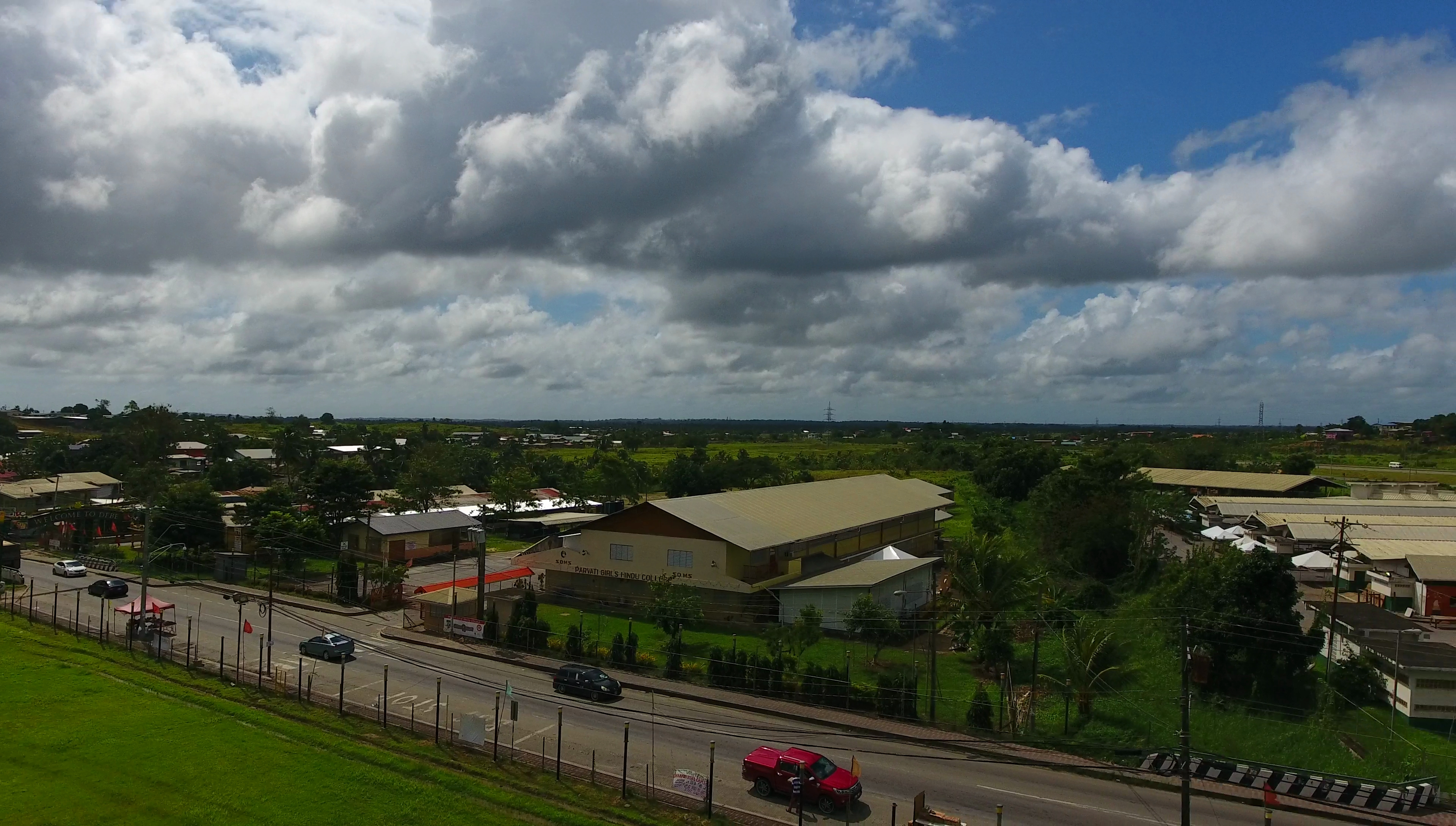
Parvati Girls' Hindu College

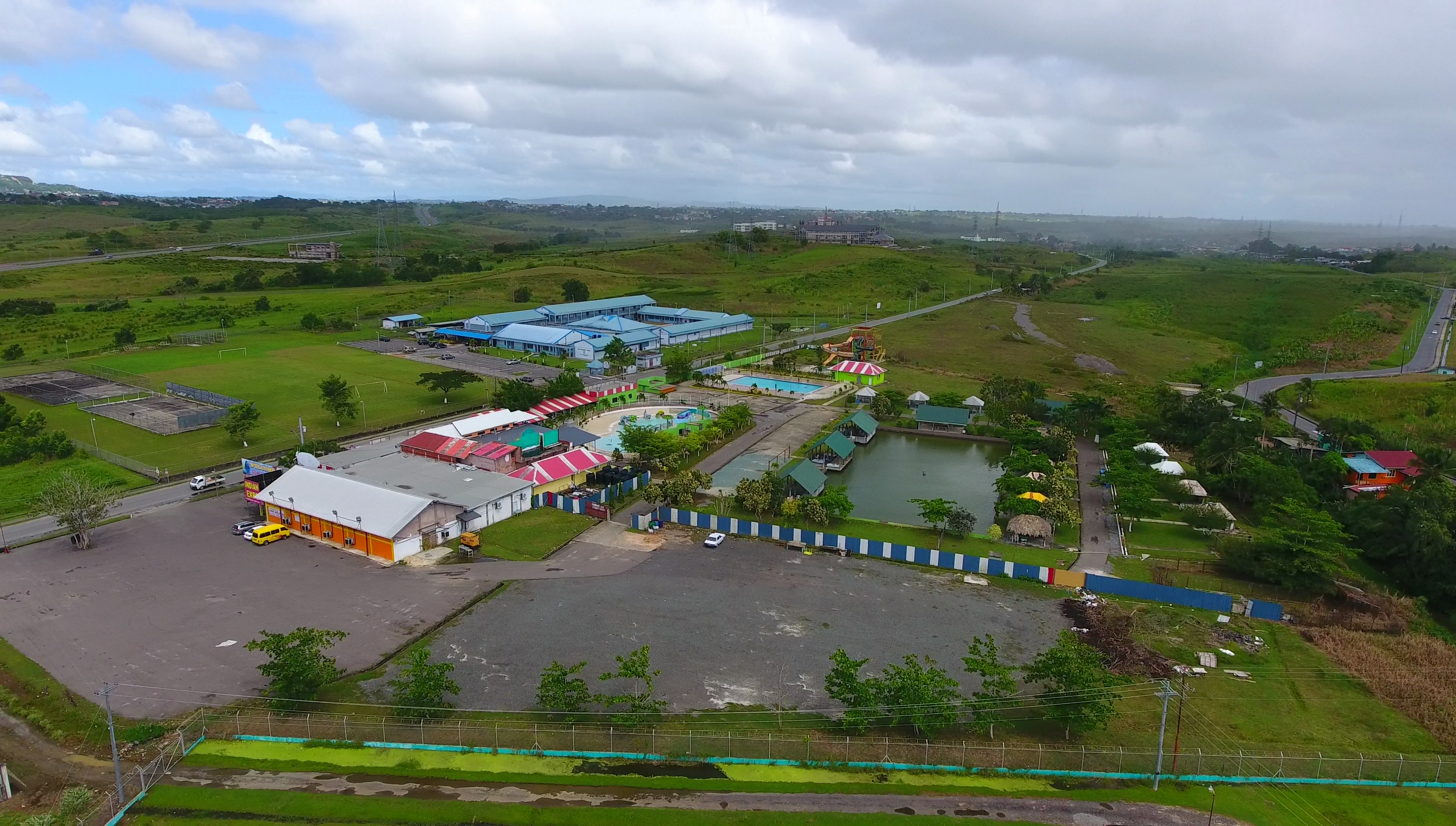
Fun Splash Water Park and Debe Secondary School

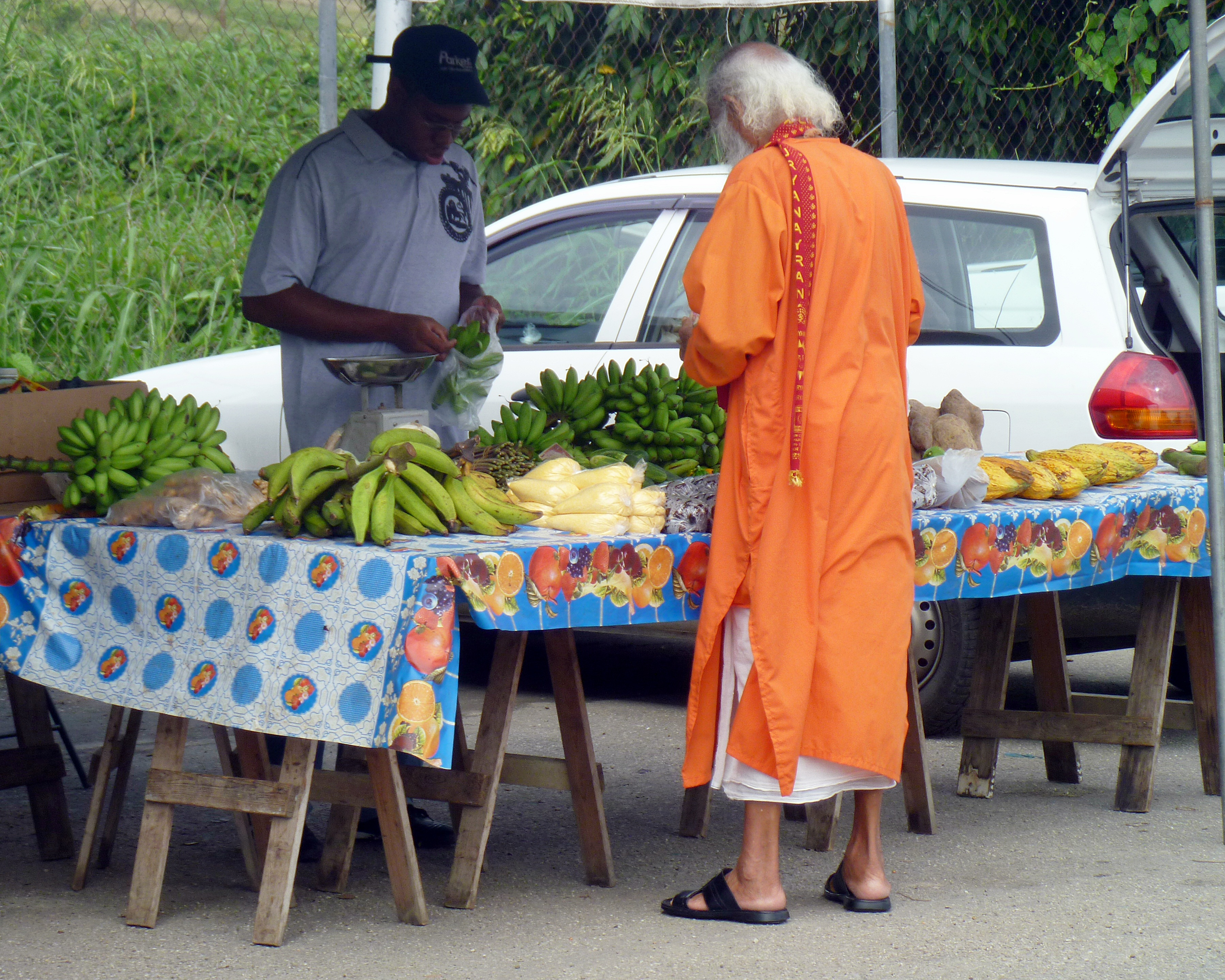
A sadhu purchasing vegetables in Debe Market
