= Roxborough, Trinidad and Tobago =

Coordinates: 11°15′N 60°35′W

Roxborough
- Town
- Interactive map of Roxborough
- Country: Trinidad and Tobago
- Jurisdiction: Tobago House of Assembly

Population (2011)
  - Total: 2,089
- Time zone: UTC−4 (AST)

Roxborough is a town in Trinidad and Tobago, Located at the southern shore of the island of Tobago, it has a population of 2,089 (2011).

== History ==
The settlement was named after the cocoa plantation Roxborough Estate.

== See also ==
- List of cities and towns in Trinidad and Tobago
