= Princes Town (region) =

Coordinates: 10°16′N 61°22′W

Princes Town PTRC
- Region
- Region of Princes Town
- logo
- Motto: Serving with Commitment and Compassion.
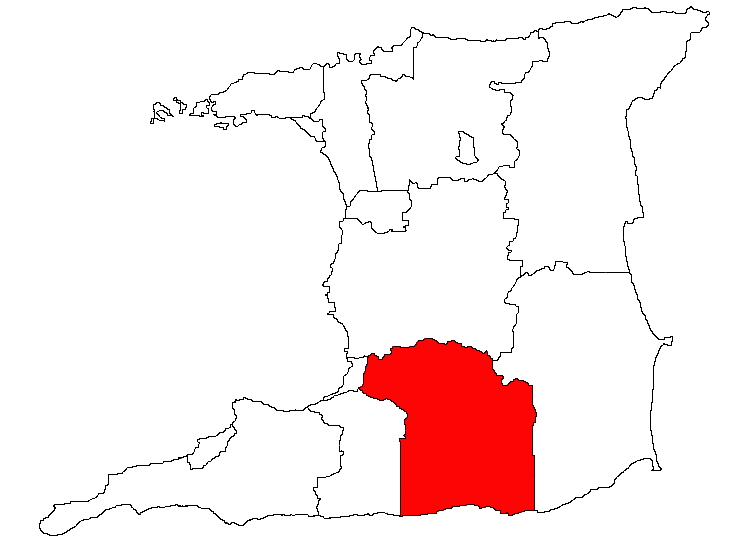
- Location of Princes Town in Trinidad
- Country: Trinidad and Tobago
- Region: South Trinidad
- Counties: Victoria
- Coastline: Columbus Channel
- Founded: 13 September 1990
- Capital: Princes Town

Area
  - Total: 620 km^{2} (240 sq mi)

Population (2011)
  - Total: 102,375
  - Density: 170/km^{2} (430/sq mi)
- Time zone: UTC-4 (Atlantic Standard Time)
  - Summer (DST): UTC-4 (No daylight saving time)
- Area code: +1 (868) 650, 654, 655, 656. 832
- ISO 3166 code: TT-PRT

Princes Town is a region of Trinidad and Tobago. The local government body is Princes Town Regional Corporation, a Regional Corporation of Trinidad and Tobago. The region has a land area of 620 km^{2}. The Princes Town Regional Corporation is headquartered in Princes Town.

Electoral Districts in Princes Town Regional Corporation are:

- Ben Lomond/Hardbargain/Williamsville
- Corinth/Cedar Hill
- Fifth Company
- Hindustan/St. Marys
- Inverness/Princes Town South
- Lengua/Indian Walk
- Moruga
- New Grant/Tableland
- Reform/Manahambre
- St. Juliens/Princes Town North

It falls within the constituencies of Naparima, Princes Town, Moruga/Tableland and San Fernando East.
