= Sangre Grande (region) =

- Region
- Region of Sangre Grande
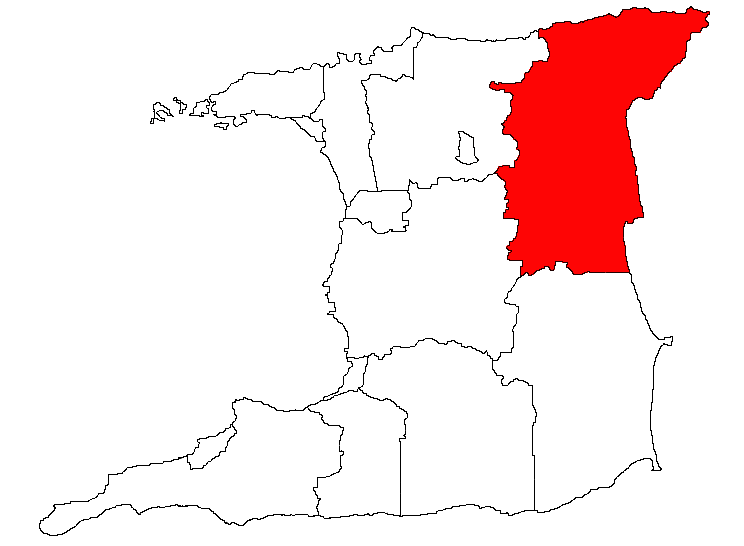
- Country: Trinidad and Tobago
- Founded: 13 September 1990

Government
  - Chairman: Anil Juteram

Area
  - Total: 927 km^{2} (358 sq mi)

Population (2011)
  - Total: 75,766
  - Density: 82/km^{2} (210/sq mi)
- Demonym: Sangre Grandian
- Time zone: UTC-4 (AST)

Sangre Grande is a region of Trinidad. The Region of Sangre Grande is a local government body and the largest Region of Trinidad and Tobago by area. The region has a land area of 898.94 km^{2}. The Sangre Grande Regional Corporation is headquartered in Sangre Grande. Other urban areas within include Guaico, Toco and Valencia. For the Council Term of 2013–2016 the Sangre Grande Regional Corporation was expanded to include one additional Electoral District.

== Demographics ==
=== Ancestry ===
Region of Sangre Grande racial breakdown
Racial composition	2011
South Asian (Indo-Trinidadian)	31.03%
Black (Afro-Trinidadian/Tobagonian)	30%
Multiracial	22.9%
Dougla (South Asian and Black)	12.8%
White Trinidadian	0.09%
Native American (Amerindian)	0.1%
East Asian (Chinese)	0.1%
Arab (Syrian/Lebanese)	0.006%
Other	0.09%
Not stated	2.5%

== Politics ==
For elections to the Parliament of Trinidad and Tobago, the region is part of the Toco/Sangre Grande parliamentary constituency.
