= Regions and municipalities of Trinidad and Tobago =

Regions, municipalities and wards of Trinidad and Tobago
- Location: Trinidad and Tobago
- Created: 1990
- Number: 15

Trinidad and Tobago is divided into seven regions, five boroughs, two cities and one ward.

== Trinidad ==
The following are the municipalities and regions created after the amendment of Act No. 8 of 1992:

Municipalities of Trinidad
Municipality	Status	Land area		Population (2011)	Population density	
Municipality	Status	km^{2}	sq mi	Population (2011)	/km^{2}	/sq mi
Port of Spain	City	12	4.6	37,074	3,090	8,000
San Fernando	City	19	7.3	48,838	2,570	6,700
Chaguanas	Borough	59	23	83,516	1,416	3,670
Arima	Borough	12	4.6	33,606	2,801	7,250
Point Fortin	Borough	25	9.7	20,235	809	2,100
Diego Martin	Borough	126	49	102,957	817	2,120
Siparia	Borough	495	191	86,949	176	460

Regions of Trinidad
Region	Land area		Population (2011)	Population density		Regional Capital
Region	km^{2}	sq mi	Population (2011)	/km^{2}	/sq mi	Regional Capital
Couva–Tabaquite–Talparo	723	279	178,410	247	640	Couva
Mayaro–Rio Claro	814	314	35,650	44	110	Rio Claro
Penal–Debe	246	95	89,392	363	940	Penal
Princes Town	620	240	102,375	165	430	Princes Town
San Juan–Laventille	239	92	157,258	658	1,700	San Juan
Sangre Grande	927	358	75,766	82	210	Sangre Grande
Tunapuna–Piarco	510	200	215,119	422	1,090	Tunapuna

The following regions were merged after the amendment of Act No. 8 of 1992:

Regions
Dissolved Regions	Consolidated Region
Couva	Couva–Tabaquite–Talparo
Tabaquite–Talparo	Couva–Tabaquite–Talparo
Mayaro	Mayaro–Rio Claro
Rio Claro	Mayaro–Rio Claro
Tunapuna	Tunapuna–Piarco
Piarco	Tunapuna–Piarco
San Juan	San Juan–Laventille
Laventille	San Juan–Laventille

Before 1990, Trinidad was divided into eight counties.

== Tobago ==
Tobago parishes map

Tobago is a ward of Trinidad and Tobago and is governed locally by the Tobago House of Assembly.

Historically, Tobago was divided into seven parishes (Saint Andrew, Saint David, Saint George, Saint John, Saint Mary, Saint Patrick and Saint Paul). In 1768 each parish of Tobago had nominated representatives to the Tobago House of Assembly. On 20 October 1889 the British crown implemented a Royal Order in Council constituting Tobago as a ward of Trinidad, thus terminating local government on Tobago and formed a unified colony government.

In 1945 when the county council system was first introduced, Tobago was administered as a single county of Trinidad.

In 1980 provisions were made for the Tobago House of Assembly to be revived as an entity providing local government in Tobago. Under the revived system, Tobago is made up of 15 local electoral districts since 2021, previously 12 districts, with each district electing one Assemblyman to the THA.

No.	Electoral districts
1	Bagatelle/Bacolet
2	Belle Garden/Glamorgan
3	Bethel/New Grange
4	Bethesda/Les Coteaux
5	Bon Accord/Crown Point
6	Buccoo/Mt. Pleasant
7	Darrel Spring/Whim
8	Lambeau/ Lowlands
9	Mason Hall/Moriah
10	Mt. St. George/Goodwood
11	Parlatuvier/L’Anse Fourmi/Speyside
12	Plymouth/Black Rock
13	Roxborough/Argyle
14	Scarborough/Mt. Grace
15	Signal Hill/Patience Hill

== See also ==
- ISO 3166-2:TT
- List of Caribbean First-level Subdivisions by Total Area
- Commonwealth Local Government Forum-Americas
