= Diego Martin (region) =

- Borough
- Borough of Diego Martin
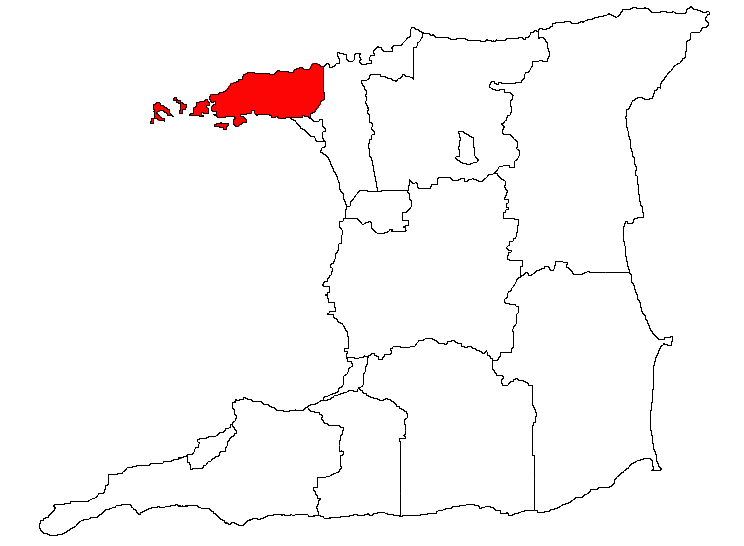
- Country: Trinidad and Tobago
- Founded: 13 September 1990
- Established as a Borough: 20th June 2023

Government
  - Body: Diego Martin Borough Corporation
  - Mayor: Alderman Akeliah Glasgow-Warner

Area
  - Total: 126 km^{2} (49 sq mi)

Population (2020)
  - Total: 150,000
  - Density: 1,200/km^{2} (3,100/sq mi)
- Time zone: UTC-4 (AST)

Diego Martin is a borough of Trinidad and Tobago. The region has a land area of 127.53 km^{2}. Urban areas within the region include Carenage, Diego Martin, Maraval and parts of Saint James. The local government body is the Diego Martin Borough Corporation (formerly known as the Diego Martin Regional Corporation).

On Thursday 19 November 2020, while addressing the public on the re-opening of the Diego Martin South Community Centre, Prime Minister and MP for Diego Martin West Dr Keith Rowley announced that Diego Martin, along with Siparia, would be elevated to borough status in 2021. Both Diego Martin and Siparia were declared boroughs in 2023.

In the Parliament of Trinidad and Tobago, Miscellaneous Provisions (Establishment of the Borough of Diego Martin and the Borough of Siparia) Act, No. 6 or 2023 was assented to and enacted by Parliament on June 09, 2023 and same was proclaimed into operation by Her Excellency Christine Carla Kangaloo, President of the Republic of Trinidad and Tobago, on June 20, 2023.

== Demographics ==
=== Ancestry ===
Diego Martin racial breakdown
| Racial composition | 2011 |
|---|---|
| African (Afro-Trinidadian) | 42.9% |
| Multiracial | 26.9% |
| South Asian (Indo-Trinidadian) | 9.3% |
| Dougla (South Asian and Black) | 8.5% |
| White Trinidadian | 4.7% |
| Chinese | 1% |
| Native American (Amerindian) | 0.1% |
| Arab (Syrian/Lebanese) | 0.5% |
| Other | 0.5% |
| Not stated | 5.2% |

== Elected Areas (Districts) ==
- Morne Coco/Alyce Glen
- Glencoe/Goodwood/La Puerta
- Moka/Boissiere #2
- St. Lucien/Cameron
- Bagatelle/Blue Basin
- Covigne/Rich Plain
- Diamond Vale
- Cocorite/Petit Valley
- Belle Vue/Boisierre #1
- Chaguaramas/Point Cumana
