= Penal–Debe =

Penal–Debe PDRC
- Region
- Penal–Debe Regional Corporation
- Motto: Forward in Unity
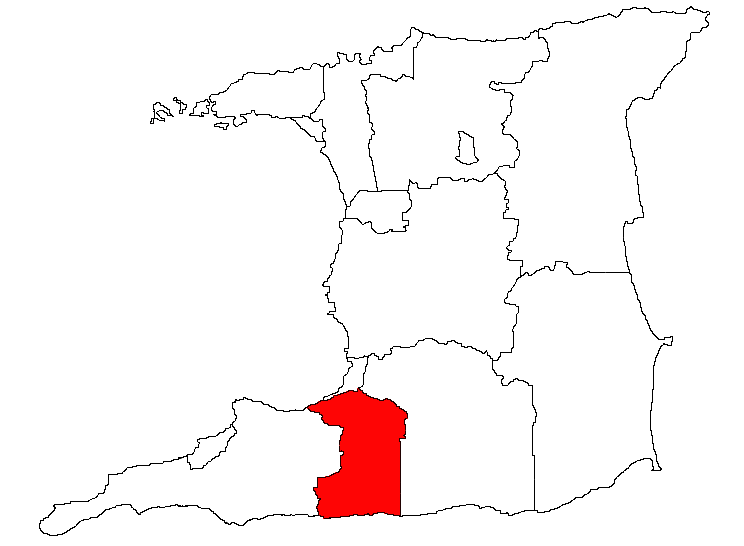
- Coordinates: 10.169°N 61.431°W
- Country: Trinidad and Tobago
- Founded: 13 September 1990
- Capital: Penal

Government
  - Body: Penal–Debe Regional Corporation
  - Chairman: Gowtam Maharaj

Area
  - Total: 246.91 km^{2} (95.33 sq mi)

Population (2011 census)
  - Total: 89,392
  - Density: 363/km^{2} (940/sq mi)
- Time zone: UTC-4 (AST)
- Website: pdrctt.org

Penal–Debe region is a region of Trinidad. The local government body is Penal–Debe Regional Corporation, a Regional Corporation of Trinidad and Tobago. The region has a land area of 246.91 km². Urban areas within Penal–Debe include Penal, where the corporation is headquartered, and Debe. The region is noted as a heartland of Indo-Trinidadian culture with Indians making up the vast majority of the region at 71% and the largest religion in the region being Hinduism at 43%.
