= Siparia (region) =

- Borough
- Borough of Siparia
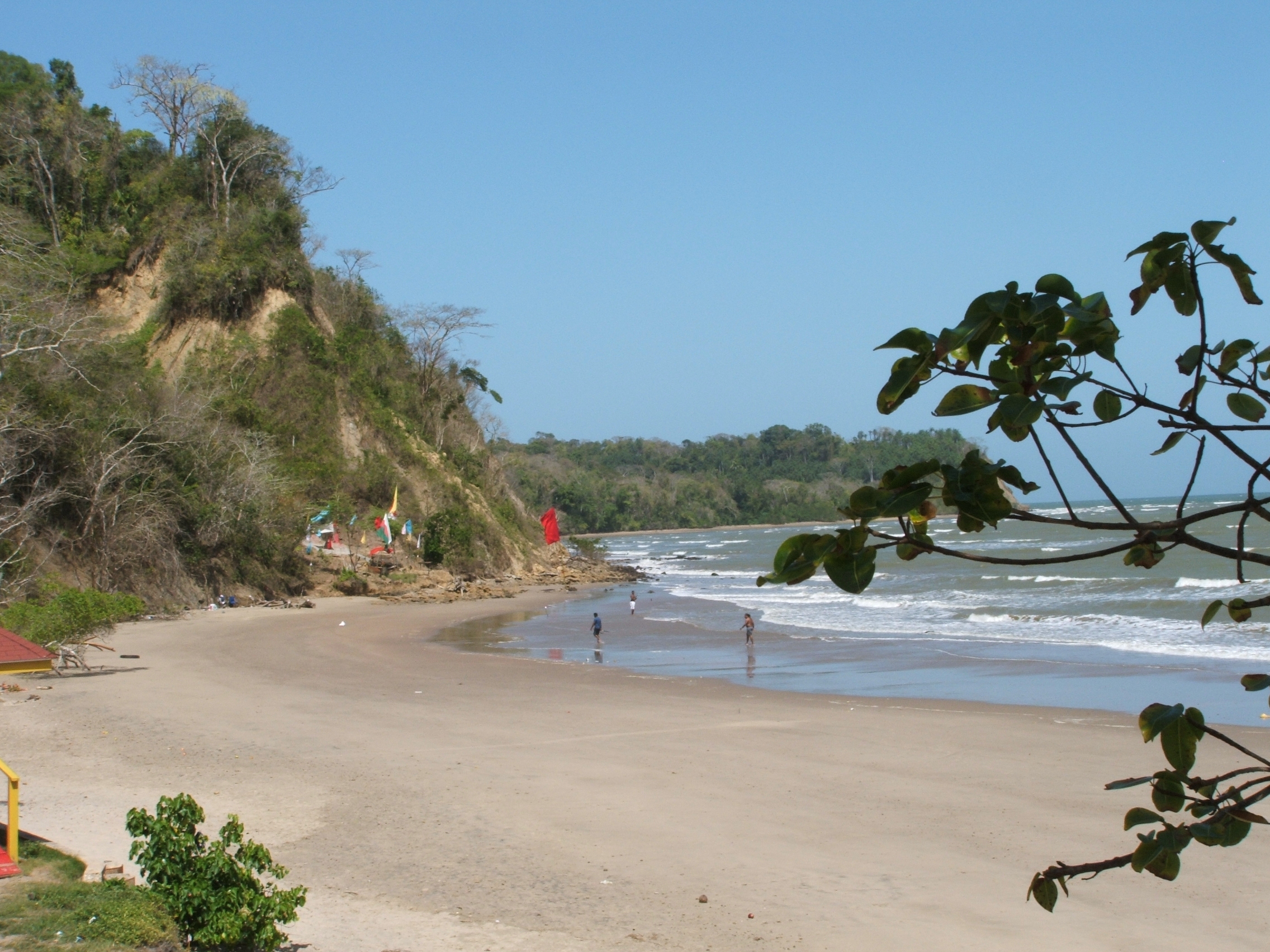
- Quinam Bay, Borough of Siparia

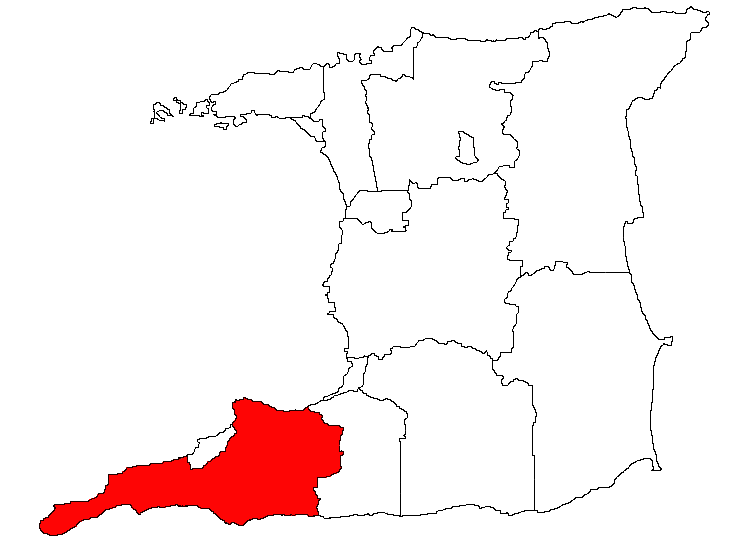
- Country: Trinidad and Tobago
- Founded: 13 September 1990
- Capital: Siparia

Government
  - Body: Siparia Borough Corporation
  - Mayor: Doodnath Mayrhoo

Area
  - Total: 495 km^{2} (191 sq mi)

Population (2011)
  - Total: 86,949
  - Density: 176/km^{2} (460/sq mi)
- Time zone: UTC-4 (AST)
- Area code: 868
- ISO 3166 code: TT-SIP

The Borough of Siparia is the fifth and newest Borough of the Republic of Trinidad and Tobago, located in the southwestern portion of the island, it is Trinidad and Tobago's southernmost borough. The Siparia Borough Corporation is headquartered in Siparia proper (downtown). Other urban areas include Cedros, Fyzabad, La Brea, Santa Flora, South Oropouche.

On Thursday 19 November 2020, while addressing the public on the re-opening of the Diego Martin South Community Centre, Prime Minister and MP for Diego Martin West Dr Keith Rowley announced that Siparia, along with Diego Martin, would be elevated to borough status in 2021. Both Siparia and Diego Martin were declared boroughs in 2023.

== Areas ==
- South Oropouche
- Cedros
- Siparia
- Santa Flora
- Fyzabad
- Erin
- La Brea
- Dow Village

== Demographics ==
=== Ancestry ===
Region of Siparia racial breakdown
Racial composition	2011
South Asian (Indo-Trinidadian)	43.6%
Black (Afro-Trinidadian/Tobagonian)	31.6%
Multiracial	14%
Dougla (South Asian and Black)	6.8%
East Asian (Chinese)	0.17%
Native American (Amerindian)	0.26%
Arab (Syrian/Lebanese)	0.017%
White Trinidadian	0.04%
Other	0.09%
Not stated	3.1%

== See also ==
- Point Fortin
