= Poole, Trinidad and Tobago =

Village in Trinidad and Tobago

Poole
- Village
- Interactive map of Poole
- Coordinates: 10°18′5.04″N 61°13′44.76″W
- Country: Trinidad and Tobago
- region: Mayaro–Rio Claro

Population (2011)
  - Total: 1,542

Poole is a village in Trinidad and Tobago, located in the Mayaro–Rio Claro region, in the valley of the Poole River.

== History ==
In 2025, Poole was affected by a major landslide.

== Transport ==
Poole is located on the Naparima-Mayaro Road between Rio Claro and Tableland.

== Politics ==
Poole is part of the Mayaro constituency for elections to the Parliament of Trinidad and Tobago.

== See also ==
- List of cities and towns in Trinidad and Tobago
