= Imran Jan =

Trinidadian cricketer (born 1979)

Personal information
- Full name: Imran Haniff Jan
- Born: 11 February 1979 (age 47); Mafeking, Trinidad and Tobago
- Batting: Left-handed
- Bowling: Right-arm off spin
- Role: All-rounder
- Relatives: Asif Jan (twin brother)

Domestic team information
- Years: Team
- 2000–2005: Trinidad and Tobago
- Source: CricketArchive, 27 December 2015

Imran Haniff Jan (born 11 February 1979) is a former Trinidadian cricketer who played for Trinidad and Tobago in West Indian domestic cricket. He was an all-rounder who bowled right-arm off spin and batted left-handed.

== Early life and career ==
Jan and his twin brother, Asif, were born in the village of Mafeking, in Trinidad's Mayaro district. He made his first-class debut for Trinidad and Tobago in January 2000, playing against Guyana in the 1999–00 Busta Cup. Jan had his breakout season during the 2001–02 Busta Cup, scoring 528 runs from seven matches to finish as his team's leading run-scorer (and fourth in the competition). Opening the batting with Andy Jackson against West Indies B, he scored what was to be his only first-class century, 110 runs from 199 balls. Jan scored 563 runs from eight matches in the 2002–03 Busta Cup, the seventh-most in the competition and behind only Daren Ganga for Trinidad and Tobago. As a bowler, his best performance came in the 2004–05 Regional One-Day Competition, where he took 13 wickets from seven matches to finish as the competition's leading wicket-taker.

On 21 August 2021, he was appointed as the head coach of Trinbago Knight Riders for the 2021 Caribbean Premier League, as Brendon McCullum was unavailable for the season.
