= Franklin Khan =

Trinidad and Tobago politician (died 2021)

Franklin Khan (died 17 April 2021) was a Trinidad and Tobago politician who served as Member of Parliament for Ortoire-Mayaro and Chairman of the ruling People's National Movement. In 2005, Khan was indicted on corruption charges, all of which were dropped in a court of law five years later.

He had been the first politician in Trinidad and Tobago to be indicted for corruption while his party was still in power. Khan was elected in 2002 on a PNM ticket, defeating incumbent Winston Peters. Between September 2002 and 8 May 2005 Khan served as Minister of Works, resigning in the face of bribery allegations levelled by PNM Councillor Dansam Dhansook, who is now under investigation for allegedly making false statements. Khan served as chairman of the PNM on two occasions, 2003 to 2005 and from 2011 to 2018

After having been cleared of all accusations, Mr. Khan was expected to resume his career in politics.

He has continued with his career and has held the following portfolios.

Minister of Energy and Energy Industries and Chairman of the Peoples National Movement PNM - 19 August 2020 - 17 April 2021

Minister of Energy and Energy Industries - 31 October 2016 - 9 August 2020

Minister of Rural Development and Local Government 11 September 2015 - 30 October 2016

Government Member - 4 May 2005 - 28 September 2007

Minister of Works and Transport - 15 October 2002 - 13 May 2005

He died on the morning of Sunday 17 April 2021.
