= List of Miss Grand International 2023 preliminary contests =

Miss Grand International 2023's national preliminary pageants

MGI 2023 Participants classified by selection methods:
1. A1: Miss Grand National pageant winners: 34 (48.6%)
2. A2: Other 2023 national pageant main winners: 5 (7.14%)
3. B1: Won Miss Grand as supplemental title: 4 (5.71%)
4. B2: Appointed from other 2023 pageants: 3 (4.29%)
5. C1: Casting/audition: 1 (1.43%)
6. C2: Appointed, no pageant held: 23 (32.9%)

The 11th edition of the Miss Grand International pageant was held at the Phú Thọ Indoor Stadium in Ho Chi Minh City, Vietnam on October 25, 2023, in which candidates from 71 countries and territories participated. These candidates were elected as the country representatives through different methods, such as through the Miss Grand National which was held to select the country representative for Miss Grand International specifically, or appointed by another national pageant organizer, in which the main winner was sent to compete on other international stages. Some of them were assigned as the representatives without competing at any national pageant in this particular year.

== Overview ==
As per data collected in the National preliminary contest section, 48 national pageant was held to elect the country representatives for Miss Grand International 2023. Thirty-four of which was the Miss Grand National pageants (A1). Five was other national contests that sent their main winners to Miss Grand International 2023 (A2). Six national contests listed the Miss Grand title as one of the supplement awards (B1). Meanwhile, the remaining 3 contestants later appointed its runner-up as Miss Grand National titleholder (B2), including the representatives of Gibraltar, and Denmark. and Nepal. All the remaining candidates were either determined through the casting or appointed without participating in any respective national pageants (C1 and C2), such as the representative of Hong Kong.

Four replacements and two withdrawal have been observed, including:

- Ecuador: Véronique Michielsen, the winner of Miss Grand Ecuador 2023, was replaced by the first runner-up, Andrea Ojeda Fernández, after getting pregnant during her reign.
- India: The appointed, Kashish Methwani, was replaced by a newly elected, Arshina Sumbul, due to some contract agreement between Miss Grand International PCL and the Miss Grand India license holder.
- Portugal: Anais Cerreira, who was named Miss Grand Portugal 2023 in the Miss República Portuguesa 2023 contest, was replaced by an appointed, Filipa Gama, for undisclosed reasons.
- Trinidad and Tobago: The Miss Grand Trinidad and Tobago 2023 winner, Mileidy Materano, resigned from the title, and the first runner-up, Rebekah Hislop, automatically took over the title and competed internationally as the replacement.
- Guadeloupe: Laura Ballonad, who was named Miss Grand Guadeloupe 2023 in the Miss International Guadeloupe 2023 pageant, did not compete internationally for unrevealed reasons.
- South Sudan: The appointed Amylia Deng was unable to travel to Vietnam due to visa issues, which caused her to withdraw.

In this edition, a total of eleven countries withdrew, five countries debuted, and seven countries returned, making the total 70 countries that participated. The information is summarized below.

Returns
Withdrawals
Debuts
- Last competed in 2015:
  - Greece
- Last competed in 2016:
  - Switzerland
- Last competed in 2018:
  - Taiwan
  - (United States Virgin Islands) Us Virgin Islands
- Last competed in 2019:
  - Romania
- Last competed in 2020:
  - Albania
  - Kosovo
- Last competed in 2021:
  - Egypt
- No licensee:
  - Bangladesh
  - China
  - Crimea
  - Curaçao
  - Jamaica
  - Mauritius
  - Mongolia
  - Mozambique
  - Pakistan
  - Uganda
- Representative determined
  but did not compete:
  - Guadeloupe
  - Portugal
  - South Sudan
  - Sri Lanka
- Bonaire
- Gibraltar
- Seychelles
- Trinidad and Tobago
- Uzbekistan

== National preliminary contest ==
The following is a list of Miss Grand International 2023's national preliminary contests, which were categorized by the country representative selection methods.

Map shows Miss Grand International 2023 participating countries and territories, classified by representative selection methods
Color keys
A1: Main winner of the Miss Grand National pageant, e.g., Miss Grand Spain of Spain.
A2: Main winner of the national contest with other pageant names apart from Miss Grand, e.g., Nuestra Belleza Puerto Rico of Puerto Rico.
B1: Obtained Miss Grand National as the supplementary title at other national pageants, e.g., the representative from Miss World Canada of Canada.
B2: Appointed Miss Grand National after (1) obtaining any other supplementary positions at other national pageants in 2023 or (2) finishing other placements other than the main winner at the previous Miss Grand National edition.
C1: Determined through the casting or audition processes.
C2: Appointed with no pageant held
D0: Did not participate/ to be determined

List of the national preliminary pageants (A1 – B2) for the Miss Grand International 2023 contest, by the coronation date
Country/Territory	Pageant	Type	Date and Venue	Entrants	Ref.
Total: 48 pageants		–			–
Honduras	Miss Grand Honduras	A1	July 10, 2022 at La Galería, Tegucigalpa	18	
Venezuela	Miss Grand Venezuela	A1	August 13, 2022 at Teatro Municipal of Caracas, Capital District	22	
Canada	Miss World Canada	B1	November 13, 2022 at Richmond Hill Centre for the Performing Arts, Richmond Hill	50	
Gibraltar	Miss Gibraltar	B2	November 23, 2022, at the Alameda Open Air Theatre, Gibraltar	12	
Bonaire	Miss Bonaire	A2	December 5, 2022, at the Marriott Bonaire Courtyard, Kralendijk	3	
Spain	Miss Grand Spain	A1	March 25, 2023, at Centro Comercial Martiánez Shopping Mall, Puerto de la Cruz, Santa Cruz de Tenerife	34	
Paraguay	Miss Grand Paraguay	A1	April 2, 2023, at the Paseo Events Center, Asunción	24	
Puerto Rico	Nuestra Belleza Puerto Rico	A2	April 13, 2023, at Hotel The Condado Plaza Hilton, San Juan	16	
Ecuador	Miss Grand Ecuador	A1	April 15, 2023, at TC Television Studios, Guayaquil	7	
Thailand	Miss Grand Thailand	A1	April 29, 2023, at Show DC Hall, Bangkok	77	
Czech Republic	Miss Czech Republic^{[α]}	B1	May 13, 2022, at Forum Karlín, Prague	11	
Nicaragua	Miss Grand Nicaragua	A1	May 24, 2023, at Holiday Inn Managua Convention Center, Managua	12	
South Korea	Miss Grand Korea	A1	June 4, 2023 at Grand Walkerhill Seoul Hotel, Seoul	18	
Netherlands	Miss Grand Netherlands	A1	June 4, 2023, at the Claus Park Collection, Hoofddorp	11	
Indonesia	Miss Mega Bintang Indonesia	A2	June 8, 2023, at Ciputra Artpreneur, Jakarta	20	
Brazil	Miss Grand Brazil	A1	June 10, 2023, at Recanto Cataratas Thermas Resort, Foz do Iguaçu, Paraná	28	
Italy	Miss Grand Italy	A1	June 11, 2023, at the Grand Hotel Pianeta Maratea, Maratea, Potenza	46	
Colombia	Miss Grand Colombia	A1	June 18, 2023, at the Mayor Auditorium CUN, Bogotá	23	
Chile	Miss Grand Chile	A1	June 18, 2023, at the Teatro ICTUS, Santiago	6	
Peru	Miss Grand Peru	A1	June 22, 2023, the América Televisión Studio, Lima	12	
Belgium	Miss Grand Belgium	A1	June 25, 2023, at AED Studios, Lint	9	
Bolivia	Miss Bolivia	B1	July 1, 2023, at the Salón Sirionó de la FexpoCruz, Santa Cruz de la Sierra	27	
Philippines	Miss Grand Philippines	A1	July 13, 2023, at SM Mall of Asia Arena, Bay City, Pasay, Metro Manila	30	
Australia	Miss Grand Australia	A1	July 15, 2023, at RACV City Club, Melbourne	30	
Japan	Miss Grand Japan	A1	July 16, 2023, at the Tokyo FM Hall Center, Chiyoda, Tokyo	14	
South Africa	Miss Grand South Africa	A1	July 22, 2023, at the Atterbury Theatre, Pretoria	25	
Laos	Miss Grand Laos	A1	July 29, 2023, at the National Convention Center (NCC), Vientiane	18	
El Salvador	CNB Grand El Salvador	A1	July 29, 2023, at the FEPADE Theater, San Salvador	14	
Dominican Republic	Miss Grand Dominican Republic	A1	August 5, 2023, at the Cibao Grand Theatre, Santiago de los Caballeros	18	
France	Miss Grand France	A1	August 13, 2023, at the La Salicorne Restaurant, Saujon, Charente-Maritime	8	
United Kingdom	Miss Grand United Kingdom	A1	August 13, 2023, at the Aures London, London	5	
Malaysia	Miss Grand Malaysia	A1	August 14, 2023, in the Zodiac Theatre, 7th floor Genting Dream Cruise	11	
United States	Miss Grand United States	A1	August 17, 2023, at the Crowne Plaza Chicago O'Hare Hotel & Conference Center, Chicago, Illinois	25	
Cambodia	Miss Grand Cambodia	A1	August 19, 2023, in the Koh Pich Theatre, Phnom Penh	25	
Cuba	Miss Grand Cuba	A1	August 20, 2023, at the Tampa Marriott Westshore, Tampa, Florida, United States	5	
Vietnam	Miss Grand Vietnam	A1	August 26, 2023, at the Phú Thọ Indoor Stadium, Ho Chi Minh City	44	
Denmark	Miss Denmark	B2	August 27, 2023, the Cirkusbygningen, Copenhagen	30	
Guadeloupe	Miss International Guadeloupe	B1	August 29, 2023, at the An Kann' La Restaurant, Les Abymes	12	
Mexico	Miss Grand Mexico	A1	August 30, 2023, at the Modular Inés Arredondo (MIA), Culiacán, Sinaloa	5	
Angola	Miss Grand Angola	A1	September 2, 2023, at the Epic Sana Hotel, Luanda	10	
Egypt	Miss Egypt	B1	September 2, 2023, at the Triumph Luxury Hotel, Cairo	33	
Germany	Miss From Germany	A2	September 9, 2023, in theatre of the Hotel Dolce, Bad Nauheim	8	
Nepal	Miss Universe Nepal	B2	September 9, 2023, at the Godavari Sunrise Convention Center, Lalitpur	37	
Singapore	Miss Grand Singapore	A1	September 9, 2023, at the Black Studio, Stamford Arts Centre	17	
Trinidad and Tobago	Miss & Mister Grand Trinidad and Tobago	A1	September 10, 2023, at the Banquet and Conference Centre MovieTowne Mall, Port of Spain	15	
Portugal	Miss República Portuguesa	B1	September 16, 2023, at the Cine-Teatro Messias, Mealhada	12	
India	Miss Grand India	A1	September 19, 2023, at the Rambagh Palace Hotel, Jaipur, Rajasthan	18	
Ukraine	Queen of Ukraine	A2	Private virtual pageant	N/A	
Note: 1. ^α : Miss Grand Czech Republic 2023 was organized as a sub-contest of the Miss Czech Republic 2023 pageant with the same batch of candidates, and the Miss Grand Czech Republic 2023 titleholder was excluded from the main pageant's gala final.
