= Caparo (disambiguation) =

Caparo is a British engineering company.

Caparo may also refer to:

== Business ==
- Caparo Vehicle Technologies, a specialist British car maker
- Caparo T1, a road-legal racing car
- Caparo Industries plc v Dickman, a 1990 English court case

== Geographical ==
- Caparo River (Trinidad and Tobago)
- Caparo River, a river in Venezuela
- Santa María de Caparo, the shire town of Padre Noguera Municipality, Venezuela
