= Libertville =

- Town
- Interactive map of Libertville
- Coordinates: 10°19′13.08″N 61°13′14.16″W
- Country: Trinidad and Tobago
- Region: Mayaro–Rio Claro

Population (2011)
  - Total: 2,997

Libertville is a town in the Mayaro–Rio Claro region of Trinidad and Tobago.

== Geography ==
The locality covers part of the island of Trinidad and is bordered to the north by San Pedro, to the south by Poole and Río Claro, to the east by Río Claro and to the west by San Pedro (with the section located in the Couva–Tabaquite–Talparo region) and Poole.

== Demography ==
Demographic data for the town of Libertville:

demographic vertical bar chart of Libertville between 2000 and 2011

== Education ==
- TML Libertville Primary School

== Politics ==
Libertville is part of the Mayaro constituency for elections to the Parliament of Trinidad and Tobago.

== See also ==
- List of cities and towns in Trinidad and Tobago
