= River Pool =

River Pool may refer to:

- River Pool, Cumbria
- River Pool (London)

== See also ==
- Poole River, a tributary of the Ortoire River in Trinidad.
