= Miss Grand Trinidad and Tobago =

Beauty pageant in Trinidad and Tobago

- Formation: 2023
- Type: Beauty pageant
- Headquarters: Port of Spain
- Location: Trinidad and Tobago
- Members: Miss Grand International
- Official language: English
- National director: Kehra Ramsubhag; Sean Paul
- Parent organization: Miss Trinidad and Tobago (2015, 2017); Stolen Productions Ltd. (2023 – Present)
- Website: StolenProductionsLtd.com

Miss Grand Trinidad and Tobago is a national female beauty pageant in Trinidad and Tobago to select its representative to the international Miss Grand International pageant. The pageant was founded in 2023 by a Port of Spain-based event organizer, Stolen Productions Ltd. (SPL Pageants), and is directed by Kehra Ramsubhag and Sean Paul, who also served as the national licensees of Mister Grand International in Trinidad and Tobago since 2021.

Initially, Trinidad and Tobago was projected to debut at the Miss Grand International pageant in 2015 and 2017, but the assigned representatives withdrew for undisclosed reasons.

== History ==
Since the establishment of Miss Grand International in 2013, Trinidad and Tobago had never sent its representatives to compete until a newly established event organizer named Stolen Productions Ltd. (SPL Pageants) purchased the license in 2023 and planned to organize the first contest of Miss Grand Trinidad and Tobago in that year's September to select the country representative for the 2023 international competition in Vietnam.

The first edition of Miss Grand Trinidad and Tobago was held in parallel with the male pageant, Mister Grand Trinidad and Tobago, from which the winner went to Mister Grand International 2023, held in the Philippines. Each category will consist of fifteen candidates who qualified for the national final round through an audition held earlier on July 23 at Studio 28, located in the capital city, Port of Spain.

Before acquiring the Miss Grand Trinidad and Tobago franchise, the SPL Pageants, which was established in 2021, organized Mister Trinidad and Tobago as a stand-alone pageant, and their representatives were placed as the first and third runners-up in the 2021 and 2022 international tournaments, respectively.

== Editions ==
=== Location and date ===
The following table details the Miss Grand Trinidad and Tobago pageant, held annually since 2023.

Edition	Date	Final venue	Entrants	Ref.
1st (Note: Held in parallel with the Mister Grand Trinidad and Tobago pageant.)	10 September 2023	Banquet and Conference Centre, MovieTowne Mall, Port of Spain	11	
2nd	14 July 2024	Dennis P. Ramdhan Complex, Couva	9	
3rd	12 July 2025	Le Rêve Conference Centre, Mount Pleasant, San Fernando	16	

=== Competition result ===
Edition	Winner	Runners-up		Ref.
Edition	Winner	First	Second	Ref.
1st	Mileidy Materano (Diego Martin West) (Note: Resigned)	Rebekah Hislop (St. Joseph) (Note: Assumed the title after the original winner resigned or was dethroned.)	Maria Enika Ramnath (Caroni Central)	
2nd	Kristina James (El Dorado)	Latisha Mohammed (Caparo)	Tameiah Cumming (Toco)	
3rd	Tamara Persad. (Note: Dethroned) (Rio Claro)	Tineka Francois (Vessigny)	Monique Joseph (Tobago)	

== International competition ==
The following is a list of Trinidad and Tobago representatives at the Miss Grand International contest.

Color keys

- : Declared as the winner
- : Ended as a runner-up (Top 5)
- : Ended as a finalist (Top 10)
- : Ended as a semifinalist (Top 20/21)
- : Ended as special awards winner

Year	Representative	National Title	Placement	Special Awards	National Director
Did not compete in 2026
2025	Monique Joseph	2nd runner-up Miss Grand Trinidad and Tobago 2025	Unplaced		Kehra Ramsubhag; Sean Paul
2025	Tamara Persad	Miss Grand Trinidad and Tobago 2025	Dethroned		Kehra Ramsubhag; Sean Paul
2024	Kristina James	Miss Grand Trinidad and Tobago 2024	Unplaced	Grand Voice Award	Kehra Ramsubhag; Sean Paul
2023	Rebekah Hislop (Note: Appointed the winner after the original winner resigned.)	1st runner-up Miss Grand Trinidad and Tobago 2023	Unplaced		Kehra Ramsubhag; Sean Paul
2023	Mileidy Materano (Note: Resigned)	Miss Grand Trinidad and Tobago 2023	Resigned		Kehra Ramsubhag; Sean Paul
Did not compete between 2018-2022
2017	Melissa Aguilleira	1st runner-up Miss Trinidad and Tobago 2017	Did not compete		Vanessa Manoo; Gregory Lewin
Did not compete in 2016					Vanessa Manoo; Gregory Lewin
2015	Rachelle Marcial	Miss Trinidad and Tobago 2014 Finalist	Resigned		Vanessa Manoo; Gregory Lewin
2015	Loraine Laloon	Appointed	Did not compete		Vanessa Manoo; Gregory Lewin

== National pageant candidates ==
Represented	1st	2nd	3rd
Arima	Y	Y	
Arouca	Y		
Caparo			
Carapichaima			Y
Carenage			Y
Caroni Central			
Caroni East	Y		
Chaguanas	7	Y	
D’Abadie/O'Meara		Y	
Diego Martin		Y	
Diego Martin East	Y		
Diego Martin West			
Edinburgh 500			Y
El Dorado			
Enterprise			Y
Gasparillo			Y
La horquetta		Y	
Longdenville			Y
Marabella			Y
Mayaro	Y		
Pointe-à-Pierre	7		
Point Fortin			Y
Port of Spain		Y	Y
Port of Spain North	Y		
Rio Claro			Y
San Fernando	Y		Y
San Juan	Y		Y
Santa Cruz		Y	
St. Anns East	7		
St. Augustine	7		Y
St. Joseph			
Tobago			Y
Toco			
Vessigny			Y
Wallerfield			Y
Total	11	9	16
Color keys: : Declared as the winner; : Ended as a 1st runner-up; : Ended as a 2nd runner-up; : Ended as a 3rd runner-up; : Ended as a 4th runner-up; : Ended as a 5th runner-up; A : Ended as a finalist, semifinalist and unplaced; × : Ended as withdrew during the competition; × : Ended as no representative

== Gallery ==
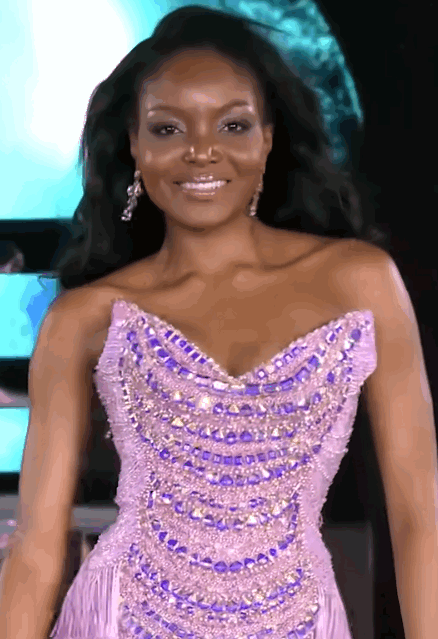
Monique Joseph
Miss Grand T&T 2025
(Assumed)

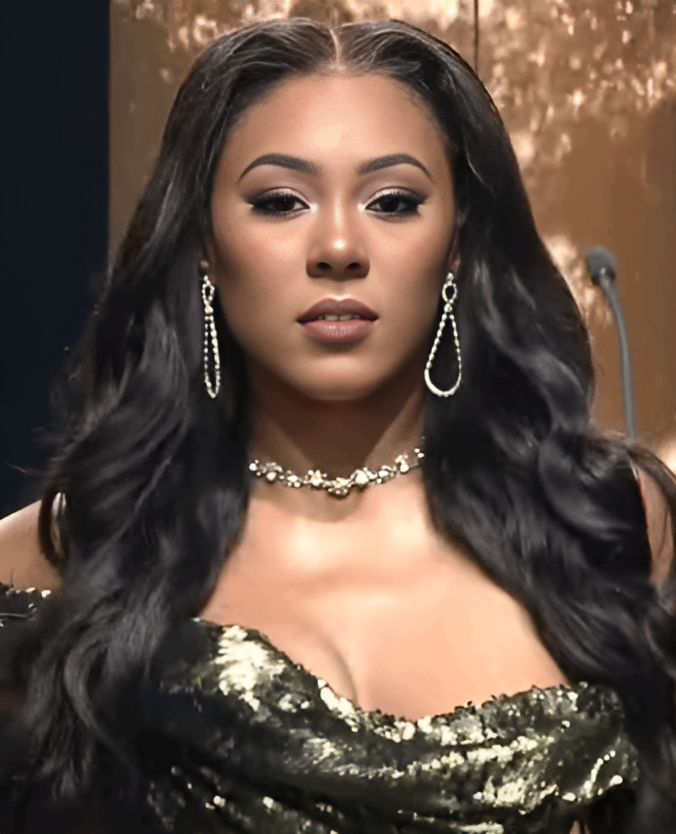
Kristina James
Miss Grand T&T 2024

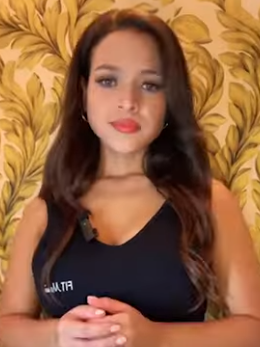
Mileidy Materano
Miss Grand T&T 2023
(Resigned)
