= Ortoire =

Ortoire may refer to:

- Ortoire (archaeological site), the archaeological type site for the Ortoiroid people
- Ortoire Block, an oil and gas exploration area
- Ortoire (village), a village in Mayaro County on Trinidad Island
- Ortoire Municipal Corporation, a political subdivision of Mayaro–Rio Claro Regional Corporation
- Ortoire River, a river on Trinidad and Tobago
- Ortoire syncline, a geologic feature in Ortoire Block, an oil and gas exploration area in the Mayaro–Rio Claro region of Trinidad
- Ortoire (ward), a section of Victoria County, Trinidad and Tobago

== See also ==
- Ortoiroid people
