= 2024 United National Congress internal election =

- 15 June 2024
- Turnout: 17,000+
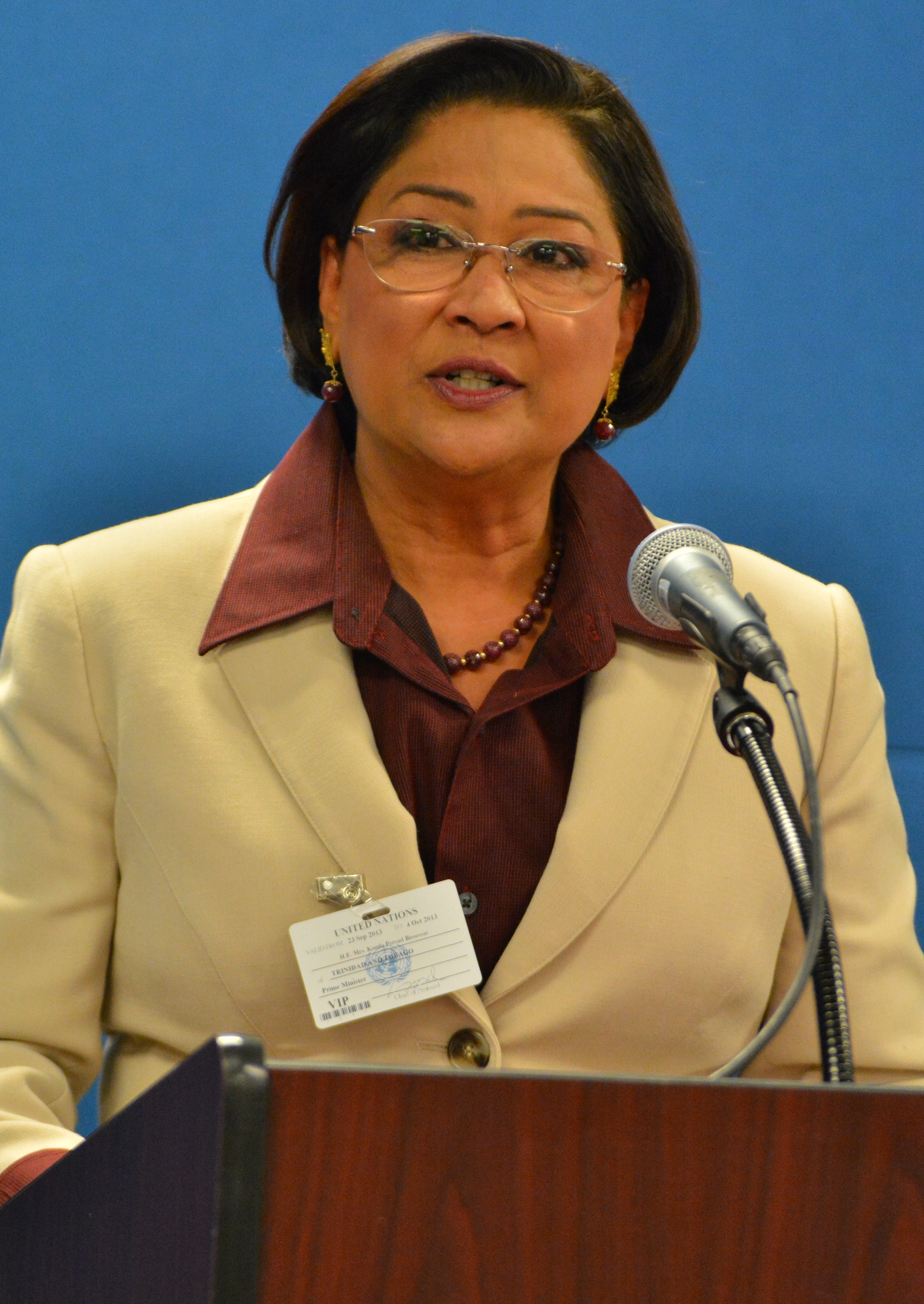

Leader	Kamla Persad-Bissessar	Rushton Paray
Popular vote	about 13,000; 76.47%	about 4,000; 17.64%
Last election	11,554 votes; 94.7%	N/A; Did not contest
Home Constituency	Siparia	Mayaro
Team	Star	United Patriots
Symbol
Team before election
Star
Elected Team
Star

The United National Congress's internal elections took place on 15 June 2024. Members of the National Executive (NATEX) of the party were elected, with the exception of the office of political leader. The candidates were split between two teams: Star led by Kamla Persad-Bissessar, the party's current political leader, Opposition Leader of Trinidad and Tobago, and MP for Siparia, and United Patriots led by Rushton Paray, the MP for Mayaro. The Star team claimed an overwhelming victory is what was called the worst internal election in the party's history.
