= Cedar Hill Village =

- Village
- Cedar Hill Village (Trinidad and Tobago)
- Country: Trinidad and Tobago
- Region: Princes Town
- Time zone: UTC−4 (AST)
- Postal Code: 85xxxx
- Official language: English

Cedar Hill Village is a rural community in Trinidad and Tobago which covers an area of approximately four square kilometres. It is about two kilometres from Princes Town. It can be found along the Manahambre Road.

== Climate ==
The city has a Tropical Wet and dry climate characterised by high Year round temperature and the last six months of the year being the wettest. The rainiest months are from June to November. In the rainy season flooding is quite common in Downtown and other city districts surrounding Cedar Hill Village.

Climate data for Cedar Hill Village
Month	Jan	Feb	Mar	Apr	May	Jun	Jul	Aug	Sep	Oct	Nov	Dec	Year
Mean daily maximum °F (°C)	80 (27)	86 (30)	87 (31)	88 (31)	88 (31)	86 (30)	87 (31)	88 (31)	88 (31)	87 (31)	87 (31)	85 (29)	87 (31)
Mean daily minimum °F (°C)	64 (18)	66 (19)	68 (20)	69 (21)	70 (21)	75 (24)	73 (23)	75 (24)	74 (23)	70 (21)	68 (20)	65 (18)	64 (18)
Average rainfall inches (mm)	2.80 (71.1)	1.70 (43.2)	1.20 (30.5)	1.80 (45.7)	4.40 (111.8)	10.00 (254.0)	9.80 (248.9)	9.40 (238.8)	7.20 (182.9)	7.00 (177.8)	7.80 (198.1)	5.80 (147.3)	68.9 (1,750.1)
Average precipitation days (≥ 0.1 mm)	12	9	4	6	10	19	21	17	17	16	17	15	253
Source 1: The Weather Channel (records)
Source 2: World Weather Online

== Sources ==
- Trinidad and Tobago Gazette
