= Nariva County =

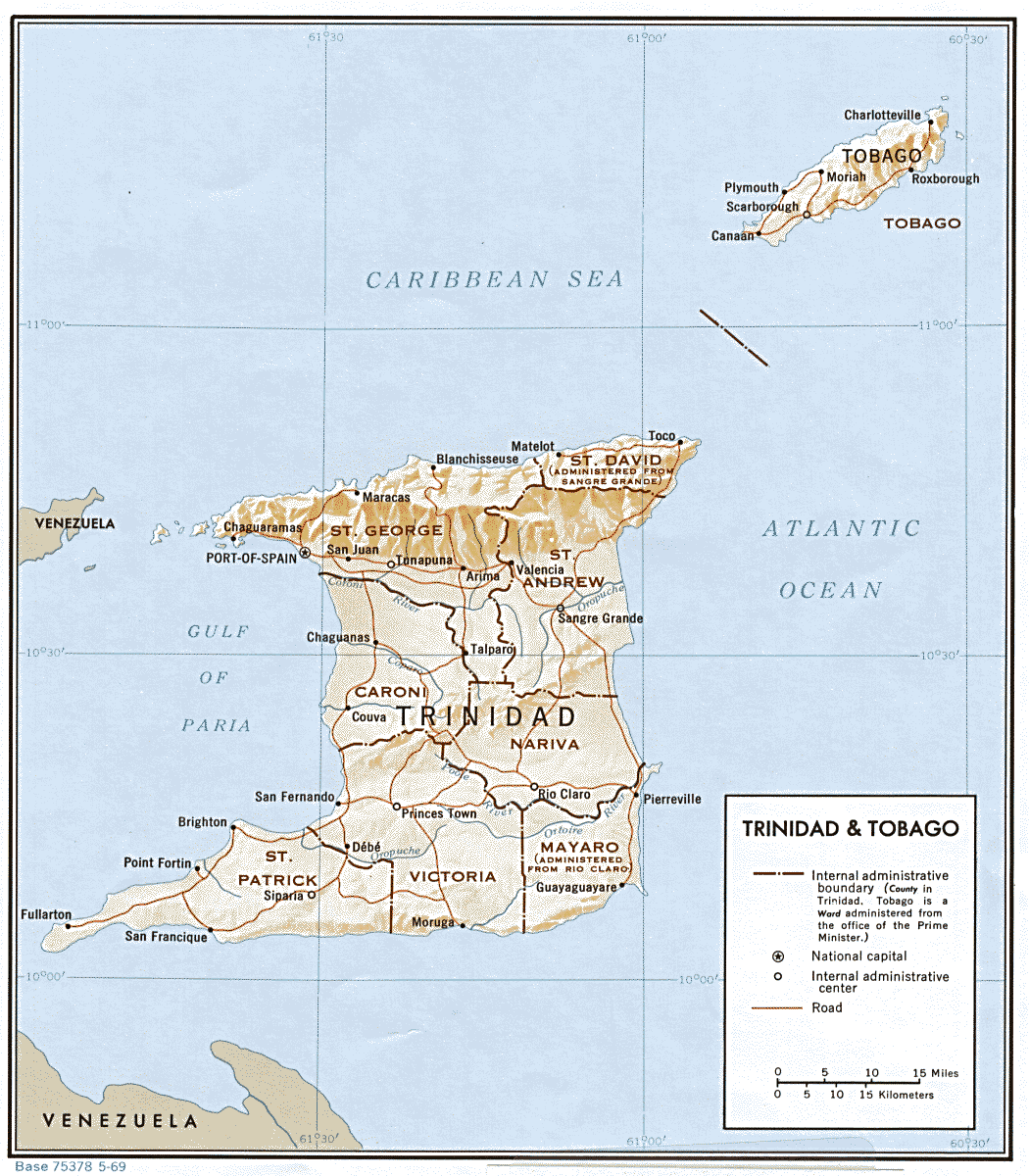
Map showing old counties of Trinidad

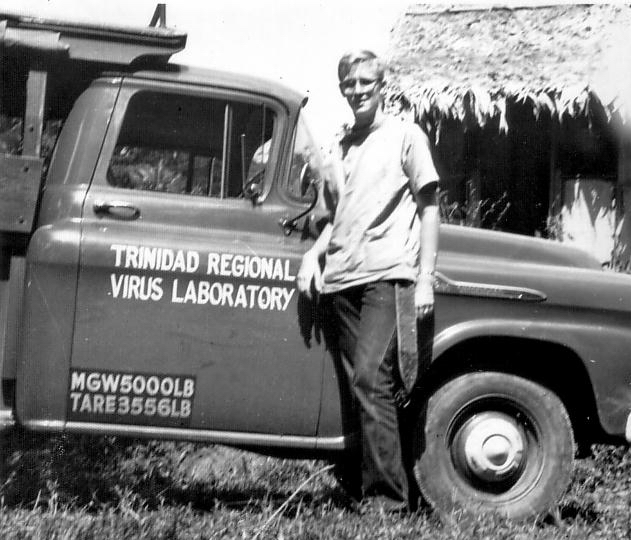
Trinidad Regional Virus Laboratory Field Assistant, Nariva Swamp, Trinidad. 1959

Nariva is a county in Trinidad and Tobago. It is located in eastern Trinidad, south of Saint Andrew County and north of Mayaro County, to the west by Victoria County and to the northwest by Saint George County. The southern boundary of the county lies along the Ortoire River and the western boundary is Cocos Bay (more commonly referred to as Manzanilla Bay). The towns of Rio Claro and Ecclesville are located in Nariva County. The Nariva Swamp is located in the eastern part of Nariva County.

Nariva County covers 166 km^{2} (64 mi^{2}) and is divided into two wards, Charuma and Cocal. The name Nariva is of Amerindian origins.

Until 1990 Nariva was administered together with the county of Mayaro by the Nariva–Mayaro County Council. Since then the county has been split between the Sangre Grande Regional Corporation and the Rio Claro–Mayaro Regional Corporation.
