= List of placenames of Indigenous origin in the Americas =

Many places throughout North, Central, and South America take their names from the languages of the indigenous inhabitants of the area. The following list, organized by country, includes settlements, geographic features, and political subdivisions whose names are derived from indigenous languages.

== Argentina ==
- See list of Mapudungun placenames for the respective placenames in Argentina
- Catamarca
- Chubut Province
- Curuzú Cuatiá
- Machagai
- Paraná
- Puerto Iguazú
- Quilmes
- Tucumán Province
- Ushuaia

== Bolivia ==
- Cochabamba
- Copacabana
- Guayaramerín
- Oruro
- Samaipata
- Uyuni
- Yacuíba

== Brazil ==
=== Alagoas State ===
- Arapiraca
- Maceió

=== Ceará State ===
- Iguatu
- Maracanaú
- Maranguape
- Pacatuba

=== Minas Gerais State ===
- Araxá
- Paracatu

=== Pará State ===
- Abaetetuba
- Igarapé-Açu
- Igarapé-Miri
- Itaituba

=== Paraná State ===
- Apucarana
- Curitiba
- Guarapuava
- Paranaguá
- Umuarama

=== Pernambuco State ===
- Caruaru

=== Rio de Janeiro State ===
- Araruama
- Campos dos Goytacazes
- Guanabara Bay
- Niterói
- Nova Iguaçu
- Paraty
- Piraí

=== Santa Catarina State ===
- Itajai

=== São Paulo State ===
- Araçariguama
- Araçatuba
- Araraquara
- Araras
- Caraguatatuba
- Jaguariúna
- Piracicaba
- Ubatuba

== Canada ==
Canada itself is a name derived from a Laurentian Iroquois word meaning "village" (cf. Mohawk kaná:ta’). See Canada's name for more details. Aboriginal names are widespread in Canada - for a full listing see List of place names in Canada of aboriginal origin. Those listed here are only well-known, important or otherwise notable places.

=== Province and territory names ===
- Ontario
- Quebec - from Míkmaq kepék, "strait, narrows"
- Manitoba
- Saskatchewan
- Nunavut
- Yukon

=== British Columbia ===
NB Too many settlements, lakes, rivers, mountains and other items in British Columbia have indigenous names for all of them to be included here. Only major or relatively notable items are listed.

==== Regions ====
- Chilcotin
- Cariboo
- Okanagan
- Kootenay
- Lillooet Country
- Nicola Country
- Stikine Country
- Nechako Country
- Cowichan Valley
- Shuswap Country
- Omineca Country
- Atlin Country
- Slocan Valley
- Haida Gwaii

==== Cities and towns ====
- Nanaimo
- Chilliwack
- Coquitlam
- Squamish
- Qualicum Beach
- Saanich
- Sooke
- Ucluelet
- Kitimat
- Keremeos
- Spuzzum
- Bella Coola
- Bella Bella
- Kamloops
- Sicamous
- Osoyoos
- Skookumchuck
- Lillooet
- Penticton
- Kelowna and West Kelowna
- Spallumcheen
- Malakwa
- Slocan City

==== Rivers and lakes ====
- Chilcotin River
  - Chilko Lake, Chilko River, Taseko River
- Omineca River
- Kechika River
- Lillooet River
- Okanagan Lake & Okanagan River
- Similkameen River
- Skeena River
- Nass River
- Homathko River
- Nechako River
- Squamish River
- Klinaklini River
- Stikine River
- Alsek River
- Tatshenshini River
- Tagish Lake
- Atlin Lake
- Taku River
- Cheakamus River
- Elaho River
- Nimpkish River
- Somass River

==== Mountain ranges ====
- Shulaps Range
- Cayoosh Range
- Lillooet Ranges
- Chilcotin Ranges
- Stikine Ranges
- Cassiar Mountains
- Cariboo Mountains
- Kitimat Ranges
- Omineca Mountains
- Muskwa Ranges

=== Alberta ===
- Kananaskis
- Athabasca
- Wetaskiwin - from the Cree word wītaskīwin-ispatinaw (ᐑᑕᐢᑮᐏᐣ ᐃᐢᐸᑎᓇᐤ), meaning "the hills where peace was made".

=== Saskatchewan ===
- Saskatoon - from Cree misāskwatōmin, "saskatoon berry."

Manitou Lake Little Manitou Lake Manitou | North American Indian religion

=== Manitoba ===
- Winnipeg—a transcription of a western Cree word meaning "muddy waters"
- Manitoba -- "where the spirit (manitou) speaks"

=== Ontario ===
  - Adjala-Tosorontio:Tosorontio is derived from the Huron (Wyandot) word meaning "beautiful mountain", and Adjala was the name of the wife of Chief Tecumseh.
  - Algonquin Provincial Park: Named after the Algonquin (Anishinaabeg) people of Ontario.
  - Almaguin Highlands: Derived from the words Algonquin and Magnetawan.
  - Assiginack
  - Algoma District
  - Atikokan: Ojibwe for "caribou bones."
  - Attawapiskat: "People of the parting of the rocks" from the Swampy Cree (Omushkegowuk) chat-a-wa-pis-shkag.
  - Brantford: Named after Joseph Brant, a Mohawk leader.
  - Cataraqui River
  - Cayuga: Named for the Cayuga people of Ontario.
  - Chinguacousy
  - Couchiching: Derived from the Ojibwe gojijiing, meaning "inlet."
  - Deseronto: Named for Captain John Deseronto, a native Mohawk leader who was a captain in the British Military Forces during the American Revolutionary War.
  - Eramosa: Thought to be derived from the word un-ne-mo-sah (possibly meaning "black dog", "dead dog", or simply "dog").
  - Esquesing Township: Mississauga Anishinaabe word ishkwessin, meaning "that which lies at the end", which was the original name for Bronte Creek.
  - Etobicoke: "The place where the alders grow" from the word wadoopikaang in the Ojibwe language.
  - Fort Erie: Iroquoian, erige, meaning "cat".
  - Gananoque: Origin unknown, thought to be derived from Native languages for "place of health" or "meeting place" or "water running over rocks."
  - Garafraxa: Possibly derived from the word for "panther country".
  - Iroquois Falls: Named for the Iroquois people of Ontario.
  - Kakabeka Falls: From the Ojibwe word gakaabikaa, "waterfall over a cliff".
  - Kaministiquia River: Derived from gaa-ministigweyaa, an Ojibwe word meaning "(river) with islands".
  - Kanata: Mohawk word meaning "village" or "settlement."
  - Kapuskasing: Of Cree origin, possibly meaning "bend in river."
  - Kawartha Lakes: An Anglicization of the word ka-wa-tha (from ka-wa-tae-gum-maug or gaa-waategamaag), a word coined in 1895 by Martha Whetung of the Curve Lake First Nation, meaning "land of reflections" in the Anishinaabe language. The word was subsequently changed by tourism promoters to Kawartha, with the meaning "bright waters and happy lands."
  - Keewatin: Algonquian for "north wind." Derived from either kīwēhtin in Cree or giiwedin in Ojibwe.
  - Madawaska: Named after an Algonquian band of the region known as Matouweskarini, meaning "people of the shallows".
  - Magnetawan: Derived from the word for "swiftly flowing river."
  - Manitoulin Island: Manitoulin is the English version, via French, of the Old Odawa name Manidoowaaling, which means "cave of the spirit".
  - Manitouwadge: From manidoowaazh in Ojibwe, meaning "cave of the spirit."
  - Manitowaning
  - Manotick: Derived from Algonquin for "island."
  - Matachewan
  - Matawatchan
  - Mattawa: "Meeting of the waters" in Ojibwe.
  - M'Chigeeng
  - Michipicoten: "Big bluffs" in Ojibwe.
  - Missinaibi Provincial Park: Cree for "pictured waters," thought to refer to the pictographs found on rock faces along the river.
  - Mississauga: Named for the native tribe of the Mississaugas
  - Mississippi Mills: May originate from Mazinaa[bikinigan]-ziibi, Algonquian for "[painted] image river", referring to the pictographs found on Mazinaw Lake.
  - Moosonee: Derived from the Cree word moosoneek, meaning "at the Moose (River)".
  - Muskoka: Named for a First Nations chief of the 1850s, Chief Yellowhead or Mesqua Ukie.
  - Napanee
  - Nassagaweya: Derived from the Mississauga word nazhesahgewayyong, meaning "river with two outlets."
  - Neebing
  - Niagara: Iroquois in origin, meaning uncertain.
  - Nipigon: May have originated from the Ojibwe word animbiigoong, meaning "at continuous water" or "at waters that extend [over the horizon]."
  - Nipissing: From the Anishinaabe term nibiishing, meaning "at (some) water".
  - Nottawasaga River: Derived from the Algonquin words for "Iroquois" and "river outlet".
  - Ohsweken
  - Oneida Nation of the Thames
  - Onondaga
  - Ontario
  - Opasatika, "river lined with poplars".
  - Oshawa: from the Ojibwe term aazhaway, meaning "crossing to the other side of a river or lake" or just "(a)cross".
  - Otonabee: From the Ojibwe term "Odoonabii-ziibi" (Tullibee River). Otonabee comes from the words ode which means "heart" and odemgat that comes from "boiling water". It translates into "the river that beats like a heart in reference to the bubbling and boiling water of the rapids along the river"
  - Ottawa: "To buy" from the word adaawe in the Anishinaabe language; adapted as the name of the Odawa people.
  - Penetanguishene: believed to come from either the Wyandot language or from the Abenaki language via the Ojibwa language, meaning "land of the white rolling sands".
  - Petawawa: From Algonquin meaning "where one hears the noise of the water"
  - Powassan: From the word for "bend."
  - Pukaskwa National Park
  - Saugeen: Ojibwa language, Zaagiing, meaning outlet
  - Shawanaga
  - Scugog: Derived from the Mississauga word sigaog, which means "waves leap over a canoe."
  - Shuniah: named after the Ojibwa word "zhooniyaa" for "money" or "silver"
  - Sioux Narrows
  - Sioux Lookout
  - Tecumseh
  - Tehkummah
  - Temagami: from the Anishinaabe word dimiigami, "deep water(s)".
  - Timiskaming: from the Algonquin language Temikami or Temikaming, meaning "deep waters".
  - Toronto: from an Iroquoian language, but of uncertain derivation. Another story says it is derived from the Mohawk word "tkaronto" meaning "trees standing in the water".
  - Tuscarora
  - Tyendinaga: Derived from a variant spelling of Mohawk leader Joseph Brant's traditional Mohawk name, Thayendanegea.
  - Wahnapitae: from the Anishinaabe waanabide, "be shaped like a hollow tooth".
  - Wasaga Beach: Derived from "Nottawasaga," as above.
  - Wawa
  - Wawanosh
  - Wikwemikong: from the Anishinaabe wiikwemikong, "Bay of Beavers" from Nishnaabe word "Amik" meaning beaver.
  - Wyoming: derived from the Munsee name xwé:wamənk, meaning "at the big river flat."

=== Quebec ===
==== Regions ====
- Abitibi
- Kativik
- Manicouagan
- Nunavik
- Outaouais
- Saguenay
- Temiscamingue
- Ungava

==== Towns and villages ====
- Cascapédia
- Chibougamau
- Chicoutimi
- Chisasibi
- Hochelaga
- Inukjuak
- Ivujivik
- Kahnawake
- Kanesatake
- Kenogami
- Kuujjuaq
- Matagami
- Matapedia
- Métabetchouan
- Mistissini
- Nemaska
- Paspebiac
- Puvirnituq
- Salluit
- Shawinigan
- Shigawake
- Stadacona
- Tadoussac
- Wemindji

=== Nunavut ===
- Pangnirtung
- Iqaluit

=== Northwest Territories ===
- Aklavik
- Tuktoyaktuk
- Inuvik
- Somba K'e - alternate official name, in the Dogrib language, of Yellowknife

=== Yukon ===
- Yukon River
- Klondike

== Caribbean ==
=== Bahamas ===
- Bimini
- Mayaguana

=== Cuba ===
- Baracoa
- Guanabacoa
- Guantánamo

=== Dominican Republic ===
- Bonao
- Cibao
- Dajabón
- Higüey
- Jarabacoa
- Jaragua National Park
- Jimaní
- Mao
- Yuna River

=== Grenada ===
- Carriacou

=== Haiti ===
- Gonaïves -from Gonaibo
- Gonâve Island -from Guanabo
- Grand-Goâve -from Aguava
- Jacmel
- Léogâne -from Yaguana
- Petit-Goâve -from Aguava

=== Puerto Rico ===
- Bayamón
- Caguas
- Humacao
- Jayuya
- Maunabo

=== Saint Christopher and Nevis ===
- Mount Liamuiga

=== Saint Vincent and the Grenadines ===
- Bequia
- Canouan

=== Trinidad ===
- Arima
- Aripo
- Arouca
- Carapo
- Caroni
- Chacachacare
- Cachipa
- Caura
- Chaguanas
- Chaguaramas
- Couva
- Cunupia
- Curucaye
- Guaico
- Guanapo
- Guaracara
- Guayaguayare
- Icacos
- Iere
- Macoya
- Mayaro
- Naparima
- Nariva
- Oropuche
- Ortoire (disambiguation)
- Paria
- Salybia
- Siparia
- Tamana
- Tumpuna
- Tunapuna
- Yarra

== Chile ==
- List of Mapudungun placenames

Non-Mapudungun Placenames:

- Arica
- Calama
- Copiapó
- Coquimbo
- Coyhaique
- Iquique
- Pali-Aike National Park
- Torres del Paine National Park

== Colombia ==
- Arauca Department
- Bogotá - from former main Muisca settlement Bacatá
- Cali - from Calima
- Cúcuta
- Duitama - from Tundama
- Ibagué - from Pijao cacique Ibagué
- Maicao
- Nemocón
- Sogamoso - from Suamox
- Tunja - from former Muisca settlement Hunza
- Zipaquirá - Muysccubun: "land of the zipa" or "city of our father"
- Cundinamarca Department - Quechua: “Condors nest”
- Boyacá Department - Muysccubun: "Near the cacique"
- Tolima Department - from Panche language
- Cesar Department - from Chimila language
- Quindío Department - from Quimbaya
- Chocó Department
- Cauca Department - from Emberá
- Valle del Cauca Department - from Emberá
- La Guajira Department - from Wayuu
- Putumayo Department - from Quechua
- Huila Department - from Paéz
- Caquetá Department
- Amazonas Department
- Guaviare Department
- Vaupés Department
- Guainía Department
- Meta Department
- Vichada Department
- Inírida - from Puinave language
- Yopal
- Mitú
- Popayán
- Quibdó
- Funza
- Machetá
- Firavitoba
- Ráquira
- Tequendama
- Sumapaz
- Ubaté
- Lake Guatavita
- Chivor
- Tipacoque
- Sugamuxi
- Boavita
- Zetaquirá
- Duitama
- Tutazá
- Firavitoba
- Tota
- Chivatá
- Gachancipá
- Tocancipá
- Guanentá
- Chipatá
- El Guacamayo
- Zapatoca
- Ayapel
- Tubará
- Guatapé - Quechua: ”Stones and water”
- Chimá
- Tuchín
- Guataquí
- Popayán - Quechua: “Pampayán”
- Pasto
- Güicán
- El Cocuy
- Siecha Lakes
- Guasca

== Ecuador ==
- Ambato
- Babahoyo
- Chimborazo
- Cotopaxi
- Guayaquil
- Otavalo
- Quito
- Tulcán
- Tungurahua

== El Salvador ==
- Cojutepeque
- Cuscatlán Department
- Sensuntepeque
- Usulután
- Zacatecoluca

== Guatemala ==
The country name comes from Nahuatl Cuauhtēmallān, "place of many trees", a translation of Kʼicheʼ K’ii’chee’, "many trees" (="forest").

Nahuatl Placenames:

- Chichicastenango
- Chimaltenango
- Chiquimula
- Escuintla
- Huehuetenango- from Nahuatl, the original Mayan name was Xinabahul
- Jalapa
- Jutiapa
- Lake Atitlán
- Mazatenango
- Quetzaltenango- from Nahuatl, the original Mayan name was Xelajú
- Zacapa

Mayan Placenames:

- Lake Petén Itzá

== Guyana ==
- Demerara
- Kaieteur Falls

== Honduras ==
- Choluteca
- Juticalpa
- Nacaome
- Siguatepeque
- Tegucigalpa

== Mexico ==
The name of Mexico is the Nahuatl name for the island in the middle of Lake Texcoco where the Aztecs had their capital, its etymology is opaque.

=== States ===
- Chiapas- Believed to derive from the ancient city of Chiapan, which means "the place where the chia sage grows" in Náhuatl.
- Chihuahua- May come from "dry place" in an unknown Indian language.
- Coahuila- possibly from the Nahuatl word Cuauhillan - "Place of trees"
- Guanajuato- Means "hill of frogs" in the Purépecha language
- Michoacán- Translates to "the place of the fishermen" from the Nahuatl word michhuahcan.
- Nayarit- derived from the endonym of the Cora people "naayarite"
- Oaxaca-Comes from the Nahuatl word huaxyácac or "place of the guaje trees".
- Querétaro- Could come from the Otomi meaning "the great ball game" or the Purépecha language meaning "place of stones".
- Tamaulipas- derives from tamaholipa a Huastec term that could mean "place where high hills".
- Tlaxcala- Means "Place of Maize tortilla". in Nahuatl
- Zacatecas- Named after the Zacatec; an indigenous nation in the area. It means "inhabitants of the grassland" in Nahuatl.

=== Chiapas ===
- Tuxtla Gutiérrez

=== Guerrero ===
- Acapulco
- Chilpancingo
- Ixtapa
- Zihuatanejo

=== Mexico City ===
- Azcapotzalco
- Chapultepec
- Coyoacán
- Cuauhtémoc
- Iztapalapa
- Xochimilco

=== Michoacán ===
- Janitzio
- Tzintzuntzan

=== Quintana Roo ===
- Cancún
- Chetumal
- Cozumel
- Sian Ka'an

=== Sinaloa ===
- Culiacán
- Los Mochis
- Mazatlán

=== Sonora ===
- Guaymas
- Navojoa

=== State of Mexico ===
- Chalco
- Ciudad Nezahualcóyotl
- Naucalpan
- Teotihuacán
- Texcoco
- Toluca

=== Veracruz ===
- Coatzacoalcos
- Minatitlán
- Xalapa

=== Yucatán ===
- Chicxulub (both the town and the impact crater)
- Izamal
- Oxkutzcab
- Tekax
- Ticul
- Tizimín

== Nicaragua ==
- Chinandega
- Jinotega
- Matagalpa
- Masaya
- Ometepe
- Tipitapa

== Panama ==
- Chitré
- Guna Yala
- Macaracas
- Natá
- Panama
- Penonomé
- Taboga Island

== Paraguay ==
- Caaguazú
- Caacupé
- Humaitá
- Itá
- Itapúa Department
- Itauguá
- Ypacaraí

== Peru ==
- Abancay
- Apurímac River
- Arequipa
- Ayacucho
- Cajamarca
- Chachapoyas
- Chancay
- Chiclayo
- Chimbote
- Chincha Alta
- Cusco
- Huancayo
- Huari
- Iquitos
- Lambayeque
- Moche
- Moyobamba
- Ollantaytambo
- Pachacamac
- Piura
- Pucallpa
- Puquio
- Tumbes
- Urubamba River
- Yurimaguas

== Suriname ==
- Paramaribo
- Saramacca River

== Uruguay ==
- Tacuarembó

== Venezuela ==
- Acarigua
- Aragua
- Baruta
- Cagua
- Carabobo
- Caracas
- Carúpano
- Cerro Sarisariñama
- Cúa
- Cumaná
- Guacara
- Guaicaipuro
- Guanare
- Laguna de Tacarigua
- Los Teques
- Maracaibo
- Naguanagua
- Orinoco
- Táchira
- Upata

== See also ==
- List of place names in Canada of aboriginal origin
- List of Chinook Jargon placenames

== Bibliography ==
- Bright, William (2004). Native American Place Names of the United States. Norman: University of Oklahoma Press.
- Campbell, Lyle (1997). American Indian Languages: The Historical Linguistics of Native America. Oxford: Oxford University Press.
- O'Brien, Frank Waabu (2010). "Understanding Indian Place Names in Southern New England". Colorado: Bauu Press.
