= Princes Town =

Princes Town Savana Grande
- Town
- Location within Trinidad and Tobago Location within the Caribbean Location within North America
- Country: Trinidad and Tobago
- Region: Princes Town
- Settled: 1687
- Named for: Prince Albert and Prince George.

Area
  - Total: 38.1 km^{2} (14.7 sq mi)

Population (2011)
  - Total: 28,335
  - Rank: 7th
  - Density: 743/km^{2} (1,920/sq mi)
- Time zone: UTC−4 (AST)
- Postal Code: 85xxxx
- Area code: 868

Princes Town (originally founded as Savana Grande) is a town within an eponymous region, located on south-Central Trinidad island in Trinidad and Tobago. The population of the town is 28,335.

== History ==
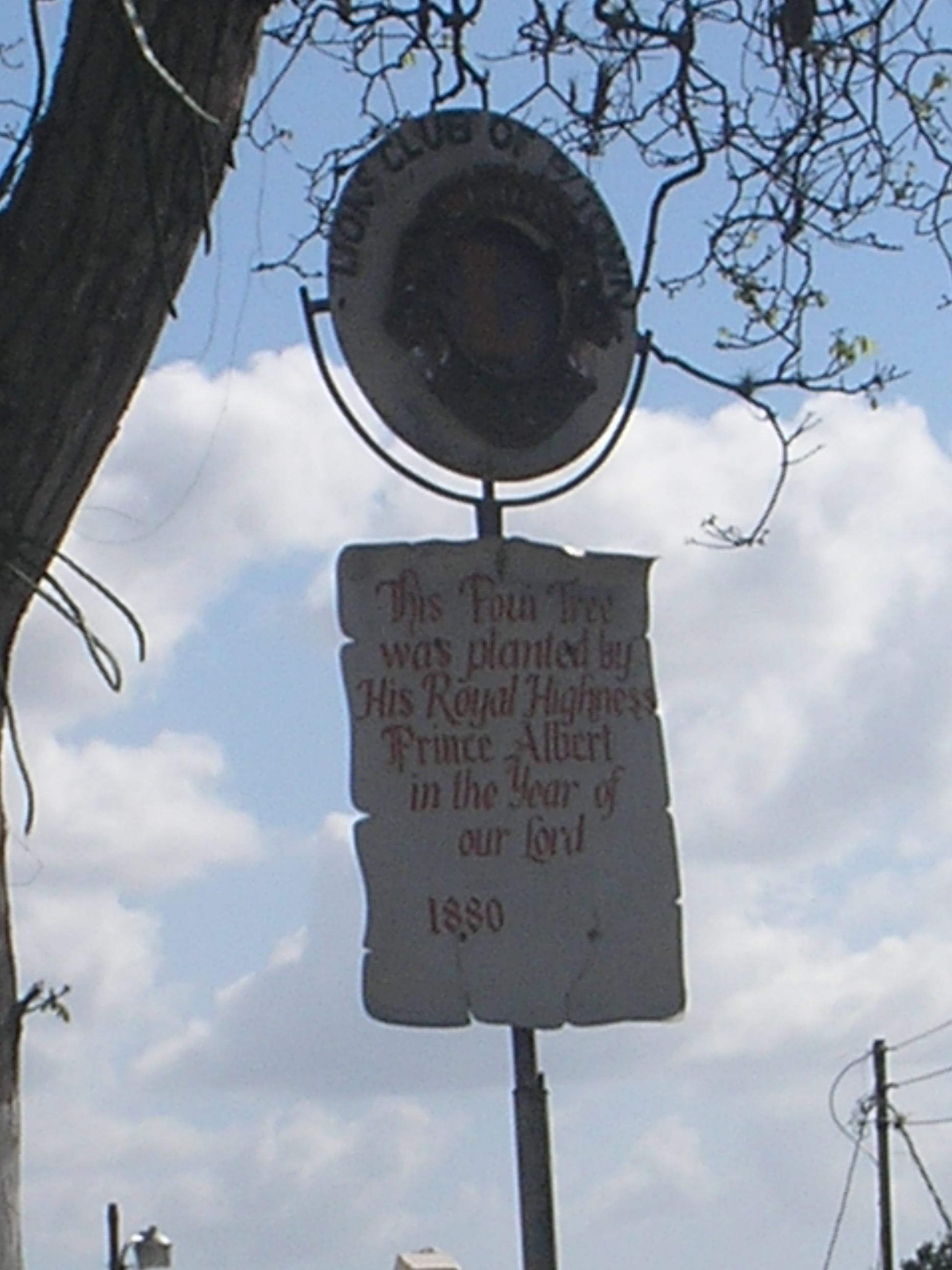
Historical marker at the Poui tree (Tabebuia sp.) Prince Albert planted in 1880.

Founded as the Amerindian Mission of Savana Grande, the town was renamed after the 1880 visit by Queen Victoria's grandsons, Prince Albert and Prince George (later King George V). The Princes each planted a Poui tree (Tabebuia sp.) at the Anglican church in the area, which still survives to this day.

The sugar industry that had helped to build the economy of Princes Town was closed in 2003, leaving hundreds of workers on the breadline. With the closure of the industry, there was a decline in activities in the town as well as the surrounding estates.

In the area of culture, the early East Indian families brought to Cedar Hill Village, a village on the outskirts of the town centre, the festival of Ramleela. Cedar Hill is generally regarded as the first village where the cultural practice began. The amphitheatre in which the festival is held ranks among the best in Trinidad for open-air theatrical performances. The lands on which the amphitheatre is located were donated to the Ramleela organisation of Cedar Hill by Usine Ste Madeleine. Every year, thousands of patrons descend on this site to take part in the celebrations.

Princes Town still remains the centre of stick-fighting, which is part of the Carnival celebrations. Every year on January 20, an observance called Princes Town Day is held in the town under the auspices of the Princes Town Regional Corporation.

== Geography ==
Princes Town is located in south Trinidad, east of San Fernando, west of Rio Claro and north of Moruga. Consequently, it serves as a major administrative centre for a substantial area of south Trinidad, and has developed a reputation as a major shopping town for the southern region. Princes Town is also known for the famous Ali family, who set up many established "doubles" institutes, a famed local delicacy.

One of the schools in the area is St. Stephen's College, which is administered jointly by the Ministry of Education and the Anglican Board. The school was started in the late 1950s and was known then as Bishop Anstey. St. Stephen's College has the distinction of having an amphitheatre style auditorium, which is fringed at the rear by the main school block in a semicircle fashion.

Major landmarks include the Yolande Pompey Recreation Ground.

=== Climate ===
Princes Town has a tropical monsoon climate and a tropical savanna climate (Köppen classification Aw and Af). Daily highs are about 33 °C while daily lows are about 28 °C, and they remain fairly constant throughout the year with very little variance. There is medium precipitation throughout the year, with a dry season from February to April. The weather is also very cloudy, with less than 1500 sunshine hours each year.

Climate data for Princes Town
Month	Jan	Feb	Mar	Apr	May	Jun	Jul	Aug	Sep	Oct	Nov	Dec	Year
Mean daily maximum °C (°F)	31 (88)	31 (88)	32 (90)	32 (90)	33 (91)	33 (91)	34 (93)	35 (95)	35 (95)	34 (93)	33 (91)	32 (90)	33 (91)
Mean daily minimum °C (°F)	26 (79)	26 (79)	27 (81)	28 (82)	28 (82)	28 (82)	28 (82)	29 (84)	29 (84)	29 (84)	28 (82)	27 (81)	28 (82)
Average precipitation mm (inches)	69 (2.7)	43 (1.7)	41 (1.6)	51 (2.0)	82 (3.2)	113 (4.4)	144 (5.7)	165 (6.5)	130 (5.1)	132 (5.2)	131 (5.2)	128 (5.0)	1,229 (48.3)
Average precipitation days	23	20	18	18	23	26	26	26	24	24	25	27	280
Mean monthly sunshine hours	93	114	124	120	124	120	155	155	150	124	90	93	1,462
Mean daily sunshine hours	3	4	4	4	4	4	5	5	5	4	3	3	4
Average ultraviolet index	6	6	6	6	6	6	6	6	7	6	6	7	6

== Politics ==
The constituency of Princes Town is one of the 41 Parliamentary seats that are contested for the General Elections in Trinidad and Tobago. The current Member of Parliament for this constituency is Mr. Barry Shiva Padarath, first elected to office in 2015. The growth of the town caused it to be one of the constituencies that were split in 2007 into Princes Town North and Princes Town South/Tableland to make 41 constituencies for the 2007 Trinidad and Tobago general election. Princes Town is also the seat of government for the Princes Town Regional Corporation (local elections), and was formerly the seat of the County of Victoria.

== Notable residents ==
- Amy Leong Pang - painter
- Adrian Cola Rienzi (Krishna Deonarine) - politician
- Basdeo Panday - former Prime Minister of Trinidad and Tobago, politician, lawyer, and actor
