= Libertyville =

Libertyville is the name of some places in the United States:

- Libertyville, Alabama
- Libertyville, Illinois
  - Libertyville station
  - Libertyville Township, Illinois
- Libertyville, Indiana
- Libertyville, Iowa
- Libertyville, Missouri

== See also ==
- Libreville
- Libertville
