= Miss Grand Trinidad and Tobago 2025 =

3rd Miss Grand Trinidad and Tobago contest

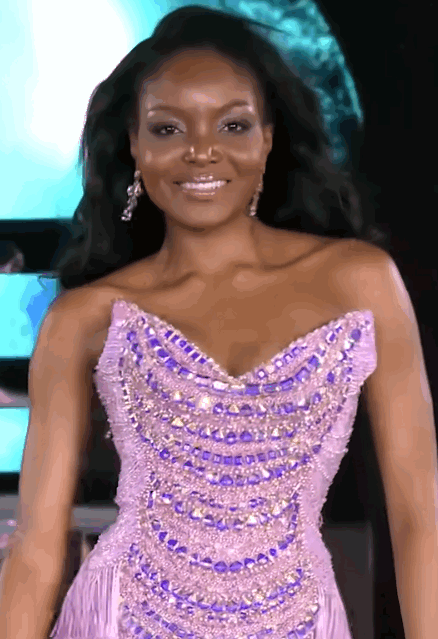
- Monique Joseph
- Date: 12 July 2025
- Venue: Le Rêve Conference Centre, C3 Centre, Corinth, San Fernando
- Producer: Stolen Productions
- Entrants: 16
- Placements: 10
- Winner: Tamara Persad (Rio Claro)
- Congeniality: Reneeice Charles (Gasparillo)
- Photogenic: Monique Joseph (Tobago)

Miss Grand Trinidad and Tobago 2025 was the third Miss Grand Trinidad and Tobago pageant organized by Stolen Productions. It was held at the Le Rêve Conference Centre, C3 Centre in Corinth, San Fernando, on 12 July 2025. Sixteen contestants from different regions and municipalities of Trinidad and Tobago competed for the title.

Tamara Persad, representing Rio Claro, was declared the winner of the competition and was crowned by her predecessor, Kristina James, Miss Grand Trinidad and Tobago 2024. Persad was originally designated to represent Trinidad and Tobago at the Miss Grand International 2025 pageant; however, she was subsequently dethroned several weeks prior to the event. The title was then assumed by the second runner-up, Monique Joseph of Tobago.

== Result ==
Position	Delegate
Winner	Rio Claro – Tamara Persad (dethroned)
1st runner-up	Vessigny – Tineka Francois
2nd runner-up	Tobago – Monique Joseph (assumed)
Top 5	San Juan – Priyanka Maharaj; Point Fortin – Nikeisha Garette
Top 10	No data available
Special awards
Miss Congeniality	Gasparillo – Reneeice Charles
Miss Social Media	San Juan – Priyanka Maharaj
Miss Photogenic	Tobago – Monique Joseph
People's Choice	Enterprise – Makayla Blair
Best Physique	Vessigny – Tineka Francois
Grand Voice	Saint Augustine – Shakira Camejo

== Contestants ==
Number of Miss Grand Trinidad and Tobago 2025 contestants by regions and municipalities
Color key:
Locality with 3 representatives
Locality with 2 representatives
Locality with 1 representative
Locality with no representative

Sixteen contestants competed for the title.

- Carapichaima – Simone Jeffery
- Carenage – Niome Nedd
- Edinburgh 500 – Tiah Pierre
- Enterprise – Makayla Blair
- Gasparillo – Reneeice Charles
- Longdenville – Danyael-Sky Roopnarinesingh
- Marabella – Davine Kanhai
- Point Fortin – Niekeisha Garette
- Port of Spain – Nikita Richardson
- Rio Claro – Tamara Persad
- Saint Augustine – Shakira Camejo
- San Fernando – Angel Gayadeen
- San Juan – Priyanka Maharaj
- Tobago – Monique Joseph
- Vessigny – Tineka Francois
- Wallerfield – Shumyiah Ramdeen
