= Eccleshill =

Eccleshill may refer to the following places in England:

- Eccleshill, Lancashire
- Eccleshill, West Yorkshire
  - Eccleshill railway station

== See also ==
- Ecclesville, Trinidad and Tobago
