= Gypsy (calypsonian) =

Trinidadian politician (born 1952)

Winston "Gypsy" Peters

Member of Parliament for Mayaro
- In office 5 November 2007 – 7 September 2015
- Preceded by: Constituency established
- Succeeded by: Rushton Paray
- Majority: 12,846

Personal details
- Born: 20 October 1952 (age 73) Mayaro, Trinidad
- Party: United National Congress

Winston Edward Peters (born 20 October 1952), also known by his sobriquet Gypsy, is a Trinidad and Tobago politician and calypsonian who served as Trinidad and Tobago's Minister of Community Development in the People's Partnership Coalition led by Prime Minister Kamla Persad-Bissessar. Peters also served as Minister of Arts and Multiculturalism from 27 May 2010 to 22 June 2012.

Peters was born in Mayaro, where he now serves as the M.P. for that constituency (Mayaro) and has been serving since 2007 and also between 1995 and 2002 for the United National Congress (UNC). He is also a former U.S. Marine.

He is famous for his calypsos "Sinking Ship" and "Little Black Boy", and is recognised for winning over seven Extempo titles.

Peters' election to Parliament in 2000 was challenged by the People's National Movement (PNM). On nomination day, the PNM raised the issue that Peters and William Chaitan (UNC candidate for the Pointe-à-Pierre seat) were ineligible to stand for election on the grounds that they held dual citizenship (Peters was a citizen of both Trinidad and Tobago and the United States, while Chaitan was a citizen of Trinidad and Tobago and Canada). The law requires that candidates in General Elections should not owe allegiance to foreign powers. This law was a relic of the 1961 Independence Constitution, which did not dual citizenship. The 1976 Republican Constitution allows dual citizenship, and under a law passed by the National Alliance for Reconstruction government in 1987 Trinidad and Tobago nationals who gave up their citizenship (for example, by becoming a naturalised citizen of a foreign country) can re-acquire their Trinidad and Tobago citizenship simply by filing an application.

Although the constitution was altered to allow dual citizenship, the election laws were not. Given this internal inconsistency, together with the fact that the term "allegiance" was not defined in the law, the Elections and Boundaries Commission declined to rule Peters and Chaitan ineligible for the elections. After they won their seats, the PNM sought to have the courts overturn the results, but this matter was not resolved during the life of the Parliament.

He was selected as the candidate for Mayaro in the 2007 general elections by the opposition UNC-A and won his seat. He was not selected as a candidate to contest elections in the 2015 general elections. In the 2020 general elections, he ran for the seat of Moruga Tableland as a member of parliament for the People's National Movement.

Former New York Dolls frontman David Johansen released a cover of "Sinking Ship".
