= Wilfred Nicholas Morris =

Trinidad and Tobago politician

Wilfred Nicholas Morris MP

Member of Parliament for Mayaro
- Incumbent
- Assumed office 28 April 2025
- Preceded by: Rushton Paray

Personal details
- Other political affiliations: UNC

Hon. Wilfred Nicholas Christiane Morris is a Trinidad and Tobago politician from the United National Congress (UNC). He was elected to represent Mayaro in the House of Representatives in the 2025 Trinidad and Tobago general election.

Morris presently serves as a Minister in the Office of the Prime Minister.

He previously served as a Parliamentary Secretary in the Ministry of Foreign and Caricom Affairs as well as the Office of the Prime Minister

== Career ==
Morris is a former Commonwealth Youth Ambassador and Commonwealth Youth Parliamentarian.

Morris was the Youth Prime Minister of Trinidad and Tobago. He served as chairman of the UNC National Youth Arm from 2011 to 2015.

After his election in the 2025 Trinidad and Tobago general election, Morris was appointed Parliamentary Secretary in the Ministry of Foreign and CARICOM Affairs and Parliamentary Secretary in the Office of the Prime Minister by Prime Minister Kamla Persad-Bissessar.

In February 2026 Morris was promoted and sworn in as Minister in the Office of the Prime Minister

== Personal life ==
His father was killed in a traffic accident in 2014.

== Electoral history ==
2025 Trinidad and Tobago general election: Mayoro
Party	Candidate	Votes	%	±%
UNC	Nicholas Morris	11,241	70.1%	▲
PNM	Beatrice Bridglal	4,381	27.3%	▼
PF	Brittney Williams	347	2.2%	Steady
Majority		6,860	42.8%	
Turnout		16,030	54.62%	
Registered electors		29,346		
UNC hold		Swing	%	
