= Ortoire (village) =

Fishing village in Trinidad and Tobago

- Village/Municipal Corporation
- Location within Trinidad and Tobago
- Coordinates: 10.3366°N 60.9955°W
- Country: Trinidad and Tobago
- Island: Trinidad
- County (historical): Mayaro
- Region Corporation: Mayaro-Rio Claro

Population (2011)
  - Total: 764

Ortoire is a village in Mayaro County on Trinidad Island. It is named after the adjacent Ortoire River. The village dates to at least the 1880s or a few decades earlier. Ortoire is just west of the peninsula of Point Radix, named after a French immigrant granted an estate there in 1783. The village's beach at the mouth of the river provides shelter to ocean-going fishing boats. The village was not listed in the 1901 census, but was believed to have "a few hundred people" then. The village is within the Ortoire Municipal Corporation, a political subdivision of the Mayaro–Rio Claro Regional Corporation, a political region of Trinidad and Tobago that replaced the historical county of Mayaro in 1991. The Ortoire Municipal Corporation includes the Point Radix peninsula and is bounded by Mafeking on the west, St. Joseph Village on the south, and the Atlantic Ocean on the east and north.

The population as of the 2011 census was 764, of which 375 were male, and 230 were under the age of 18.
