= Maraval River =

River in Trinidad and Tobago

Coordinates: 10°39′34″N 61°32′14″W

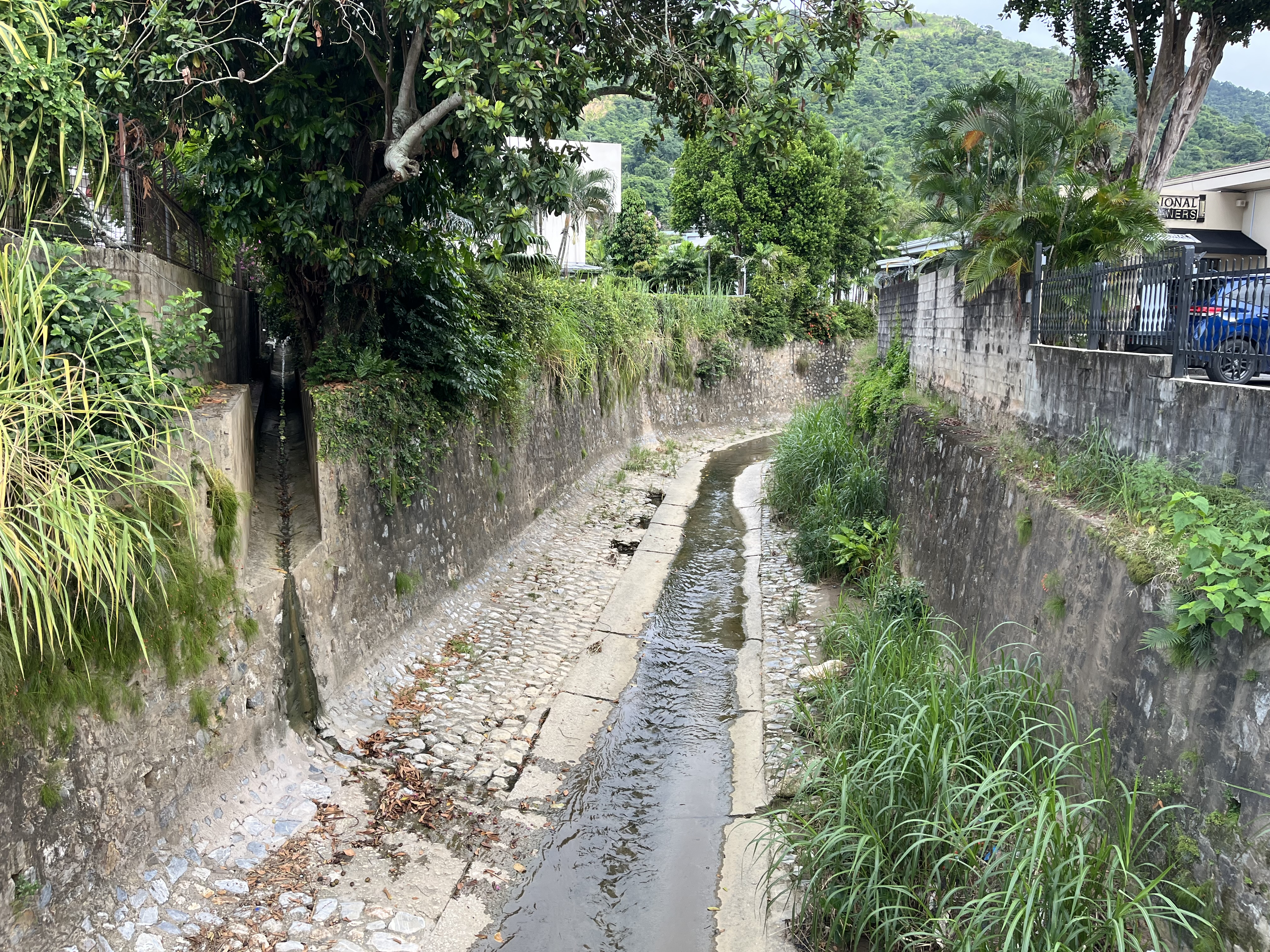
Maraval River

The Maraval River is a small river/mountain stream located on the west coast of the island of Trinidad.

It runs for a length of 4.39 kilometres (3 mi) from its origins in the Northern Range to its river mouth at Port of Spain, where it enters the Gulf of Paria.

In the late 1850s a dam and filtration plant was constructed on the upper reaches of the Maraval River, and until the 1900s it served as Port of Spain's main drinking water supply. In 1912 it was transferred to the Port-of-Spain Water Authority. It is currently the property of the Water and Sewerage Authority.

== See also ==
- List of rivers in Trinidad and Tobago
