= Mafeking, Trinidad and Tobago =

Village

Coordinates: 10.329°N 61.018°W

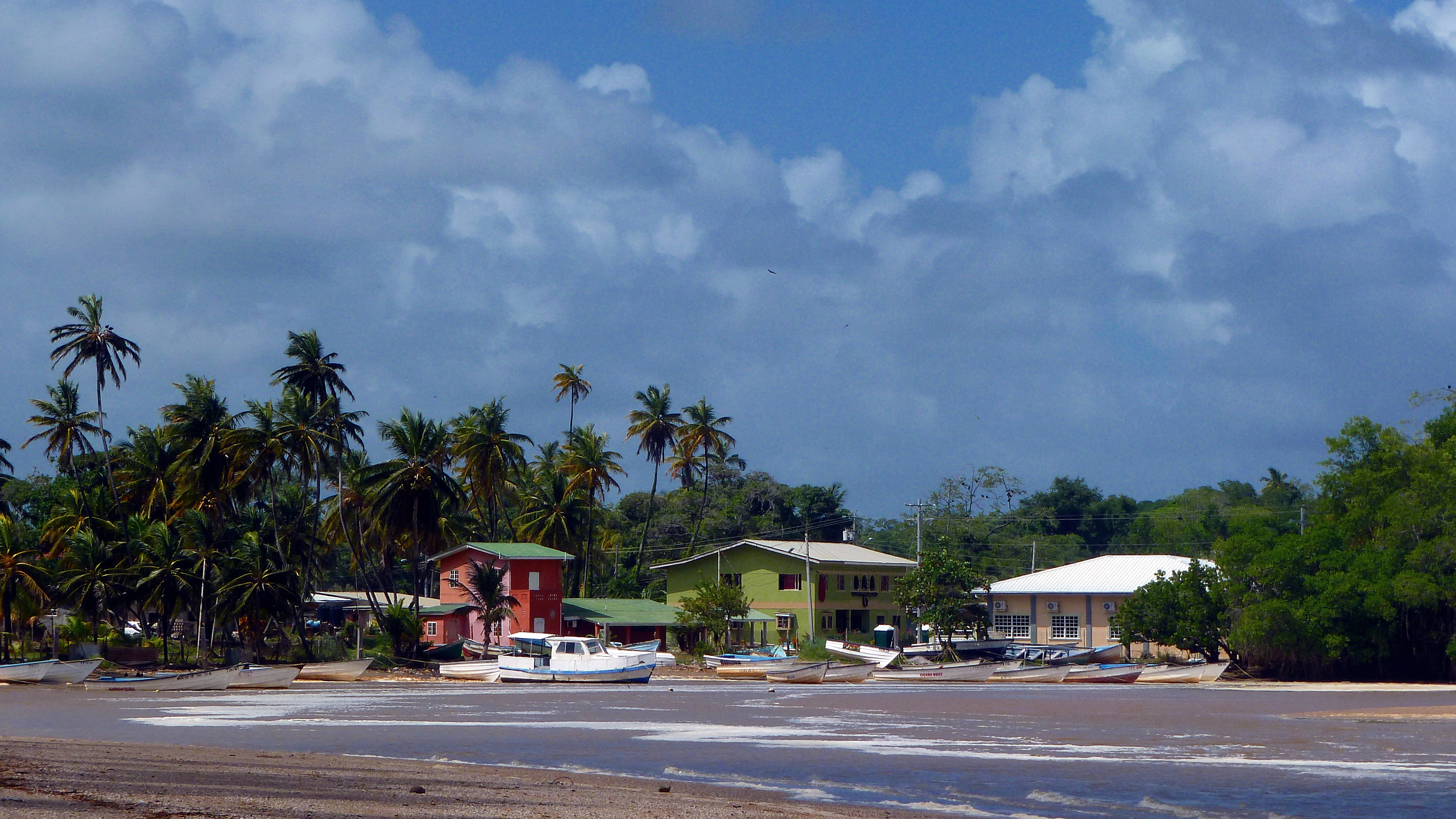
The village of Mafeking at the mouth of the Ortoire

Mafeking is a village in Mayaro County, Trinidad and Tobago, located on the Ortoire River. Mafeking has historically had problems with water drainage and stagnant water, leading to fears of dengue fever.
