= List of rivers of Trinidad and Tobago =

This is a list of rivers of Trinidad and Tobago.

== Trinidad ==
- Caroni River
- Lalland River
- Oropouche River
- Salybia River
- Mathura River
- Maracas River
- Shark River
- Caura River
- Valencia River
- Caparo River
- Marchine River
- Hondo River
- Maraval River
- Poole River
- Blue Basin River
- Diego Martin River
- San Juan River
- St. Joseph River
- Covigne River Gorge
- Marianne River
- Yarra River
- Chaguaramas River
- Moruga River
- Maturita River
- Pilote River
- Jack River
- Santa Cruz
- Tunapuna River
- Macoya/Trantrill River
- Tacarigua River
- Arouca River
- Oropuna River
- Mausica River
- Arima River
- Talparo River
- Tumpuna River
- Guanapo River
- El Mamo River
- Aripo River
- Cumuto River
- Guayamare River
- Couva River
- Guaracara River
- Tarouba River
- Cipero River
- Guapo River
- Cunupia River
- Ravine Sable River

== Tobago ==
- Courland River
- Coffee River
- Castara River
- Bloody Bay River
- Cook River (Tobago)
- Bacolet River
  - Sandy River
- Hillsborough West River
- Hillsborough East River
- Goldsborough River
- Richmond River (Great Dog River)
  - Belle River
- Roxborough River
- Queens River
- Kings Bay River
