= Ecclesville =

Town in Trinidad and Tobago

- Town
- Interactive map of Ecclesville
- Coordinates: 10°19′25.07″N 61°8′56.83″W
- Country: Trinidad and Tobago
- region: Mayaro–Rio Claro

Population (2011)
  - Total: 2,063

Ecclesville is a town located in Nariva County, Trinidad and Tobago.

== See also ==
- List of cities and towns in Trinidad and Tobago
