= Miss Grand Trinidad and Tobago 2023 =

1st edition of Miss Grand Trinidad and Tobago competition

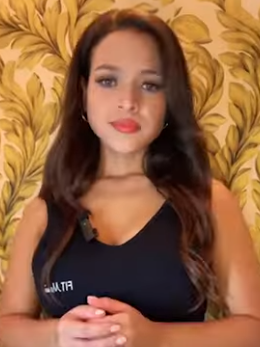
- Mileidy Materano, the winner of the contest
- Date: 10 September 2023
- Venue: Banquet and Conference Centre MovieTowne Mall, Port of Spain
- Entrants: 11
- Placements: 7
- Debuts: Arima; Caroni Central; Chaguanas; Diego Martin West; Mayaro; Pointe-à-Pierre; Port of Spain North; San Fernando; St. Anns East; St. Augustine; St. Joseph
- Winner: Mileidy Materano (Diego Martin West)

Miss Grand Trinidad and Tobago 2023 competition result by administrative division
Color key:
Winner	Top 7
1st runner-up	Unplaced
2nd runner-up	Withdrew
No representative

Miss Grand Trinidad and Tobago 2023 was the inaugural edition of the Miss Grand Trinidad and Tobago pageant. The grand final of the contest, which was originally set for 2 September, was organized on 10 September 2023, at the Banquet and Conference Centre MovieTowne Mall, Port of Spain.

Fifteen candidates, who qualified for the national round through an audition, will compete for the title, of whom, a 29-year-old Venezuelan actress representing Diego Martin West, Mileidy Materano, was elected the winner, while the representatives of St. Joseph and Caroni Central, Rebekah Hislop and Maria Enika Ramnath, were named the runners-up. Materano was expected to represent the country at the Miss Grand International 2023 pageant in Vietnam on 25 October 2023.

The election of Materano caused debate since she is not a Trinidad and Tobago-born national, having immigrated from Venezuela in 2017 due to the Crisis in Venezuela. Legal action was also pursued for some intimidation. Due to the controversy Mileidy resigned a week before the international contest schedule, and the first runner-up, Rebekah Hislop, automatically took over the title.

== Background ==
After two consecutive years of sending Trinidad and Tobago representatives to compete at the male competition, Mister Grand International, the pageant organizer of Stolen Productions Ltd. (SPL Pageants) additionally purchased the female license of Miss Grand International for Trinidad and Tobago in 2023 and planned to organize the first competition of Miss Grand National pageant to elect the winner to compete in the 2023 international tournament in Vietnam. The pageant was held parallelly with the male category, Mister Grand Trinidad and Tobago, which was first organized in 2022.

Before reaching the national grand final, the organizer held an audition to select the finalists on 23 July at Studio 28 located in the country capital, Port of Spain, in which the top 15 finalists for each category were elected. All candidates were later revealed in the Grand Reveal Ceremony held on 6 August at the Luna Restaurant West Mall, Port of Spain.

The grand final round of the pageant was originally set for 2 September 2023, at the Southern Academy for the Performing Arts (SAPA), San Fernando, but was later rescheduled to 10 September and the venue was moved to the Banquet and Conference Centre in MovieTowne Mall, Port of Spain.

== Result ==
Position	Delegate
Miss Grand Trinidad and Tobago 2023	Diego Martin West – Mileidy Materano (Resigned)
1st runner-up	St. Joseph – Rebekah Hislop (Assumed)
2nd runner-up	Caroni Central – Maria Enika Ramnath
Top 7	Chaguanas – Britney Ramatula; Pointe-à-Pierre – Vinaya Leandra; St. Anns East – Andrea Sofia; St. Augustine – Jessika Emrit
Special award
Miss Congeniality	Arima – Hashanna Hosein

== Contestants ==
External videos
- Miss Grand Trinidad and Tobago 2023: Grand final coronation, on September 10, 2023, YouTube video

Initially, fifteen contestants confirmed their participation, but four of them withdrew.

- Arima – Hashanna Hosein
- Arouca – Varishma Matroo (withdrew)
- Caroni Central – Maria Enika Ramnath
- Caroni East – Samantha Neeranjan (withdrew)
- Chaguanas – Britney Ramatula
- Diego Martin East – Vanita Dalipram (withdrew)
- Diego Martin West – Mileidy Materano
- Mayaro – Shinisee Mohammed
- Pointe-à-Pierre – Vinaya Leandra
- Port of Spain – Shalyma Boisselle
- San Fernando – Diamond John Williams
- San Juan – Celine Hosten (withdrew)
- St. Anns East – Andrea Sofia
- St. Augustine – Jessika Emrit
- St. Joseph – Rebekah Hislop
