= Rushton Paray =

Trinidad and Tobago politician

The Honourable Rushton Paray MP

Member of Parliament for Mayaro
- In office 2015–2025
- Preceded by: Winston Peters
- Succeeded by: Nicholas Morris

Personal details
- Other political affiliations: UNC

Rushton Paray is a Trinidad and Tobago politician. He represented Mayaro in the House of Representatives from 2015 to 2025.

He was a candidate in the 2024 United National Congress internal election. He was defeated by Kamla Persad-Bissessar in a landslide.

He was not selected to contest the 2025 Trinidad and Tobago general election.
