= Poole River =

Physical characteristics
- Depth
  - average: 29 m (95 ft)

The Poole River is a river in Trinidad and Tobago. It is located in the Mayaro–Rio Claro region, in the southeastern part of the country, 70 km southeast of Port-of-Spain, the capital. The Poole River is located on the island of Trinidad. In 2025, the river flooded causing damage to local homes.

== See also ==
- List of rivers of Trinidad and Tobago
