= Caparo River (Trinidad and Tobago) =

- The estuary of the Caparo River

Physical characteristics
- Mouth
  - location: Gulf of Paria
  - coordinates: 10.5251°N 61.4666°W
  - elevation: 0m

The Caparo River is a river which drains into the Gulf of Paria on the west coast of Trinidad. It flows through the town of Chaguanas.

== See also ==
- List of rivers in Trinidad and Tobago
- Caparo River, Venezuela
