= Miss Grand Ecuador 2023 =

2nd Miss Grand Ecuador competition, beauty pageant edition

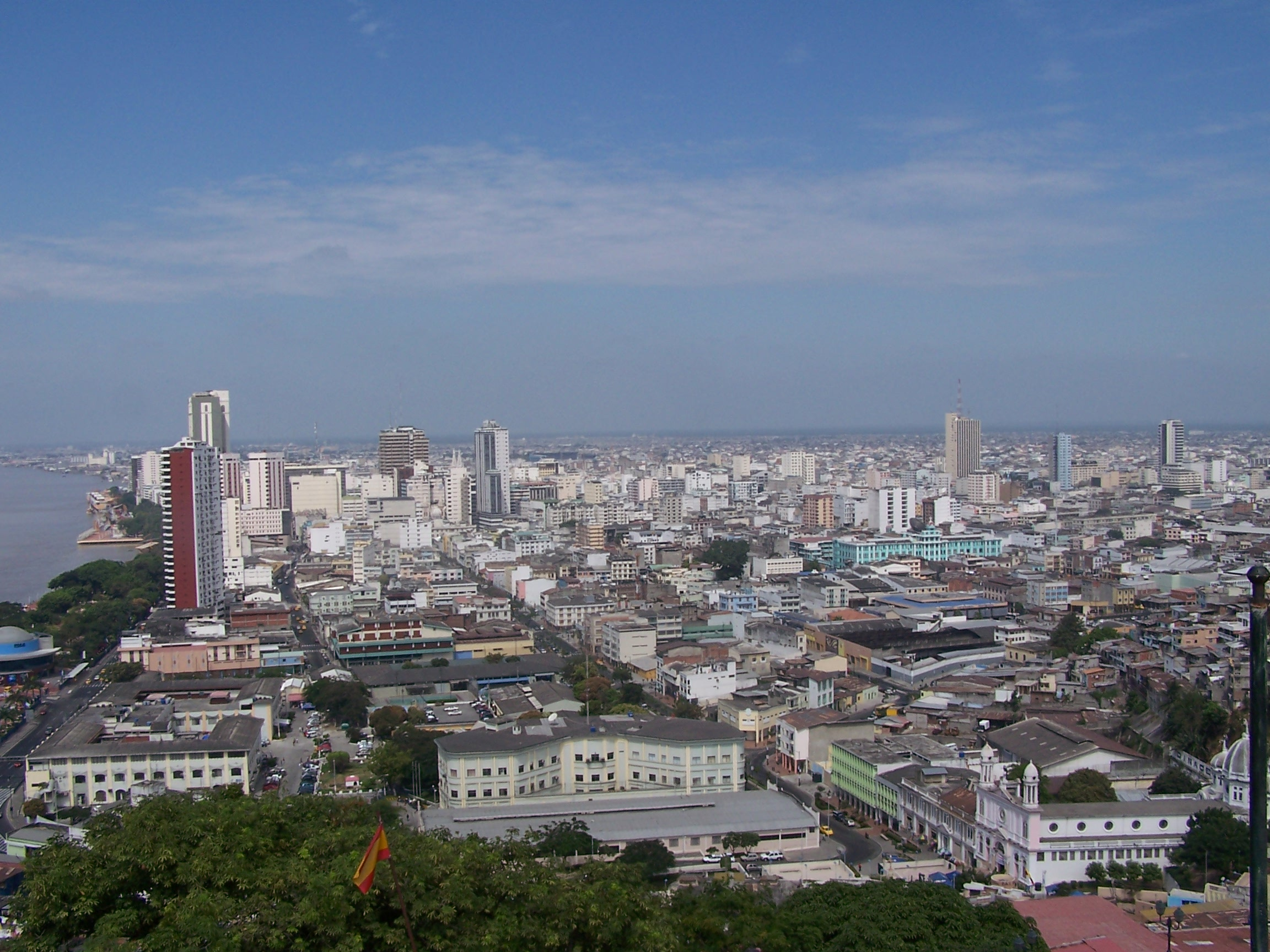
- Guayaquil, the host city of the contest
- Date: 15 April 2023
- Presenters: Eduardo Andrade
- Venue: TC Televisión Studios, Guayaquil
- Broadcaster: YouTube
- Entrants: 7
- Placements: 3
- Debuts: Europe; United States; Guayaquil; Santo Domingo de los Tsáchilas
- Withdrawals: Cañar; Los Ríos; Pichincha
- Winner: Véronique Michielsen (Ecuadorian communities in Europe; Dethroned); Andrea Ojeda (Guayaquil, Assumed)
- Best in Swimsuit: Véronique Michielsen (Ecuadorian communities in Europe)
- Best Social Project: Tamara Bautista (Esmeraldas)

External videos
- Miss Grand Ecuador 2023 Grand Final Competition, on April 15, 2023, YouTube video

Miss Grand Ecuador 2023 was the second edition of the Miss Grand Ecuador beauty pageant, held at TC Televisión Studios, Guayaquil. It was originally proposed to be held in January but was postponed to April 15, 2023, for unspecified reasons. Candidates from seven provinces of the country, who qualified for the national pageant via an audition performed virtually earlier in November 2022, competed for the title.

The event was held by a Guayaquil-based pageant organizer headed by Tahiz and Miguel Panus, Concurso Nacional de Belleza Ecuador (CNB Ecuador). The grand final round of the pageant was hosted by an Ecuadorian television presenter, radio host, and singer, Eduardo Andrade, and was live-transmitted to the audience worldwide via its international parent contest's YouTube channel, GrandTV, and was also attended by Miss Grand International 2017 from Peru, María José Lora.

The winner of the contest, Véronique Michielsen, representing Ecuadorian communities in Europe, was crowned by Miss Grand Ecuador 2022, Lisseth Naranjo. However, Michielsen was later dethroned a few months before entering the international contest, thus, the first runner-up Andrea Ojeda assumed the title and competed at the Miss Grand International 2023 pageant as the replacement.

== Result ==
Position		Delegate
Miss Grand Ecuador 2023		(European Union) Europe Communities – Véronique Michielsen (Dethroned)
1st runner-up		Guayaquil – Andrea Ojeda (Assumed)
2nd runner-up		Santo Domingo de los Tsáchilas – Alyson Flores
Special awards
Best in Swimsuit		(European Union) Europe Communities – Véronique Michielsen
Best in Sportswear		Guayaquil – Andrea Ojeda
Best Social Project		Esmeraldas – Tamara Bautista
Miss Runway		El Oro – Noemí Cedeño
Miss Multimedia		Santo Domingo de los Tsáchilas – Alyson Flores
Grand Challenge	(gold) Gold	(European Union) Europe Communities – Véronique Michielsen
Grand Challenge	(silver) Silver	Manabí – Nayeli Párraga
Grand Challenge	(bronze) Bronze	(United States) USA Communities – Doménica Valverde

== Candidates ==
Seven candidates competed for the title.

Province	Delegate	Age	Height	Hometown
(European Union) Ecuadorian communities in Europe	Véronique Michielsen Marcillo	22	1.80 m (5 ft 11 in)	Antwerp
(United States) Ecuadorian communities in USA	Doménica Valverde Zamora	22	1.75 m (5 ft 9 in)	Washington D.C
El Oro	Noemí Cedeño Carrasco	22	1.78 m (5 ft 10 in)	Machala
Esmeraldas	Tamara Bautista Mansaba	24	1.70 m (5 ft 7 in)	Esmeraldas
Guayaquil	Andrea Ojeda Fernández	24	1.75 m (5 ft 9 in)	Guayaquil
Manabí	Nayeli Párraga Zambrano	21	1.72 m (5 ft 7 1/2 in)	Portoviejo
Santo Domingo de los Tsáchilas	Alyson Flores Lozano	23	1.75 m (5 ft 9 in)	Santo Domingo
