= Asif Jan =

Trinidadian cricketer (born 1979)

Personal information
- Full name: Asif Iqbal Jan
- Born: 11 February 1979 (age 47); Trinidad
- Source: Cricinfo, 28 November 2020

Asif Jan (born 11 February 1979) is a Trinidadian cricketer. He played in fifteen first-class matches for Trinidad and Tobago from 1999 to 2003.

== See also ==
- List of Trinidadian representative cricketers
