= Padre Noguera Municipality =

Padre Noguera Municipality Municipio Padre Noguera
- Municipality
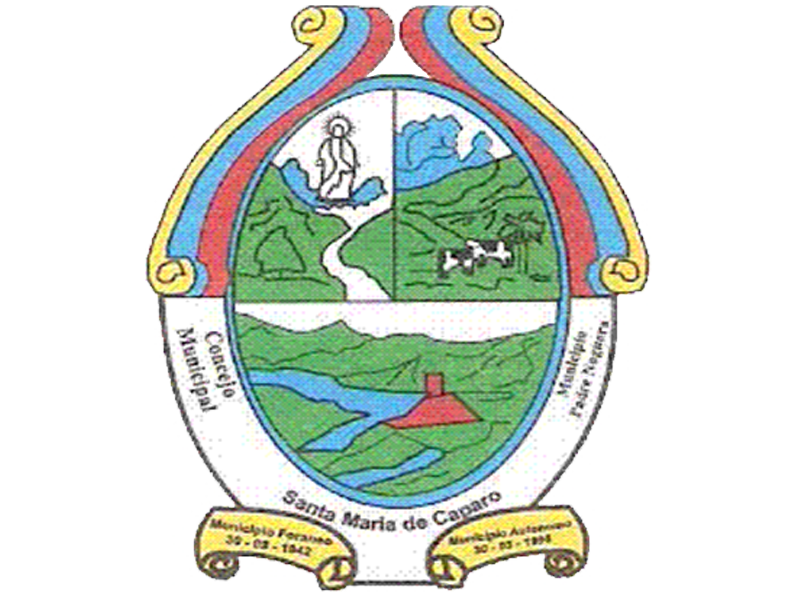
- Flag Coat of arms

- Location in Mérida

- Location in Venezuela
- Coordinates: 7°48′08″N 71°26′44″W
- Country: Venezuela
- State: Mérida

Government
  - Mayor: Omar Contreras (PSUV)

Area
  - Total: 206 km^{2} (80 sq mi)

Population (2007)
  - Total: 3,028
  - Density: 14.7/km^{2} (38.1/sq mi)
- Time zone: UTC−4 (VET)
- Area code(s): 0277
- Website: Official website

The Padre Noguera Municipality is one of the 23 municipalities (municipios) that makes up the Venezuelan state of Mérida and, according to a 2007 population estimate by the National Institute of Statistics of Venezuela, the municipality has a population of 3,028. The town of Santa María de Caparo is the shire town of the Padre Noguera Municipality.

== History ==
On March 25, 1963, the Padre Noguera Municipality was founded within the Liberty District, and on December 3, 1964, its name changed to Liberty District Archbishop Chacon, now Arzobispo Chacón Municipality. In 1975, studies began to build a dam, and in 1980 the construction work flooded the area, forcing the evacuation of 20 of the 23 villages that existed in the town, leaving only the villages Florida, Vegón, and the larger Tucupido Santa Maria of Caparo. The impact of hydroelectric development Camburito-Caparo was such that the extension of the county shrank from 319 km^{2} to 206 km^{2} due to flooding to keep the waters of the reservoir. On March 19, 1986, the municipality changed its name to Autonomous Municipality Padre Noguera.

== Geography ==
The territory is divided into three areas due to the water of the Caparo Dam. Part of the town is protected by the Tapo-Caparo National Park

== Demographics ==
The Padre Noguera Municipality, according to a 2007 population estimate by the National Institute of Statistics of Venezuela, has a population of 3,028 (up from 2,565 in 2000). This amounts to 0.36% of the state's population. The municipality's population density is 14.7 inhabitants per square kilometre (38/sq mi).

== Government ==
The mayor of the Padre Noguera Municipality is Alidio Josè Pérez Bustamante, elected on October 31, 2004, with 28% of the vote. He replaced Albidio Torres shortly after the elections. The municipality is divided into one parish (Capital Padre Noguera).

== See also ==
- Santa María de Caparo
- Mérida
- Municipalities of Venezuela
