= Mayaro County =

County on Trinidad island

Coordinates: 10°12′N 61°00′W

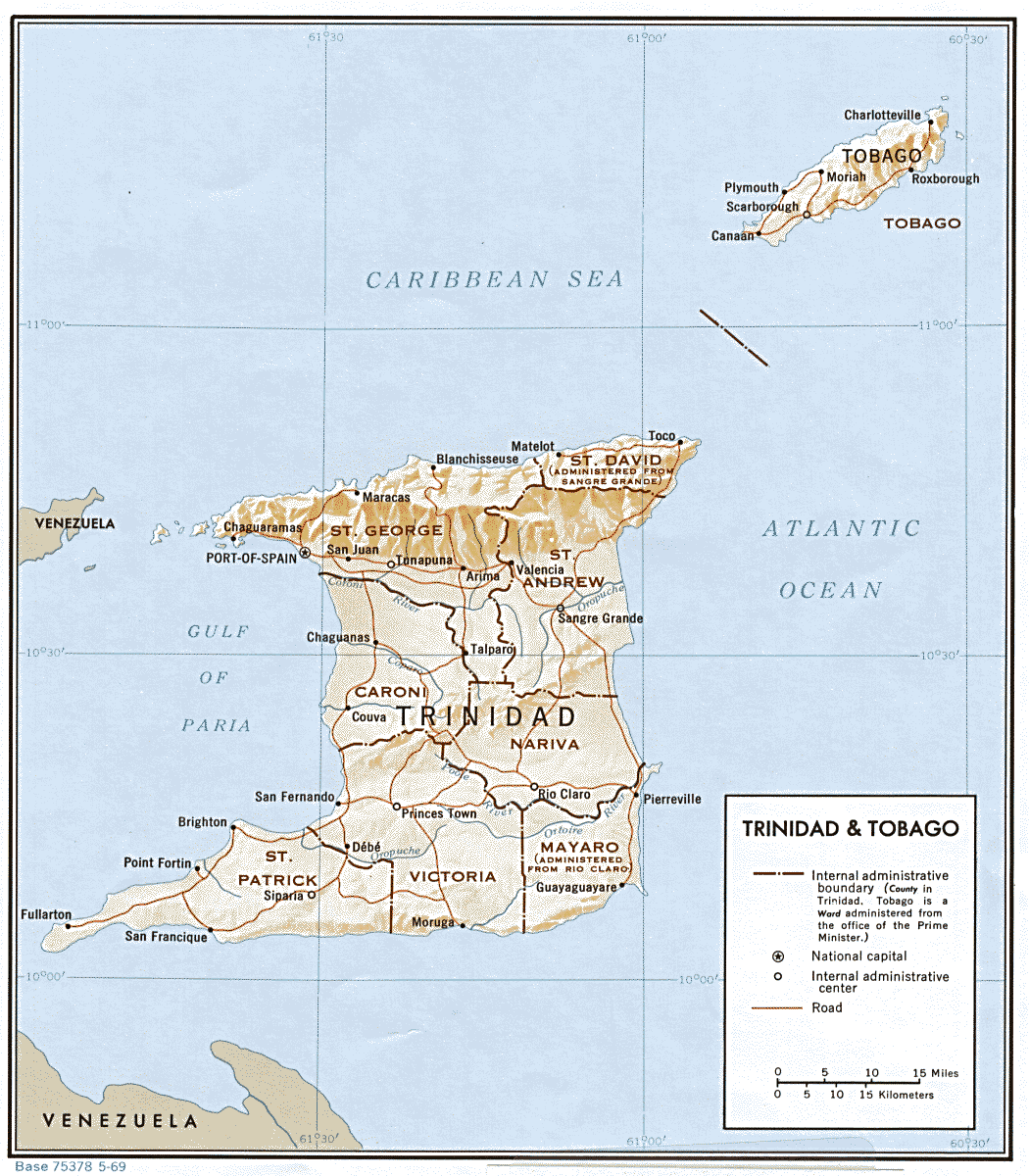
Map showing old counties of Trinidad

Mayaro is the name of a county on southeastern Trinidad island, in Trinidad and Tobago.

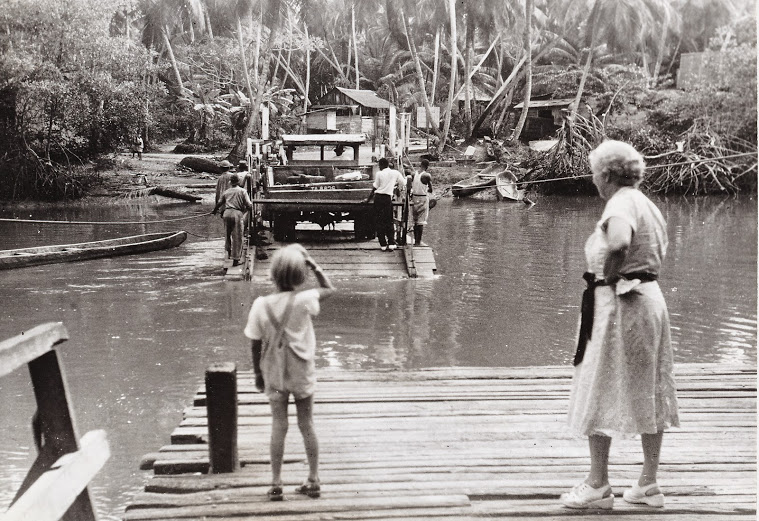
Old car ferry across river, Mayaro, Trinidad c. 1959

== History ==
The "Mayaro District" was the first area of settlement on the east coast. Many estates were granted to French planters who settled Trinidad in the late 18th century. No roads crossed the island and the area was only accessible by steamer until the late 19th century.

== Geography ==
The name Mayaro is applied to several villages along the coast. The county of Mayaro occupies a large area of southeastern Trinidad, but the name is usually only applied to the coastal strip. County Mayaro is divided into two wards: Trinity and Guayaguayare.

Along this strip a number of villages exist to which the name Mayaro is generally applied. From north to south these are: Kernaham/Cascadou, Ortoire, St. Joseph, Beau Sejour, Plaisance, Pierreville, Beaumont, St. Ann's, Radix, Ste. Marguerite, Lagon Doux, Grand Lagoon and Lagon Palmiste. Beyond that are several small villages and then the town of Guayaguayare.

Mayaro falls under the jurisdiction of the Rio Claro–Mayaro Regional Corporation. Until 1990 it was administered together with the neighbouring county of Nariva by the Nariva–Mayaro County Council.

== Economy ==
Mayaro is also associated with oil production - most of Trinidad's oil and natural gas production comes from offshore oil fields to the east of Mayaro. The major producer is BP Trinidad & Tobago (bpTT), together with BHP. Onshore oil production is under the control of Petrotrin, although a considerable area has been farmed out to small independent oil producers.

== Politics ==
Mayaro is covered by the Mayaro parliamentary constituency for elections to the House of Representatives.

== See also ==
- Mayaro Bay
- Ortoire River
