= Caparo River =

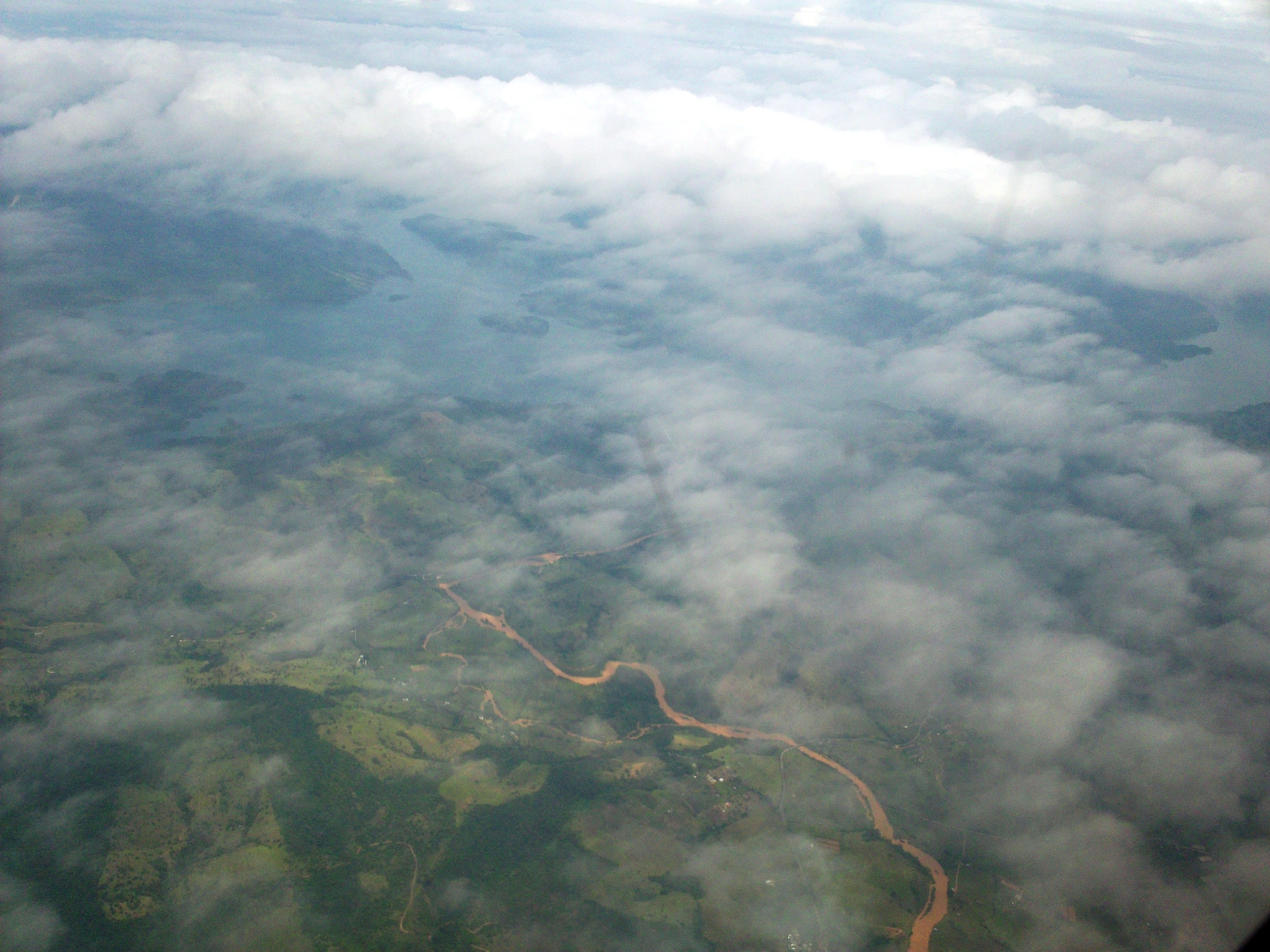
- Reservoir la Vueltosa and Rio Caparo

Location
- Country: Venezuela

Physical characteristics
- Mouth
  - location: 7.782°N 71.452°W

Caparo River (Spanish: Río Caparo) is a river of Venezuela. It is part of the Orinoco River basin and a tributary of the Sioca River, itself a tributary of the Apure River.

== See also ==
- List of rivers of Venezuela
