= Ortoire River =

River in Trinidad and Tobago

Coordinates: 10°20′N 61°00′W

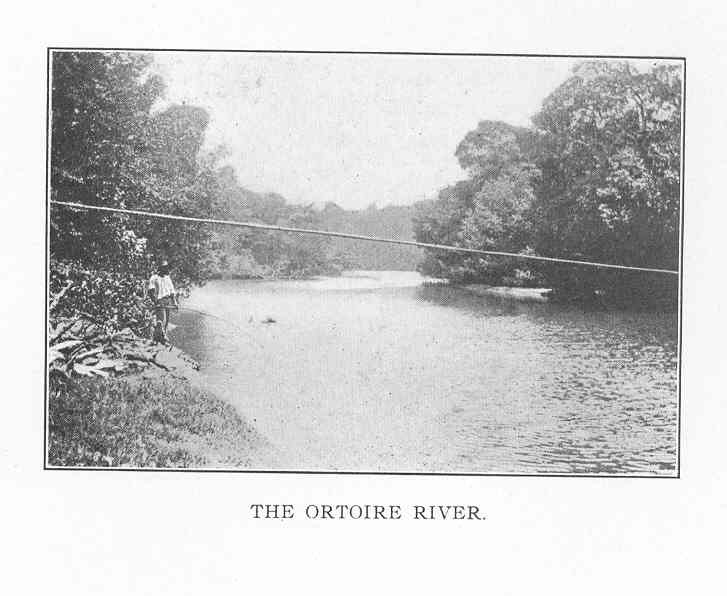
Ortoire River in 1910

The Ortoire River is a river in Trinidad and Tobago. It forms the boundary between Nariva County and Mayaro County in east Trinidad.

At over 55 km (34 mi) in length, it is one of Trinidad's longest rivers and is navigable by very small crafts for at least a third of its length from its mouth at the Atlantic coast near Point Radix and the village of Ortoire. It is green in color and it once had an iron bridge with wooden planks but that bridge has been replaced by an all paved concrete bridge; also it was made higher to reduce flooding. The river is famous for a bioluminescent blueish glow that is occasionally emitted by living organisms in the water.
