= Mayaro (parliamentary constituency) =

Trinidad and Tobago parliamentary constituency

- Constituency for the Parliament of Trinidad and Tobago
- Mayaro is number 28 on this map
- Electorate: 27,940 (2015)
- Major settlements: Mayaro

Current constituency
- Created: 2007
- Number of members: 1
- Member of Parliament: Nicholas Morris (UNC)

Mayaro is a parliamentary constituency in Trinidad and Tobago.

== Geography ==
The constituency is named for the town of Mayaro, Trinidad. It had an electorate of 27,940 as of 2015.

== Members ==
Election	Member	Party	Notes
2007	Winston Peters	UNC	
2010	Winston Peters	UNC	
2015	Rushton Paray	UNC	
2020	Rushton Paray	UNC	
2025	Nicholas Morris	UNC	

== Elections ==
2025 Trinidad and Tobago general election: Mayoro
Party	Candidate	Votes	%	±%
UNC	Nicholas Morris	11,241	70.1%	▲
PNM	Beatrice Bridglal	4,381	27.3%	▼
PF	Brittney Williams	347	2.2%	Steady
Majority		6,860	42.8%	
Turnout		16,030	54.62%	
Registered electors		29,346		
UNC hold		Swing	%	
