= Rio Claro, Trinidad and Tobago =

Rio Claro
- Town
- Location in Trinidad and Tobago
- Coordinates: 10°18′15″N 61°10′15″W
- Country: Trinidad and Tobago
- Region: Mayaro-Rio Claro

Population (2011)
  - Total: 8,881
- Postal Code: 86xxxx

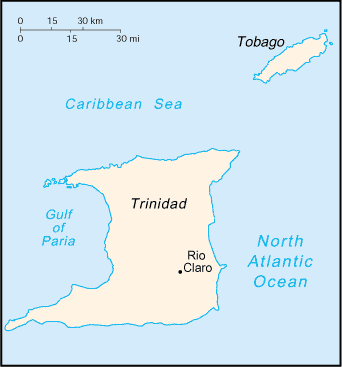
Location of Rio Claro in Trinidad and Tobago.

Rio Claro is the largest town in southeastern Trinidad, in Trinidad and Tobago. Rio Claro lies east of Princes Town, west of Mayaro and northwest of Guayaguayare. It serves as the major commercial centre for southeastern Trinidad. It lies in a primarily agricultural area. It is the seat of the Region of Mayaro–Rio Claro.

== History ==
The town was named for a small stream, which was named Rio Claro by Spanish surveyors in the 1770s. A "rest house" was built there in 1850 when a road was cut from Mission (now Princes Town) to Mayaro. As cacao planters settled the area, the village on the banks of the Rio Claro came to be called by that name. When the Trinidad Government Railway extended its line to this village in 1914, the name Rio Claro was formalised.

== Schools ==
Rio Claro currently has two secondary schools and 9 primary schools.

== Hunting and outdoor sports ==
The area is well known for its extensive yet accessible forests. The early lumber industry (circa 1930's) left many small trails, some of which were eventually paved over. This infrastructure development enabled not only the local farming populace but many avid hunters and fishermen access to these areas. Well into the 21st century the area is known throughout Trinidad as having exceptionally fruitful hunting (small game animals such as agouti, lappe and armadillo) and fishing grounds.

== Farming and cuisine ==
A large proportion of the area's residents still practice farming and hunting; however this is not a subsistence lifestyle by any means. The residents have incorporated many of the modern goods and cooking styles with the more traditional methods and ingredients, resulting in a unique array of dishes that is regularly eaten in homes every day.

Ground provisions, freshwater fish and small game animals (commonly referred to as "wild meat") are dominant in the cuisine in this area. Navet, a village in the Rio Claro area is famous for its dasheen plantations. Poultry, canned and other preserved goods are accompaniments to these meals. Food in this area is generally prepared with generous use of spices, seasonings and pepper – great pride is taken in ensuring that all ingredients (where possible) are cleaned. Cooking itself is a family affair, a group activity that allows for bonding and strengthening of relationships. One must not overlook that some of the tastiest doubles were sold in Rio Claro and that these vendors have won national competitions.

Overall this way of life, often viewed as being "hard" by outsiders, is what makes the residents in the area enjoy a slightly higher standard of living than other communities, as the food expenditure is less here than in other towns and villages.

The area's farms are well suited to grow a wide range of crops – the many small streams, ponds, hills and trails allow this to be possible. Crop rotation is still popular among many of the traditional cocoa, citrus, banana and coffee farmers although within the last ten years there has been a heavy investment in "new" crops such as various ground provisions (e.g.: yams, tubers, cassava), seasonings and fruits. A proportion of the harvest is sold within the southeastern corner of the island but a larger proportion is sold to export firms which export the produce to major West Indian centers in the North America.

== Lumber ==
For many years, the Rio Claro area has been the site of a commercial trade in Caribbean tropical hardwoods. The area contains natural stands of mahogany, cedar, appamatte, teak and mora, which are harvested by numerous small independent timberjacks in the area. Softer tropical timbers are also harvested and supplied to the sawmills of the area, at least three of which remain in operation, for use in the island's manufacturing and export industries.

The area is populated by carpenters and woodworkers who learned their trade from previous generations. They produce furniture, wood sculptures, and carpentry work distributed in Trinidad and the Caribbean region.

Starting from the early 1990s many of the stakeholders began a grassroots movement to conserve their forests (without governmental assistance). Harvested growths were replanted with new saplings (usually cedar, mahogany and teak) with the result that the industry is very much alive and strong in this part of the island.

== Bars ==
Rio Claro is known for the many bars/rum-shops – an offshoot of having been one of the last towns before reaching the oil rich fields of Guayaguayare in the 1970s. There are more bars in this little town than in any other. In one square kilometer off the center of Rio Claro there are 26 bars, and all of them are patronized. Many of the older 'watering holes' have receded with its original owners.

Many of the bars are integrated into the communities themselves. They act as meeting places for the strong village councils in the area as well as hosts for the many small club teams. Weekends usually see an eruption of various village cricket, football and card tournaments, often with major money prizes at stake.

The bars also function in the capacity of meeting areas during weddings, funerals and general holiday gatherings; indeed the high population density of these establishments makes them a convenient and affordable manner for local (and traditional) entertainment.

== Gallery ==
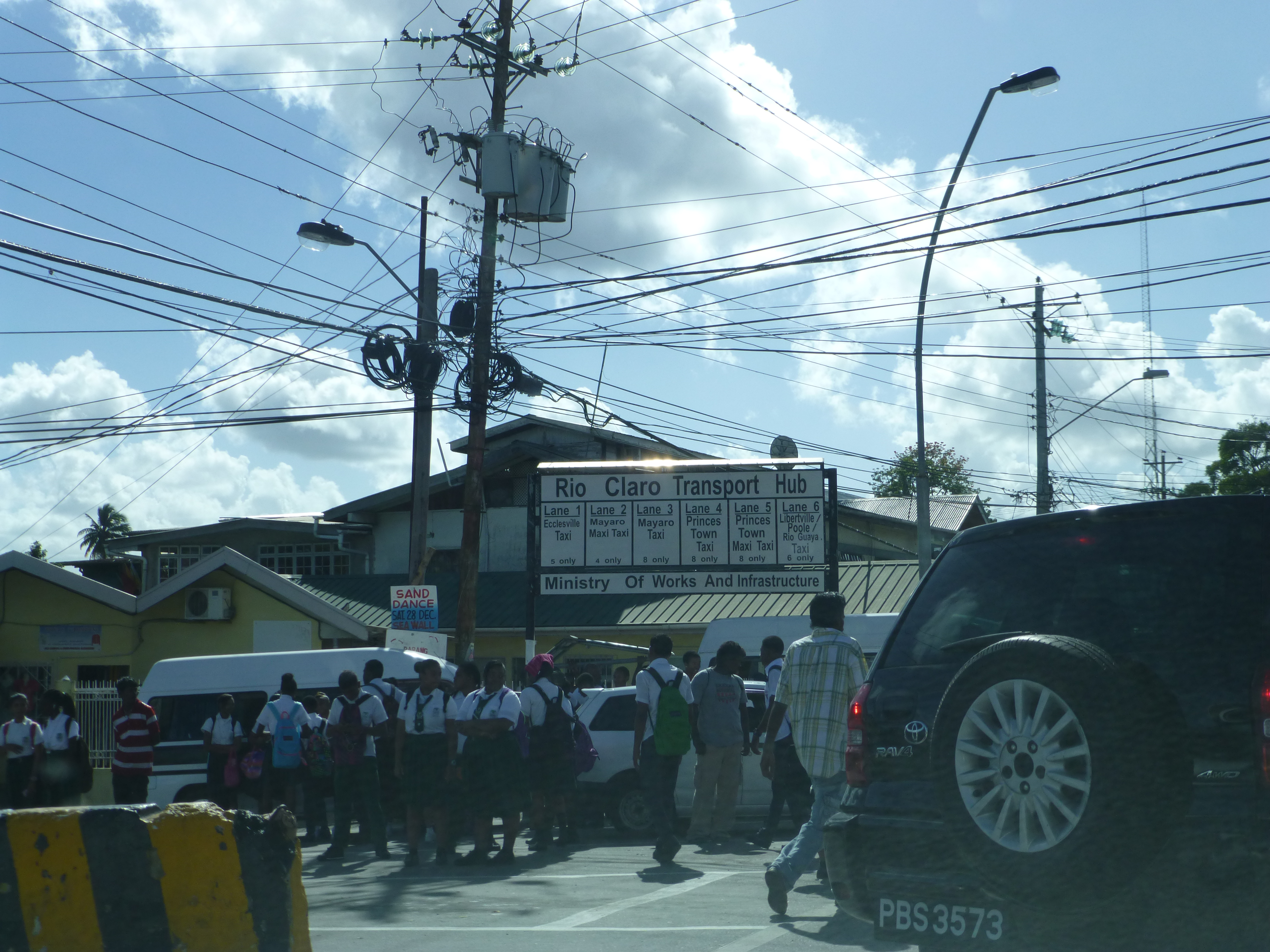
Maxi station

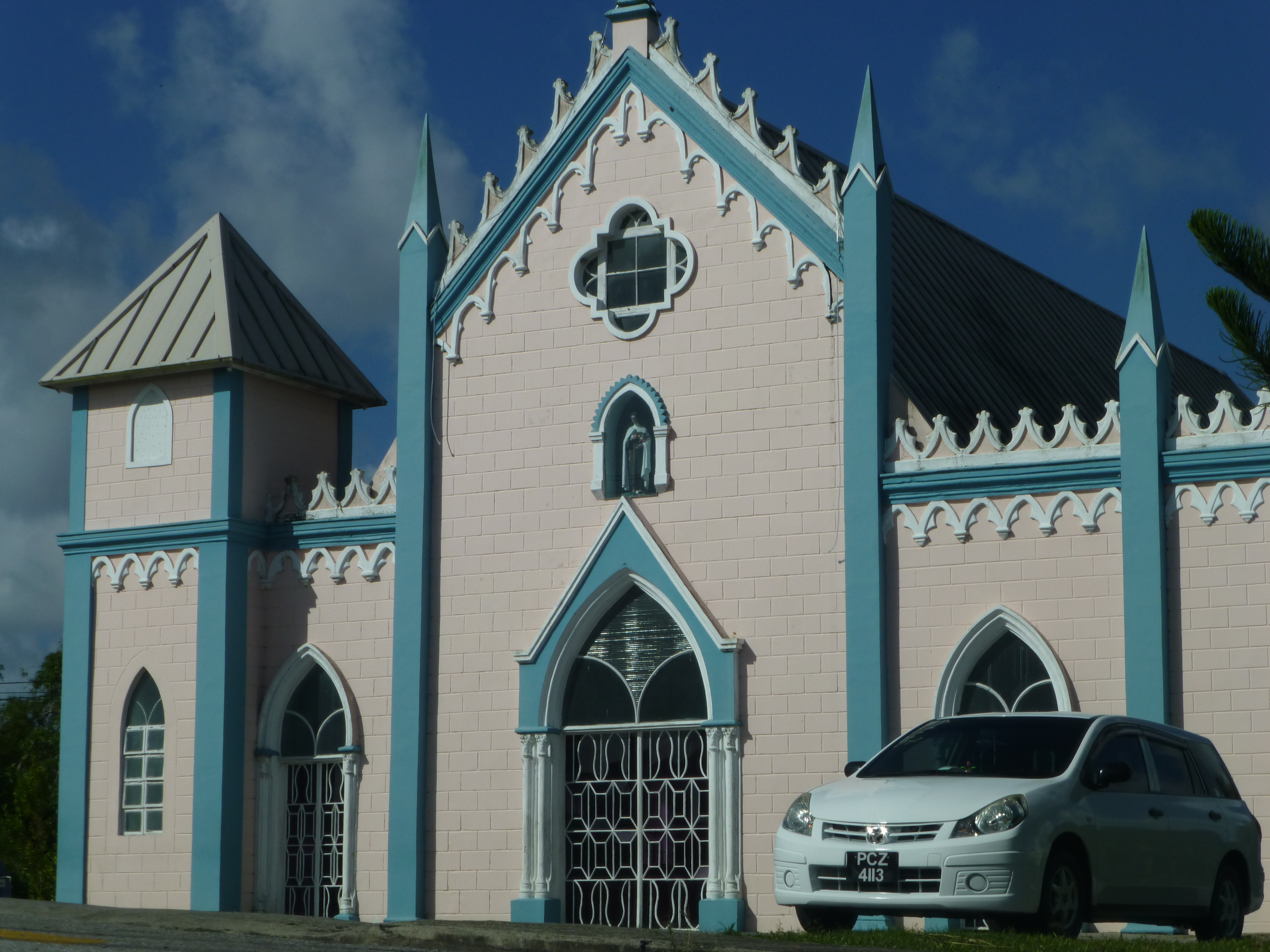
St. Theresa's RC church

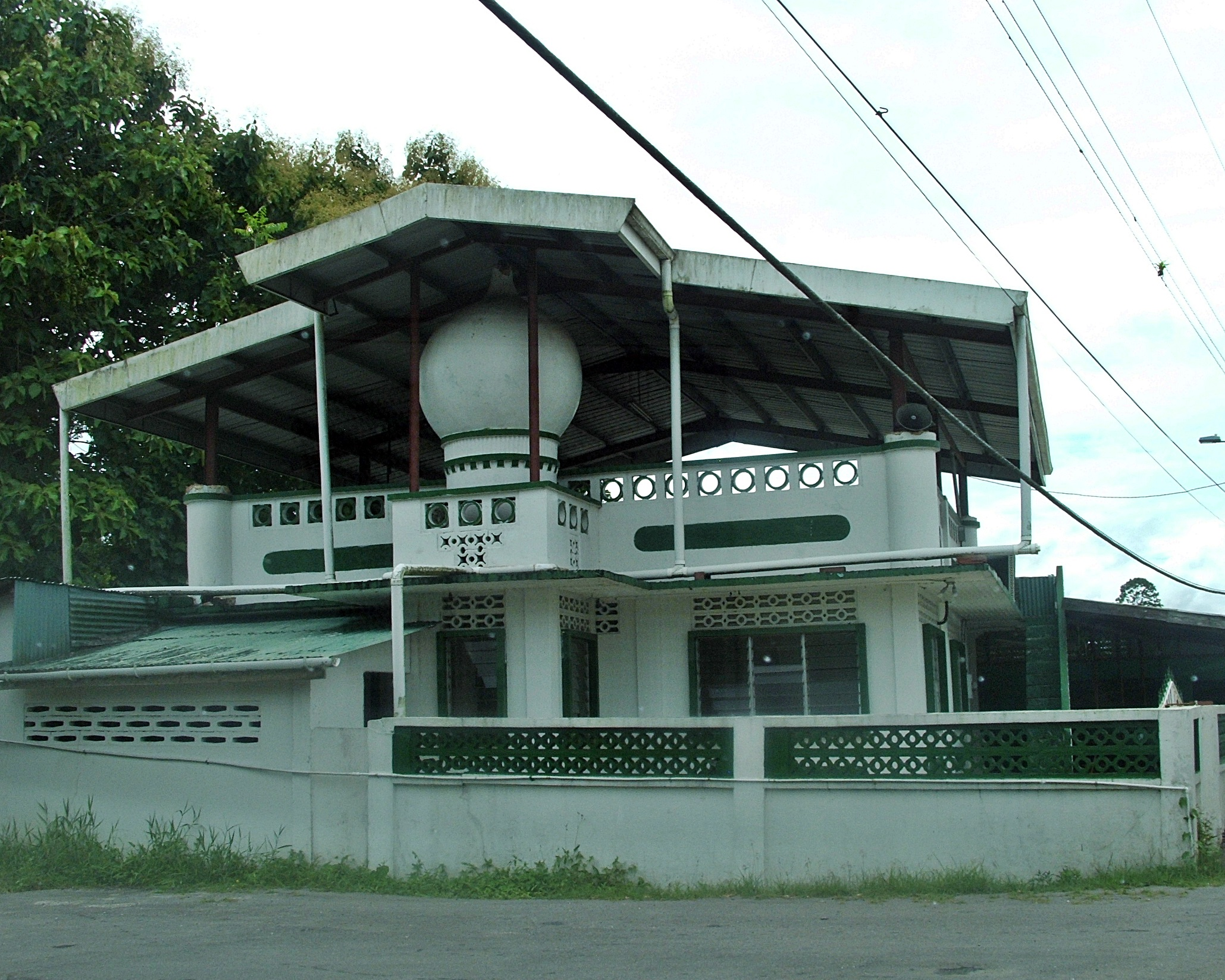
Brother's Road Mosque
