= Mayaro, Trinidad =

Mayaro
- Town
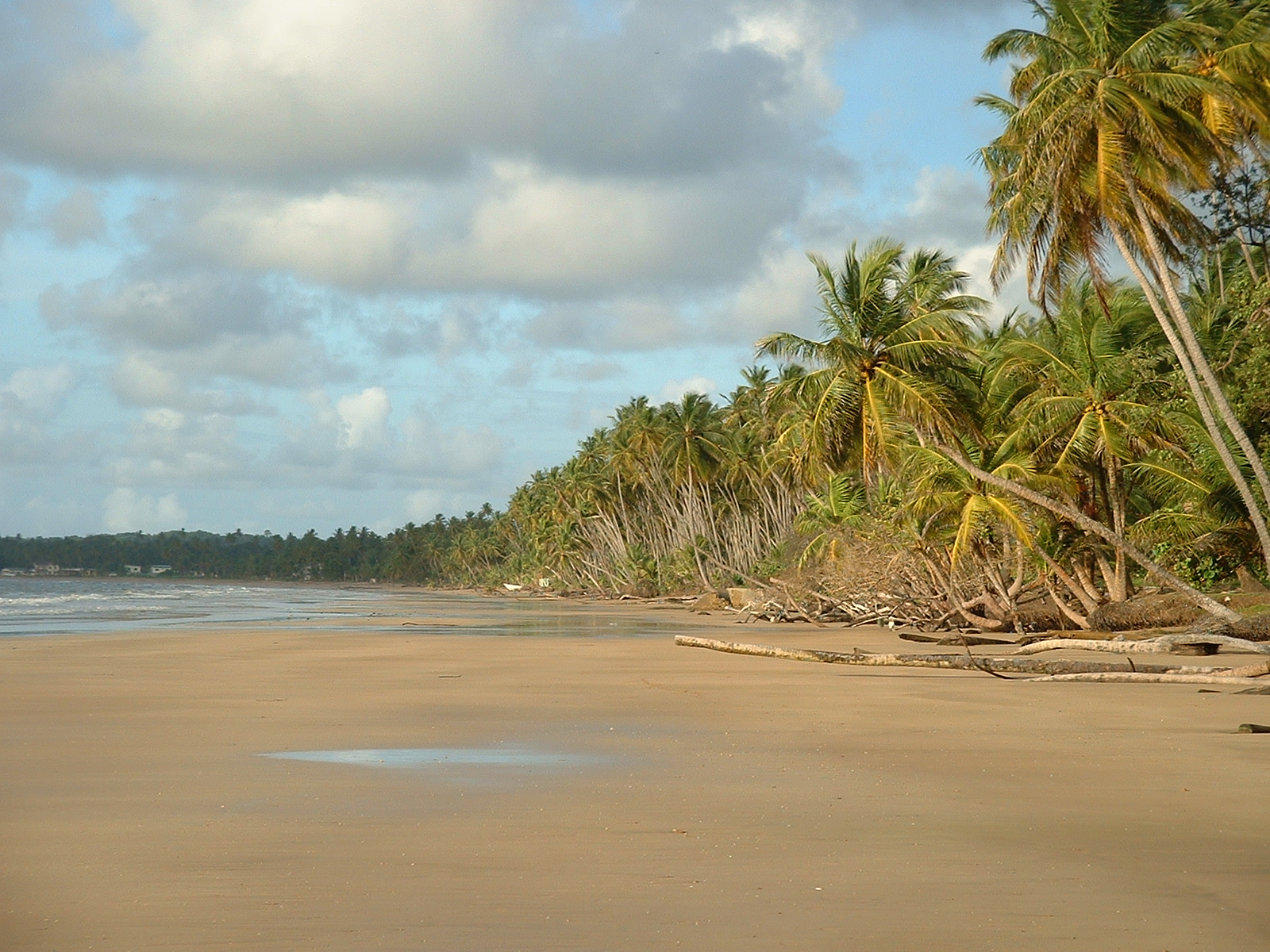
- Mayaro Bay, looking south

- Location in Trinidad and Tobago
- Coordinates: 10°17′52″N 61°00′24″W
- Country: Trinidad and Tobago
- Region: Mayaro-Rio Claro
- Named for: Maya Plant

Population (2011)
  - Total: 6,348
- Postal Code: 81xxxx

Mayaro is a town in the region of Mayaro–Rio Claro on the island of Trinidad in Trinidad and Tobago.

== Politics ==
Mayaro is part of the Mayaro parliamentary constituency for elections to the House of Representatives.

== See also ==
- List of cities and towns in Trinidad and Tobago
- Rio Claro, Trinidad and Tobago
