= Postal codes in Trinidad and Tobago =

In 2012, the government of Trinidad and Tobago approved the introduction of postal codes starting later that same year. In addition to the postal code implementation the country has embarked on a nationwide address improvement initiative adopting the Universal Postal Union (UPU) S-42 international standard of addressing. The UPU is an arm of the United Nations and is the coordinating body of postal services worldwide. The intent of this exercise is to correct poor addressing in Trinidad & Tobago and assign to each address a six-digit postal code. This change will result in the following:

• All buildings will carry a building/civic number
• Numbering will be sequential and logical
• Less reliance on mile markers, lot numbers, lamp post numbers and "corner of" in addressing.

As announced in 2012, each code would be a six-digit number, with the first two digits indicating one of 72 postal districts (64 in Trinidad, eight in Tobago). It was piloted in Point Fortin in 2013 and later tested in four other Trinidad communities, as well as the island of Tobago. It is now launched as of 2021 throughout all of the regions and municipalities of Trinidad and throughout Tobago.

== Example ==
According to Trinidad and Tobago Newsday, an envelope using the postcode may be properly addressed thus:

Structure of Trinidad and Tobago Postal Codes

Mr. James Doe
71 Beechwood Road
Goodside Gardens
DIEGO MARTIN 150110
TRINIDAD AND TOBAGO
_______________________
Mrs. Jane Doe
21 Darcy Avenue
Central Park
Balmain
COUVA 550214
TRINIDAD AND TOBAGO

In the example above, the digits "15" refer to the delivery office in Diego Martin; "01" to a certain delivery route served by that office; and "10" to a certain building or zone along that delivery route.

== History ==
Trinidad and Tobago Postal Corporation officially launched the system March 28, 2012, promising that residents and businesses would receive a postcard informing them of their new postal code "before the end of the year". In May 2016, the estimated completion date was given as "within a year or two."

In May 2011, TTPost said it planned to develop a postal code system in part because it is more efficient to sort mail using automated sorting machines, and in part because many areas in Trinidad and Tobago use vague or imprecise descriptive addresses based on "word of mouth and the use of landmarks". TTPost also said it also hoped develop a universal standard for addressing.

“Many of our business and residential addresses regularly include features such as lamp pole numbers, street addresses without a building number, lot numbers and mile markers and the phrase ‘corner of’ as means of identification," said Trinidad and Tobago Public Utilities Minister Nizam Baksh in 2013. “Such elements may be easily understood by those living in a community, but they not only make mail delivery tedious, but can also slow down the response of fire service and ambulance personnel who are responding to an emergency in the area."

Postal workers' representatives noted that along with increased efficiency in mail sorting, the system is expected to accompany a loss in mail sorter jobs. Advocates of the postal code system touted several side benefits. Classifying every address in a geographical postal code could aid in statistical analysis of crime and health care, for example.

== List of Postal Districts ==
District Code and Name (First two digits of the postal code)

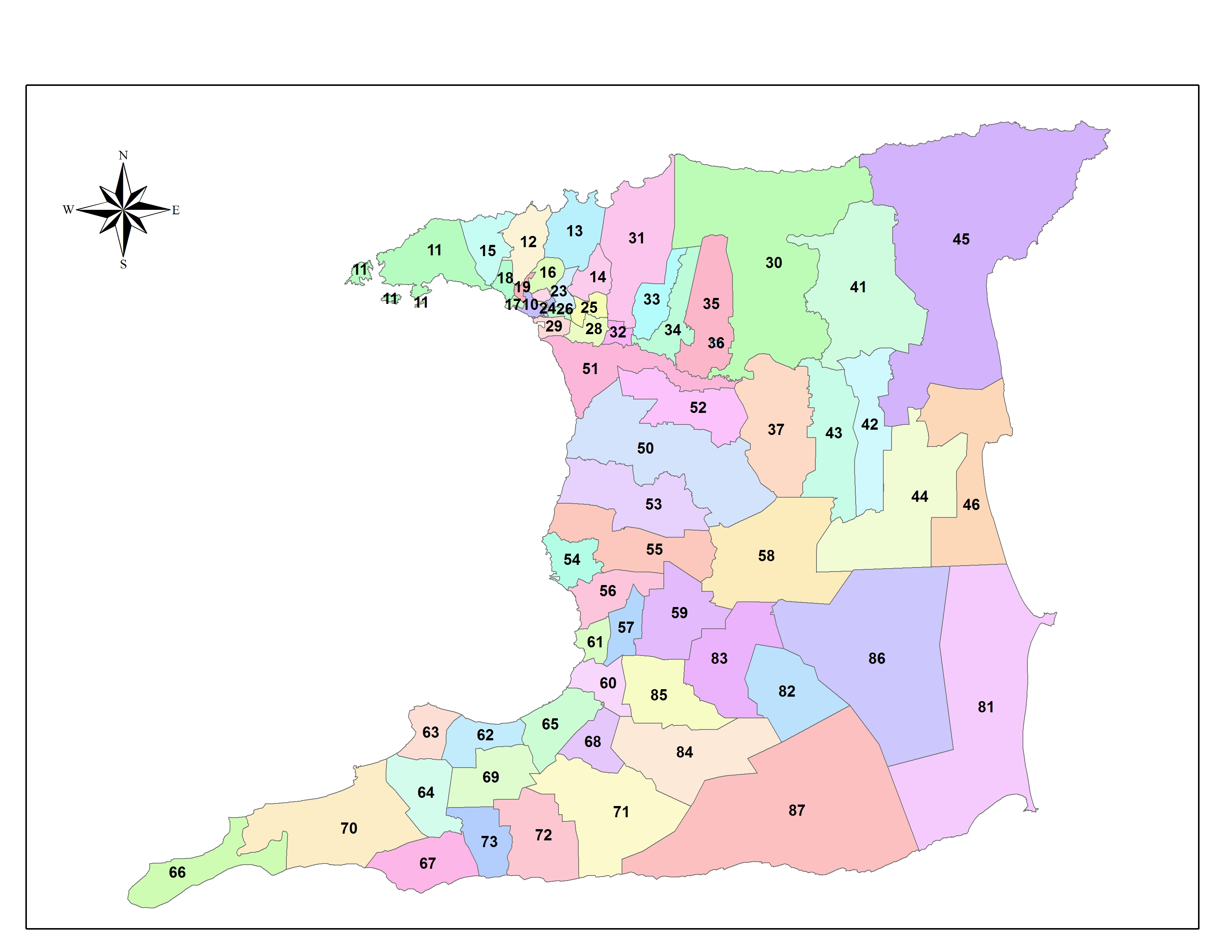
Postal Districts Map- Trinidad

Postal Districts of Tobago

List of Postal Districts
PD Code	PD NAME
10	PORT OF SPAIN
11	CARENAGE
12	MARAVAL
13	UPPER SANTA CRUZ
14	LOWER SANTA CRUZ
15	DIEGO MARTIN
16	ST. ANNS
17	WOODBROOK
18	ST. JAMES
19	NEWTOWN
21	GONZALES
22	MARCANO QUARRY
23	MORVANT
24	BELMONT
25	SAN JUAN
26	LAVENTILLE
27	BLUNDELL
28	EL SOCORRO
29	SEALOTS
30	ARIMA
31	CUREPE
32	VALSAYN
33	TUNAPUNA
34	TACARIGUA
35	AROUCA
36	MALONEY
37	LA HORQUETTA
41	VALENCIA
42	GUAICO
43	CUMUTO
44	BICHE
45	SANGRE GRANDE
46	MANZANILLA
50	CHAGUANAS
51	CARONI
52	CUNUPIA
53	CARAPICHAIMA
54	CALIFORNIA
55	COUVA
56	CLAXTON BAY
57	GASPARILLO
58	TABAQUITE
59	WILLIAMSVILLE
60	SAN FERNANDO
61	MARABELLA
62	SOUTH OROPOUCHE
63	LA BREA
64	GUAPO
65	LA ROMAINE
66	CEDROS
67	PALO SECO
68	DEBE
69	FYZABAD
70	POINT FORTIN
71	PENAL
72	SIPARIA
73	SANTA FLORA
81	MAYARO
82	TABLELAND
83	NEW GRANT
84	BARRACKPORE
85	PRINCES TOWN
86	RIO CLARO
87	MORUGA
90	SCARBOROUGH
91	CANAAN / BON ACCORD
92	LES COTEAUX / GOLDEN LANE
93	MORIAH
95	ROXBOROUGH
96	CASTARA
97	SPEYSIDE
98	CHARLOTTEVILLE
