= Mayaro–Rio Claro =

Region of Trinidad, Trinidad and Tobago

Mayaro–Rio Claro MRCRC
- Region
- Region of Mayaro–Rio Claro
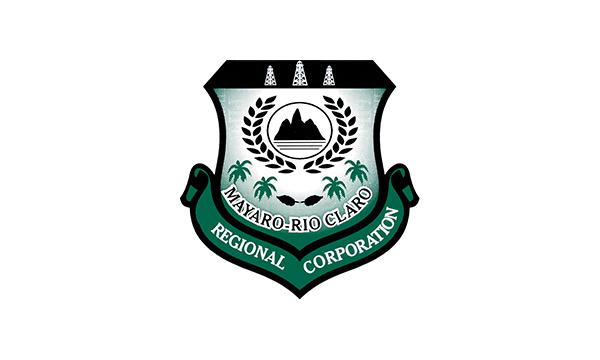
- Flag

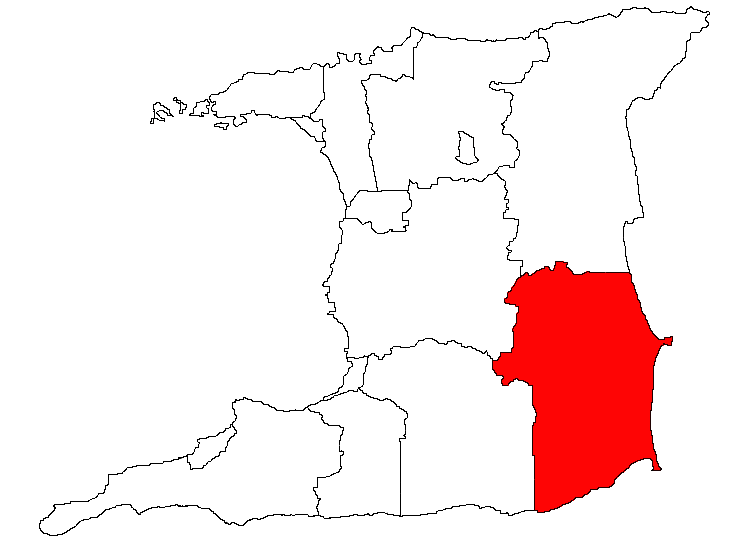
- Location of Mayaro-Rio Claro in Trinidad
- Coordinates: 10°17′52.4″N 61°0′24.1″W
- Country: Trinidad and Tobago
- Historic Counties: Mayaro and Nariva
- Former Regions: Mayaro; Rio Claro
- Coastline: Atlantic Ocean
- Founded: 17 July 1992
- Capital: Mayaro

Area
  - Total: 814 km^{2} (314 sq mi)

Population (2011)
  - Total: 35,650
  - Density: 43.8/km^{2} (113/sq mi)
- Time zone: UTC-4 (Atlantic Standard Time)
  - Summer (DST): -4
- Area codes: +1 (868) 630, 644
- ISO 3166 code: TT-MRC
- Website: mayarorioclaro.com

Mayaro–Rio Claro is a region of Trinidad. The local government body is Mayaro–Rio Claro Regional Corporation, a Regional Corporation of Trinidad and Tobago. The region has a land area of 852.81 km^{2} (329.27 sq mi). The Mayaro–Rio Claro Regional Corporation is headquartered in Rio Claro. Other towns include Mayaro.

The region possesses many beach front properties and Trinidad's largest reservoir of natural gas and crude oil along its eastern coast. It includes the Ortoire Block, an 184-square-kilometre (71 sq mi) resource exploration area where Trinidad's largest onshore natural gas discovery was found in the Ortoire syncline.

== Mayaro–Rio Claro Regional Corporation ==
The Corporation's area of responsibility comprises 39 discrete communities. It has the second largest landmass of any Regional Corporation in Trinidad. The Regional Corporation is governed by the Municipal Corporation's Act No. 8 of 1992 and is one of fourteen such bodies under the Ministry of Local Government. Two of the 41 Trinidadian electoral districts are located in Mayaro–Rio Claro: Mayaro and Moruga/Tableland.

== Sources ==
- Local Government Corporations, from Nalis, the National Library and Information Service of Trinidad and Tobago.
- Mayaro Rio Claro Corporation Website, from Mayaro Rio Claro Corporation Information Services
