= St Clair, Port of Spain =

Business and residential district in Port of Spain, Trinidad and Tobago

Coordinates: 10°40′13.66″N 61°31′15.88″W

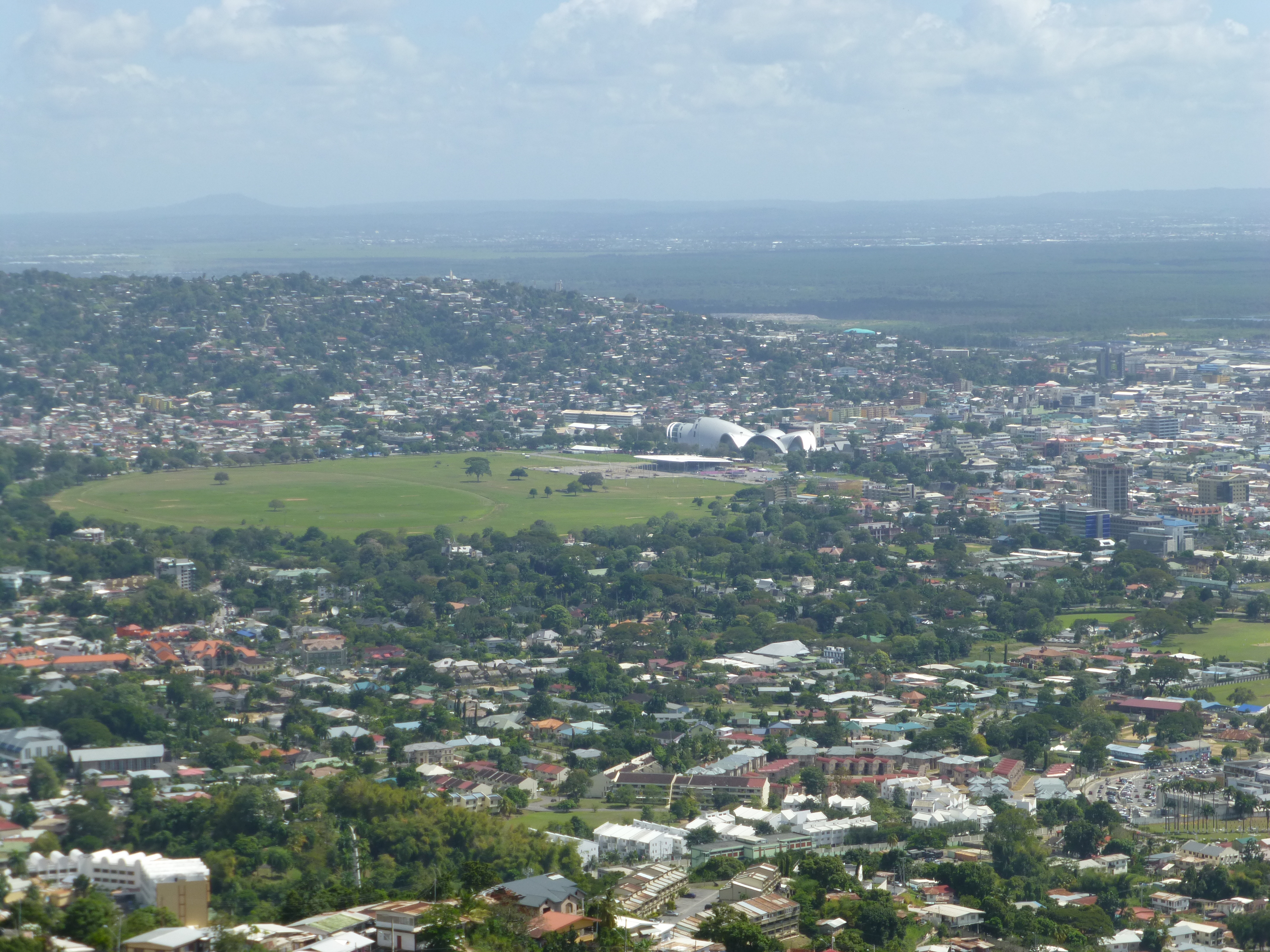
Queen's Park Savannah, surrounded by St Clair and St James (front) and Belmont and Laventille (behind). Uptown is to the right of the park. (The image faces east.)

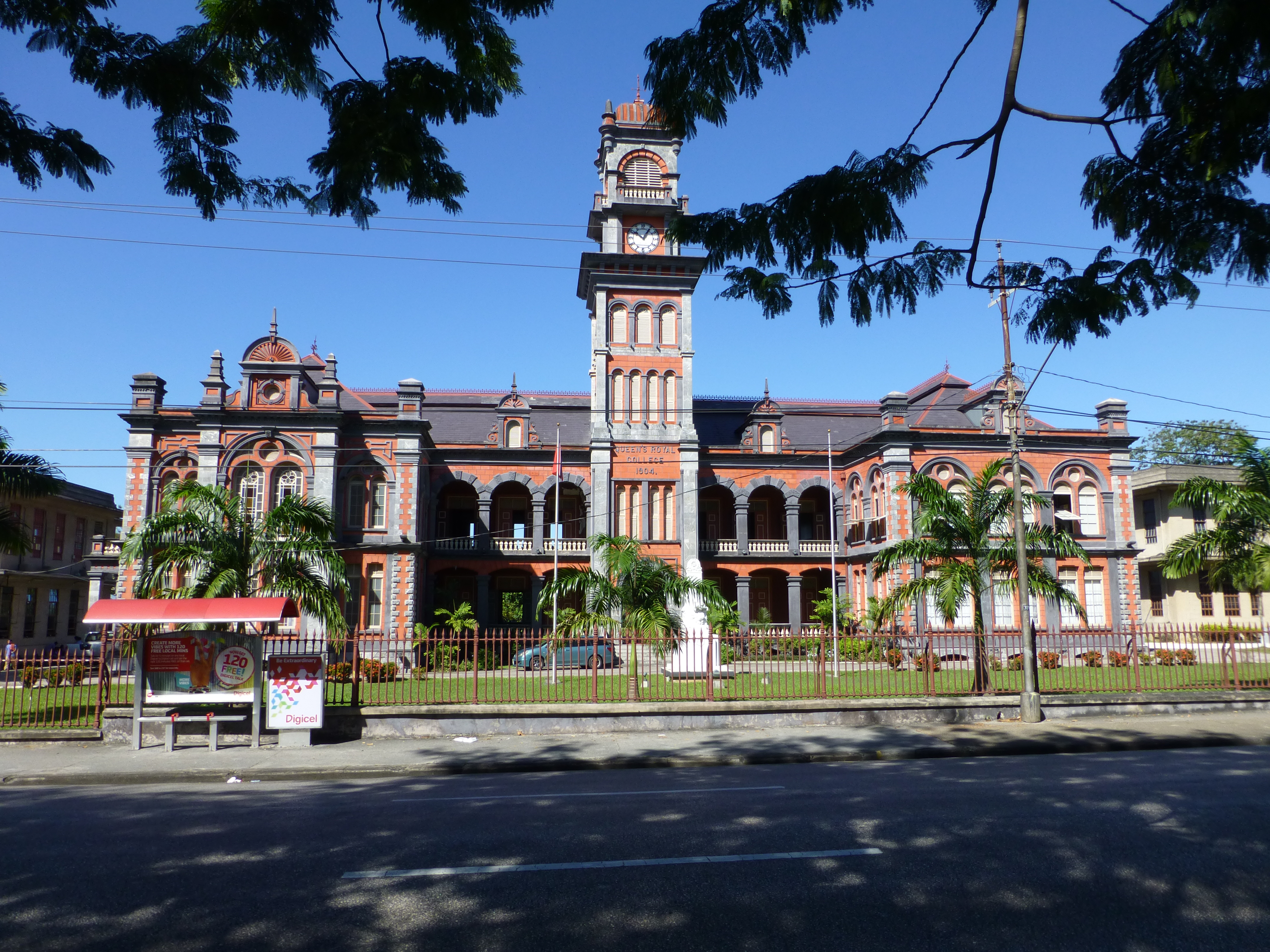
Queen's Royal College, one of the Magnificent Seven Houses in the St Clair neighborhood.

Saint Clair is a business and residential district between the Queen's Park Savannah and the Maraval River in Port of Spain, Trinidad and Tobago. It is home to most of the city's grandest and largest mansions and also home to the Magnificent Seven Houses. Federation Park and Ellerslie Park. St Clair is one of Port of Spain's five police districts.

In 1893, St Clair was host to the Inter-Colonial Cup, a three-way cricket match between Trinidad and Tobago (then Trinidad), Barbados, and the-then British Guiana. Only white players were allowed, and that excluded most of the home side's best cricketers.
