= Port of Spain International Waterfront Centre =

Construction project in Port of Spain, Trinidad and Tobago

Coordinates: 10°39′5.70″N 61°31′17.27″W

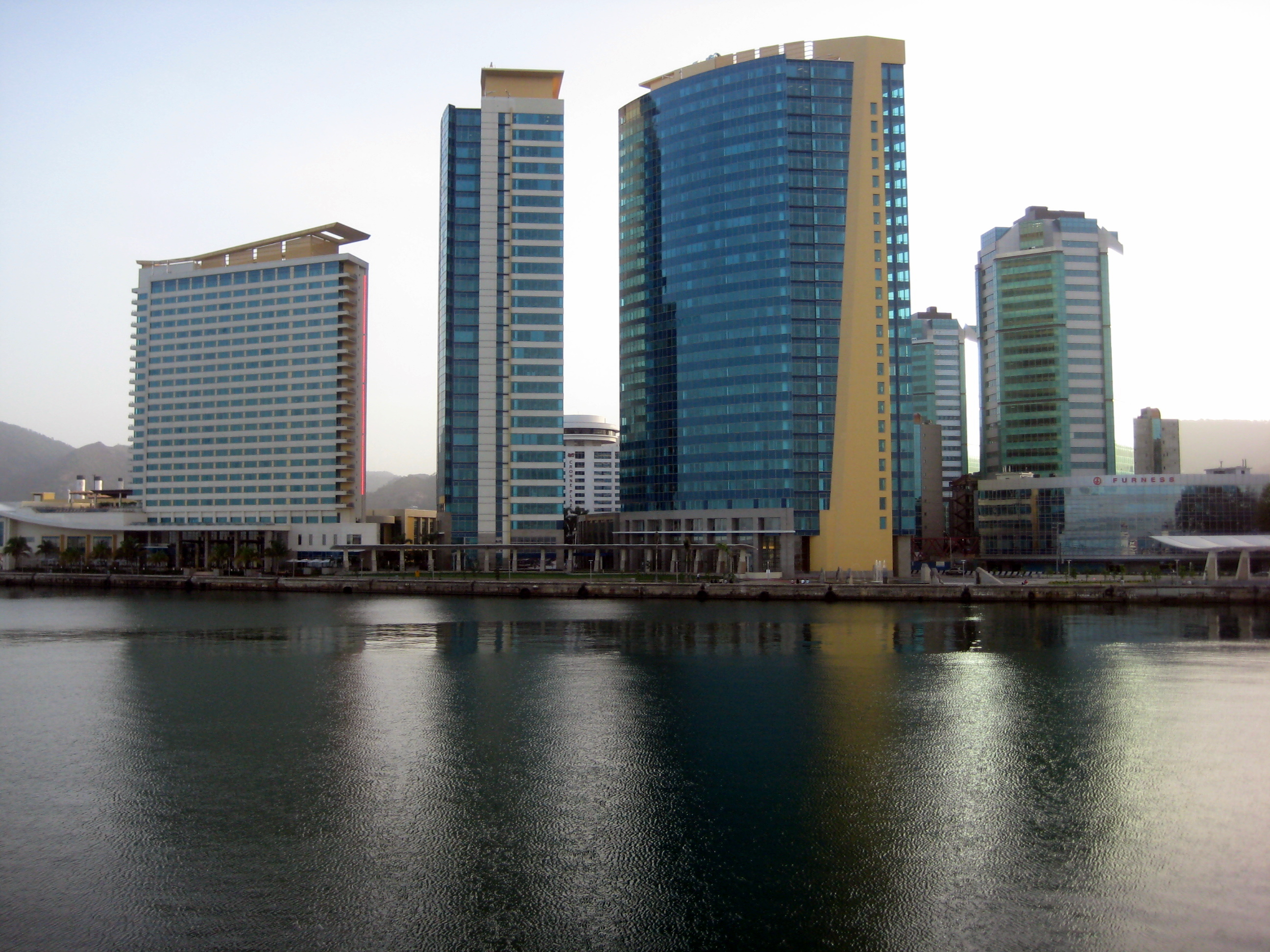
The Port of Spain International Waterfront Centre

The Port of Spain International Waterfront Centre is a construction project aimed at revitalising and transforming the waterfront of the capital-city Port of Spain located in Trinidad and Tobago. The project is a part of the overall Vision 2020, a government policy attempting to take Trinidad and Tobago to developed country status by 2020. That policy has since been shelved. The towers, which were supposed to usher in the beginning of a "Financial Centre" never materialized, and have slowly been occupied by government departments and offices.

The master plan involves constructing two 26-story office towers, a 22-story Hyatt Regency Hotel, and the English-speaking Caribbean region's largest conference centre. It was completed in 2009. It has since become the tallest building in Trinidad and Tobago at 120 m (390 ft) tall.

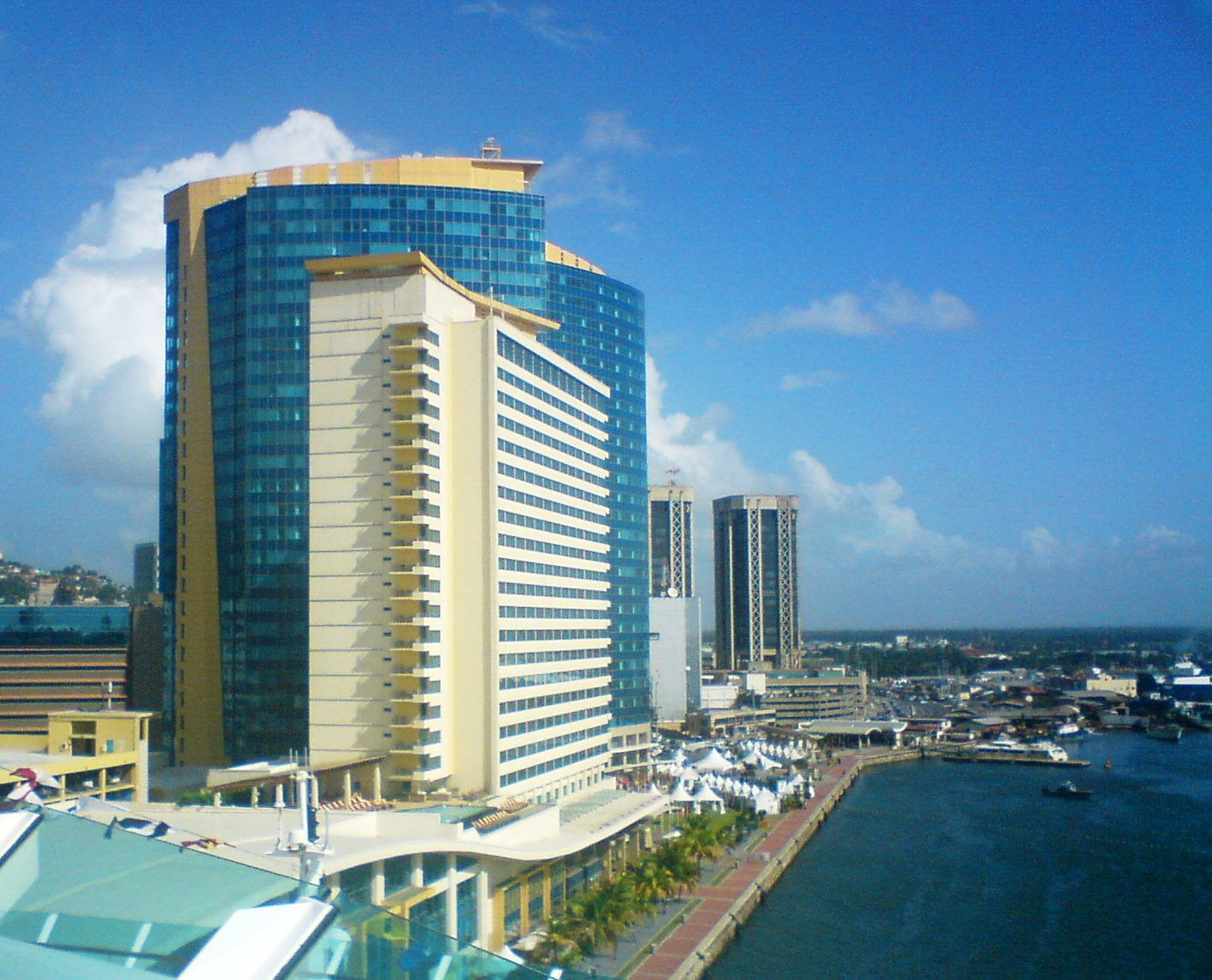
Hyatt Trinidad and Towers D and C of the International Waterfront

The location of the complex is #1 Wrightson Road, Port of Spain.
