= Federation Park =

Locale in Trinidad and Tobago

Coordinates: 10°40′32″N 61°31′34″W

Federation Park is an upscale residential neighbourhood in northwestern Port of Spain, Trinidad and Tobago. Federation Park was built to house delegates to the Federal Parliament of the West Indies Federation. As a result of this, the streets in Federation Park are named for the various territories which made up the Federation. After the dissolution of the Federation in 1962 the houses in Federation Park were used to house senior civil servants and professionals in the government service.

By the mid-1990s, many of these houses were later sold off to private owners, mainly affluent business persons and non-governmental professionals. Today a fairly large portion of these houses have been either renovated or completely replaced by more modern multimillion-dollar mansions that are rented out to foreign embassies as residences and oil companies to house their expatriate senior staff.
