= Ellerslie Park =

Residential development in Trinidad and Tobago

Coordinates: 10.6778°N 61.5247°W

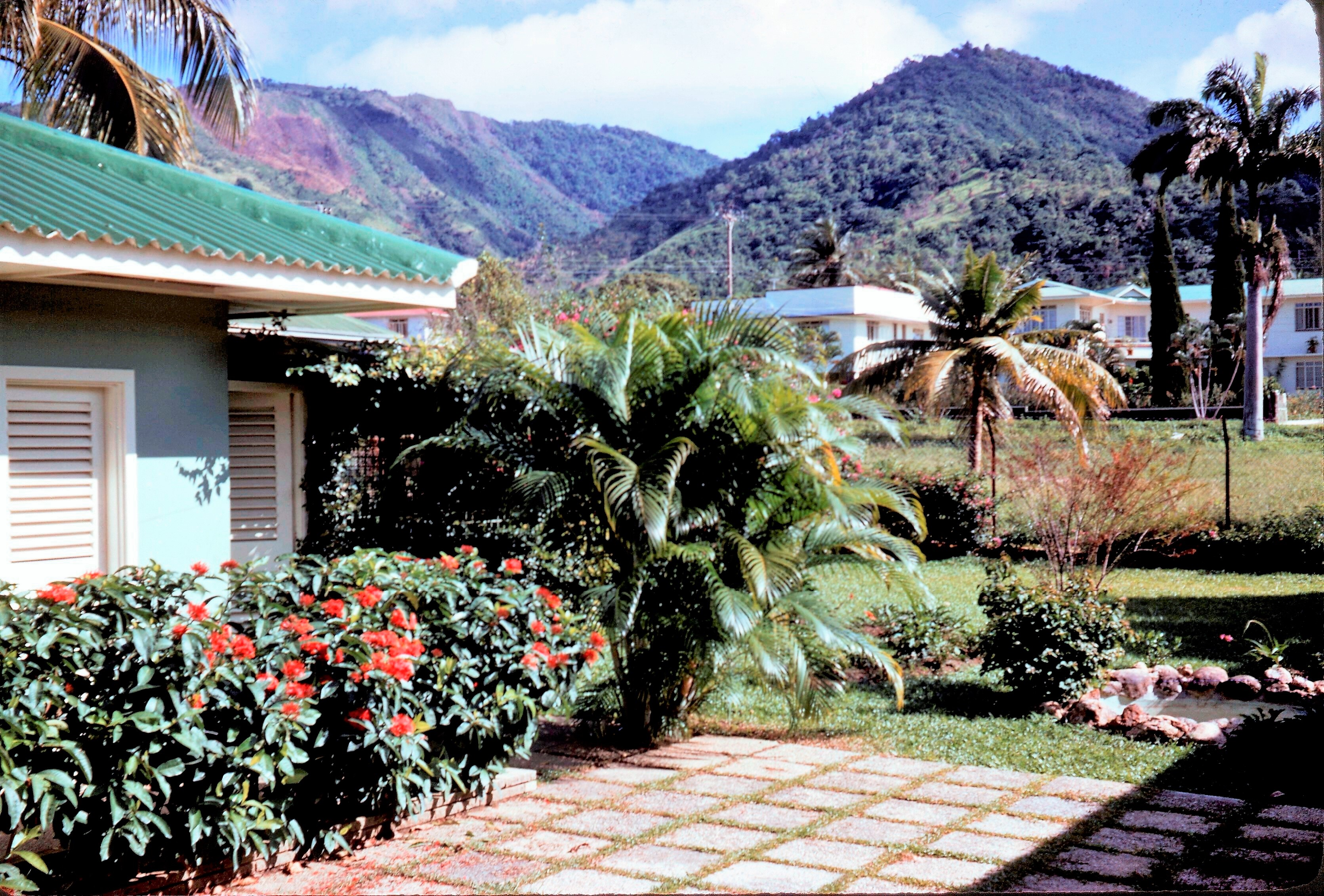
View from home in Ellerslie Park, Port of Spain, 1967

Ellerslie Park is an exclusive residential development in the northwestern corner of Port of Spain, Trinidad and Tobago. The development is in the shape of an oval with a single entrance. No two homes are the same, a result of each home being built to the specifications of its original owner. Apart from private homes, Ellerslie Park is also the location of official residencies belonging to senior government officials and foreign diplomats. It is located within walking distance of the Queen's Park Savannah and various hotels and shopping facilities.

== Status ==
It is the smallest administrative unit in Trinidad and Tobago, as compared to the German location. This community covers a few streets in urban areas, but also large areas in rural areas. Trinidad and Tobago is administratively divided into 612 communities, Ellerslie Park being one of them. The term "district" has only an informal meaning in Trinidad and Tobago.

== Position ==
Ellerslie Park is located to the north west of the Port of Spain, on the border between the large boroughs of Saint James and Maraval. Ellerslie Park is bounded on the east by Saddle Road and on the north by Long Circular Road. It borders the Long Circular community to the west and Federation Park to the south. Formally, Ellerslie Park is in the territory of three administrative regions of Trinidad, namely the autonomous city of Port of Spain and the regions of Diego Martin and San Juan-Laventille. However, the community is managed exclusively by the Port of Spain.

== Story ==
The area of what is now Ellerslie Park belonged to the Swiss Zurcher family in the late 19th century, who had migrated to Trinidad around 1850, and who named their mansion and its surrounding areas the Blarneys. Around 1900 the property was bought and renamed "Ellerslie" by the English-born Rapsey family, who owned food processing plants and plantations in Trinidad. The name "Ellerslie" comes from Old English and means "field of elder trees" or "field of elder bushes". The reason the Rapsey family gave the area that name is unknown. Elderberry does not grow in Trinidad, but it does in the family's English homeland.

From 1939 to 1943 there was an internment camp for Germans who were imprisoned as opponents of the war between Trinidadian colonial power and Great Britain in the area of today's Ellerslie Park. Ironically, this only affected a few German soldiers (mostly captured U-boat crews) or members of the merchant marine, but primarily the almost 600 Jews of German origin who had fled to Trinidad from the Nazi regime. From 1955 the area was used again for civil purposes when the Office of the British High Commissioner bought the property at 1 Ellerslie Park and had the British Trade Commissioner's home built there.

In the 1960s, Ellerslie Park briefly made national headlines when an Islamic Missionaries Guild (IMG) cultural center was to be built on its western edge - immediately adjacent to the residence of the US Ambassador, who promptly intervened with the Trinidadian government. The latter granted the request and offered IMG an alternative plot of land in the Mucurapo district further south-west. In 1976, the Trinidadian writer Marion Patrick Jones erected a monument to the district whose elegant villas represent the life goal of the lower-middle-class Grant family in her novel J'Ouvert Morning.

== Economy and transport ==
Ellerslie Park is an upper-class neighborhood; many diplomats and senior civil servants live there. In the southeast of the community is Ellerslie Plaza, a large shopping center with restaurants and boutiques. The neighborhood is home to the Trinidadian branch of China Railway Construction, a Chinese state-owned railway company – Trinidad hasn't had a railway since 1968. Ellerslie Park is connected via Saddle Road to the center of Port of Spain with the district of St. Clair and Queen's Park Savannah as well as to the North Coast Road leading to the north coast of Trinidad. All tourist traffic between Port of Spain and the north coast beaches passes through Ellerslie Park. The Saint James district is accessed via the Long Circular Road.

== Facilities ==
The Catholic Church of the Assumption, serving the northern Maraval neighborhood, is in the community area. Designed by Anthony C. Lewis in 1948, the building is considered an example of modern Trinidadian architecture.

== Personalities ==
Former Prime Minister and President of Trinidad A.N.R. Robinson lived in Ellerslie Park until his death.
