= Binibining Pilipinas 1995 =

- Date: March 12, 1995
- Presenters: Edu Manzano; G. Toengi; Christine Bersola; Dyan Castillejo
- Entertainment: Ariel Rivera
- Venue: Araneta Coliseum, Quezon City, Philippines
- Broadcaster: ABS-CBN
- Entrants: 40
- Placements: 15
- Winner: Joanne Santos; Manila
- Congeniality: Caroline Pobre; Manila
- Photogenic: Esabela Cabrera; Cavite

Binibining Pilipinas 1995 was the 32nd edition of Binibining Pilipinas. It took place at the Araneta Coliseum in Quezon City, Metro Manila, Philippines on March 12, 1995.

At the end of the event, Charlene Gonzales crowned Joanne Santos as Binibining Pilipinas Universe 1995, Caroline Subijano crowned Reham Snow Tago as Binibining Pilipinas World 1995, and Alma Concepcion crowned Gladys Dueñas as Binibining Pilipinas International 1995. Caroline Pobre was named First Runner-Up, and Margaret Laing was named Second Runner-Up.

== Results ==
Color keys

- The contestant was a Semi-Finalist in an International pageant.
- The contestant did not place.

Placement	Contestant	International placement
Binibining Pilipinas Universe 1995	Bb. #30 – Joanne Santos	Unplaced - Miss Universe 1995
Binibining Pilipinas World 1995	Bb. #1 – Reham Snow Tago	Unplaced - Miss World 1995
Binibining Pilipinas International 1995	Bb. #7 – Gladys Andre Dueñas	Top 15 - Miss International 1995
1st runner-up	Bb. #40 – Caroline Pobre	
2nd runner-up	Bb. #29 – Margaret Laing	
Top 15	Bb. #18 – Michelle Farrah Leaño; Bb. #20 – Glorigil Baltazar; Bb. #21 – Maria Christina de Guzman; Bb. #22 – Joanne Lopez; Bb. #24 – Jewel May Lobaton; Bb. #25 − Melissa Medina; Bb. #28 − Marjorie Jennifer Poblador; Bb. #31 − Rachiel Gonzales; Bb. #37 − Nena Ann de la Peña; Bb. #39 − Lorena Pangan	

== Contestants ==
39 contestants competed for the three titles:

No.	Contestant	Age	City/Province
1	Reham Snow Tago	18	Manila
2	Esabela Molina Cabrera	17	Cavite
3	Anna Marie Aviles	23	Makati
4	Maricris Realubin	17	Pangasinan
5	Annatalia Casalla	21	Rosario, Cavite
6	Olivia Lacson	21	Southern Tagalog
7	Gladys Andre Dueñas	22	Pagadian
8	Leilani Salvador	18	Cavite City
9	Veronica Uy	20	Isabela
10	Angelica Balignasay	18	Daet, Camarines Norte
11	Christine Alba	25	Marikina
12	Gloria Jane Nicholas	22	Tarlac
13	Darlene Gemma Sagolili	20	Filipino Community of North America
14	Katherine Timbol	20	Mabalacat, Pampanga
15	Sheryl Buyco	23	Bacolod
17	Reynalyn Dejan	18	Mandaluyong
18	Michelle Farrah Leaño	18	Bulacan
19	Abigail Uyyco	24	Bulacan
20	Glorigil Guillerma Baltazar	19	Makati
21	Maria Christina de Guzman	21	Antipolo
22	Joanne Lopez	23	Manila
23	Jacqueline Dimalanta	22	Quezon City
24	Jewel May Lobaton	18	Bacolod
25	Melissa Medina	21	Mandaluyong
26	Stella Ruiz	20	Quezon City
27	Sandra Nebres	19	Quezon City
28	Marjorie Jennifer Poblador	25	Bacolod
29	Margaret Laing	20	Cainta, Rizal
30	Joanne Santos	18	Parañaque
31	Rachiel Gonzales	21	Tabaco, Albay
32	Charito Corcolon	20	Pasay
33	Maria Criselda dela Peña	20	Biñan, Laguna
34	Mary Joy de Leon	21	Quezon City
35	Cheryl Tumulva	21	Isabela
36	Marilou Rustia	21	Makati
37	Nena Ann dela Peña	20	Manila
38	Roselle Ivy Banadera	17	San Pedro, Laguna
39	Lorena Pangan	21	Angeles City
40	Caroline Pobre	23	Las Piñas

== Notes ==
=== Post-pageant notes ===
- Joanne Santos did not place in Miss Universe 1995 in Windhoek, Namibia. However, she was appointed to represent the Philippines in Miss Tourism International 1997 and won.
- Reham Snow Tago did not place in Miss World 1995 in Sun City, South Africa. On the other hand, Gladys Dueñas was chosen as one of the 15 semifinalists in Miss International 1995 in Tokyo, Japan.
- Jewel May Lobaton competed again at Binibining Pilipinas 1998, and was awarded as First Runner-Up. Later, Tisha Silang resigned as Binibining Pilipinas-Universe 1998 due to citizenship issues and was replaced by Lobaton. Lobaton competed in Miss Universe 1998 in Honolulu, Hawaii but was unplaced. Nena Ann dela Peña also competed at Binibining Pilipinas 1998, but was unplaced.
- Esabela Cabrera competed in Mutya ng Pilipinas 1997 and was crowned as Mutya ng Pilipinas-Asia Pacific 1997. Later that year, Cabrera was asked to resign due to speculations that she is married and is also pregnant. She competed again at Binibining Pilipinas 1998 and was one of the semifinalists until she was appointed as Second Runner-Up after Elsie Sicat, the Second Runner-Up, assumed the First Runner-Up position that was previously awarded to Jewel May Lobaton.
