= Lim Kah Wai =

Malaysian film director

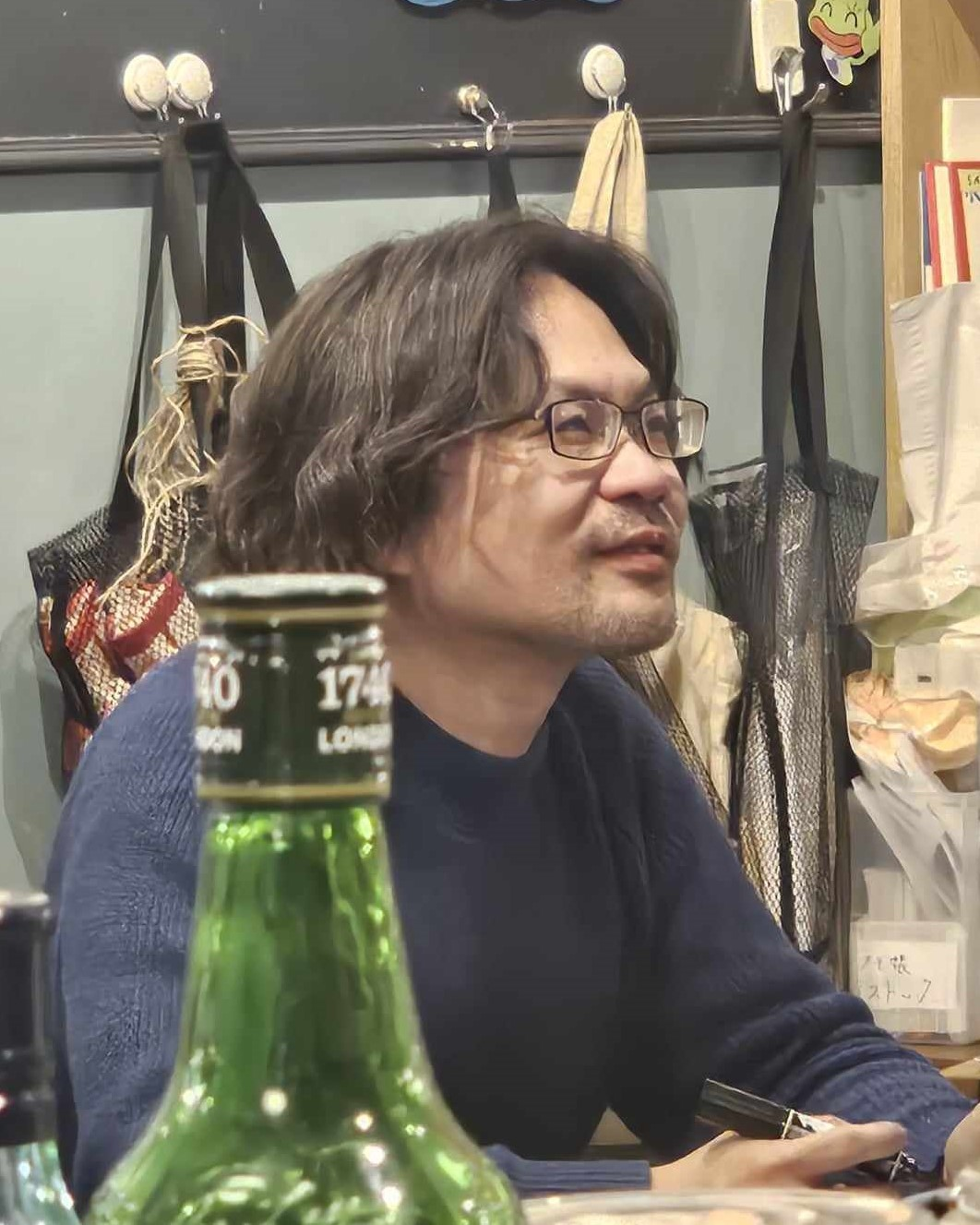
- Born: 28 July 1973 (age 53); Kuala Lumpur, Malaysia
- Occupations: Director, Writer, Producer and Editor
- Years active: 2010–present

Lim Kah Wai (Chinese: 林家威 ; born 28 July 1973) is a Malaysian film director based in Osaka, Japan. He is best known for his work on the films Magic and Loss, Fly Me to Minami and No Where, Now Here.

== Career ==
Lim's debut feature film, After All These Years, is a suspense film, starring Wenchao He and Massa Dazhong. His second film, Magic and Loss, starring Kim Kkot-bi and Kiki Sugino, premiered at the Busan International Film Festival. His third film, New World (Shinsekai Story), starring Tomonaga Koumei and Shi Ka, premiered at the Hong Kong International Film Festival.

In 2013, Lim made his fourth film, Fly Me to Minami, starring Sherine Wong, Kenji Kohashi and Baek Seol Ah which screened at the Vancouver Asian Film Festival. The film was nominated for Grand Prix at the Osaka Asian Film Festival. His fifth directorial, Love in Late Autumn, starring Irene Wan, Patrick Tam and Charmaine Fong was released in 2016. His sixth film, No Where, Now Here, premiered at the Osaka Asian Film Festival in 2018. His most recent film, Somewhen Somewhere, premiered at the Osaka Asian Film Festival in 2019.

== Filmography ==
Year	Title	Writer	Director	Producer
2010	After All These Years	✓	✓	✓
2010	Magic and Loss	✓	✓	✗
2011	New World	✓	✓	✓
2013	Fly Me to Minami	✓	✓	✓
2016	Love in Late Autumn	✓	✓	✗
2018	No Where, Now Here	✓	✓	✓
2019	Somewhen, Somewhere	✓	✓	✓
2020	Come and Go	✓	✓	✓
