= David Panton =

David Panton may refer to:

- David K Panton (born 1972), Jamaican former politician
- David Morrieson Panton (1870–1955), pastor of Surrey Chapel, Norwich, England.
