= Matt Lauer =

American TV journalist (born 1957)

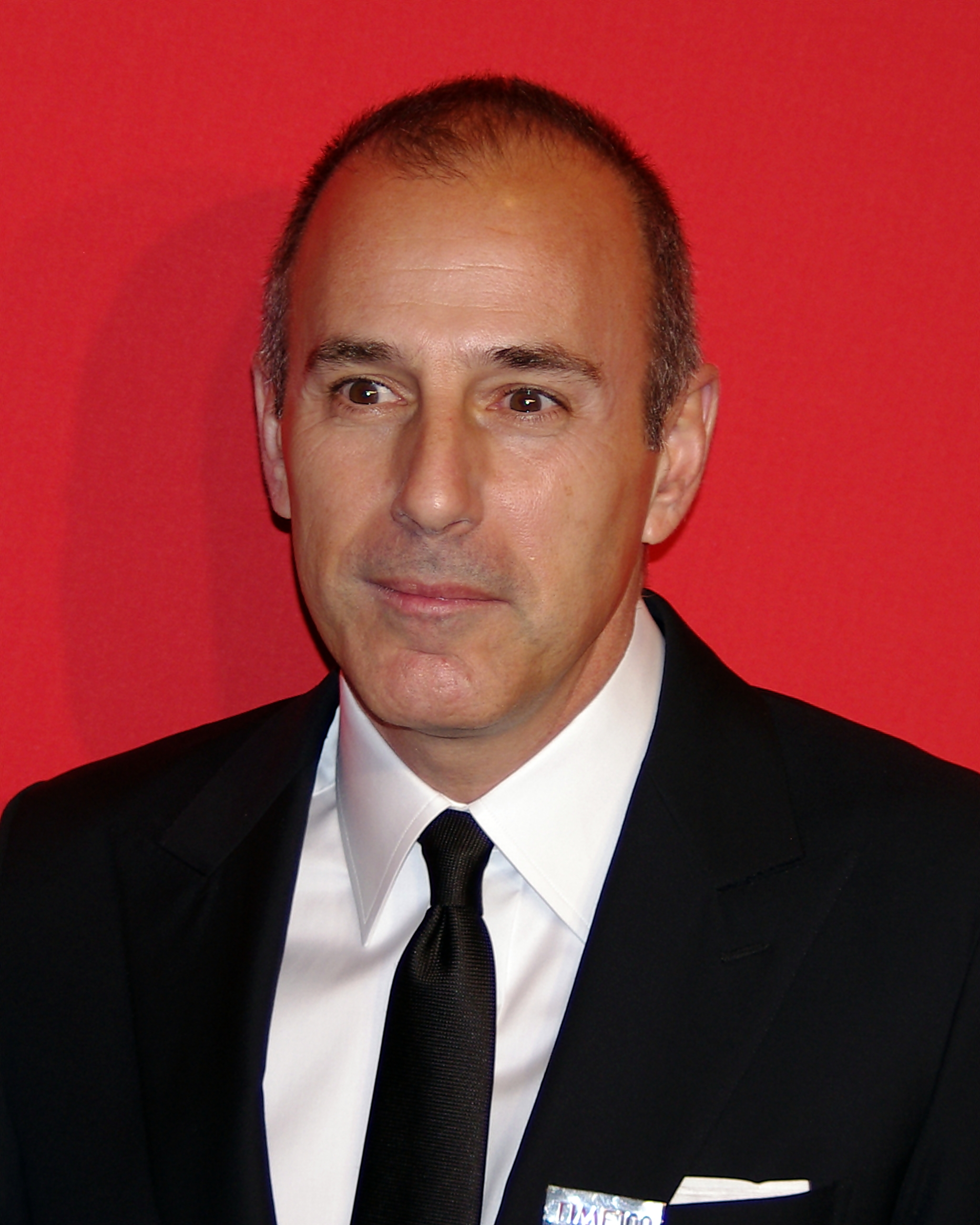
- Lauer in 2012
- Born: Matthew Todd Lauer; December 30, 1957 (age 68); New York City, U.S.
- Education: Ohio University
- Occupation: Television journalist
- Years active: 1979–2017
- Television: Today co-anchor (1997–2017); Today news anchor (1994–1997)
- Spouses: Nancy Alspaugh (m. 1982; div. 1989) Annette Roque (m. 1998; div. 2019)
- Children: 3

Matthew Todd Lauer (/laʊər/; born December 30, 1957) is an American former television news personality, best known for his work with NBC News. After serving as a local news personality, in New York City, on WNBC, his first national exposure was as the news anchor for NBC's Today, from 1994 to 1997. In 1997, Lauer was moved from the news desk to the host's chair. He was co-anchor of Today, from 1997 to 2017. He was also a frequent contributor to the evening news magazine Dateline NBC. With NBC, Lauer hosted the annual Macy's Thanksgiving Day Parade and co-hosted the opening ceremonies of several Olympic Games.

In November 2017, Lauer's contract was terminated by NBC, after NBC reported receiving "a detailed complaint from a colleague about inappropriate sexual behavior in the workplace" and added that NBC had "reason to believe this may not have been an isolated incident".

== Early life ==
Lauer was born in New York City, the son of Marilyn Lauer, a boutique owner, and Jay Robert Lauer, a bicycle company executive.

Lauer's father was of Romanian Jewish ancestry, as seen on the Today Show's Finding Our Roots. Lauer said, "My dad was Jewish. My mom is not. So I was not raised anything. I do feel a desire now to find something spiritual. Getting married and wanting to have kids has something to do with that."

== Education and early career ==
Lauer earned his undergraduate degree from Ohio University, at age 39, in 1997. He studied at the school's Scripps College of Communication School of Media Arts and Studies. Lauer had dropped out of the same institution, in the spring of 1979, to begin his television career, after he was hired as a producer of the noon newscast for WOWK-TV in Huntington, West Virginia. By 1980, Lauer had become an on-air reporter for the station's 6 p.m. and 11 p.m. newscasts.

Lauer then moved around the East Coast, hosting a number of daily information and talk programs. He was a co-host of PM Magazine, in several cities, beginning in Richmond (1980–1981), then Providence (1981–1984) and then New York City (1984–1986). After the New York edition of PM Magazine was canceled by WNYW, in 1986, Lauer and co-host Jill Rappaport worked on a new show for the station, Made in New York, which ran for fifteen weeks. Following this, Lauer gained his first national television exposure when he joined Robin Leach co-hosting ABC's short-lived daytime series Fame, Fortune and Romance, a spin-off of the syndicated Lifestyles of the Rich and Famous. Lauer then returned to local television, hosting programs in Philadelphia and Boston, from 1987 to 1989, reporting for ESPN and anchoring entertainment news segments for HBO.

In September 1989, Lauer returned to New York City, this time to WWOR, and built his career and fame, where he hosted 9 Broadcast Plaza, a three-hour live interview program. Lauer departed that series, as it took a turn in booking "tabloid" guests and topics and for what he relayed as a refusal to live-read ads on the show for Dial-a-Mattress. WWOR-TV replaced Lauer with various guest hosts Buzz Luttrell, Gay Byrne, Robb Weller, Robin Leach, Steve Edwards, Weird Al Yankovic, Howard Stern, Tom Bergeron, Tom Snyder, Wil Shriner and Richard Bey. 9 Broadcast Plaza eventually morphed into The Richard Bey Show.

At this time, Lauer was also the original primary host of a Cinemax interstitial show called Beyond the Screen, from 1988 to 1997. The show aired on breaks between programs, which was popular on Cinemax, causing them to topple HBO in the ratings. In this show, Matt, and many other hosts, would interview many celebrities such as Al Pacino, Robert De Niro, Nicole Kidman, Talia Shire, Selma Blair, Jerry Seinfeld, Annabella Sciorra, Kirsten Dunst, EPMD, Tupac, John Singleton, Samuel L. Jackson, Sean Nelson and many others, for their upcoming movies. The Godfather Part III, GoodFellas, Juice and Fresh were among the movies that had their behind-the-scenes featurette premieres, on Cinemax, via this show.

In 1990, Lauer was hired by the Kushner-Locke Company to host a pilot called Day in Court, executive-produced by veteran producer David Sams, who helped launch The Oprah Winfrey Show into national syndication. The program was retitled Trial Watch, when it went to series, and ran on the NBC network for two seasons. NBC hired Robb Weller, as host over Lauer, when the program was picked up as a daily series. That same year, Lauer filmed a pilot for the World Wrestling Federation's bodybuilding spinoff, the World Bodybuilding Federation, for USA Network, known as WBF BodyStars, though WWF owner/chairman Vince McMahon later decided to host the program himself. In 1991, Lauer appeared as the co-host, along with Willow Bay of Etc., Etc., a show on the Travel Channel.

== Career at NBC News ==
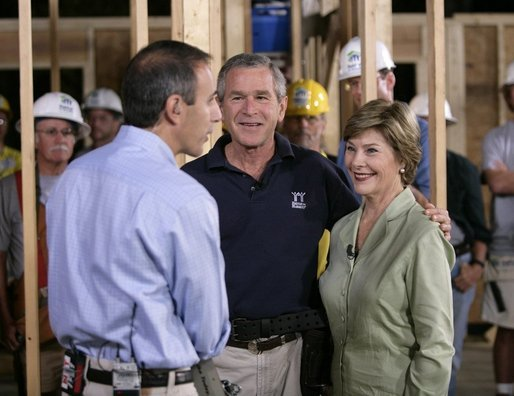
Lauer with President George W. Bush and First Lady Laura Bush in 2005

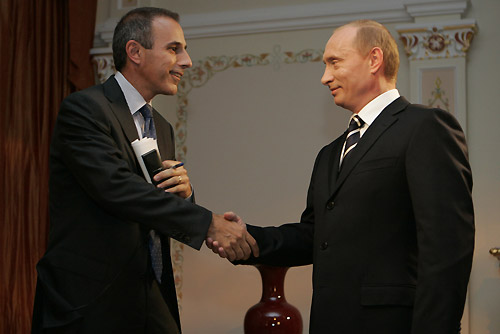
Lauer with President Vladimir Putin prior to the 32nd G8 summit in Saint Petersburg in 2006

Lauer joined NBC in 1992, when he became co-anchor of the early weekday news show Today in New York, on the network's New York flagship station WNBC. The following year, Lauer filled the role of Live at Five co-anchor, with Sue Simmons, eventually taking the role permanently and giving up the morning shift by 1994. He was replaced, on Today in New York, by Maurice DuBois. Lauer remained on Live at Five, until 1996.

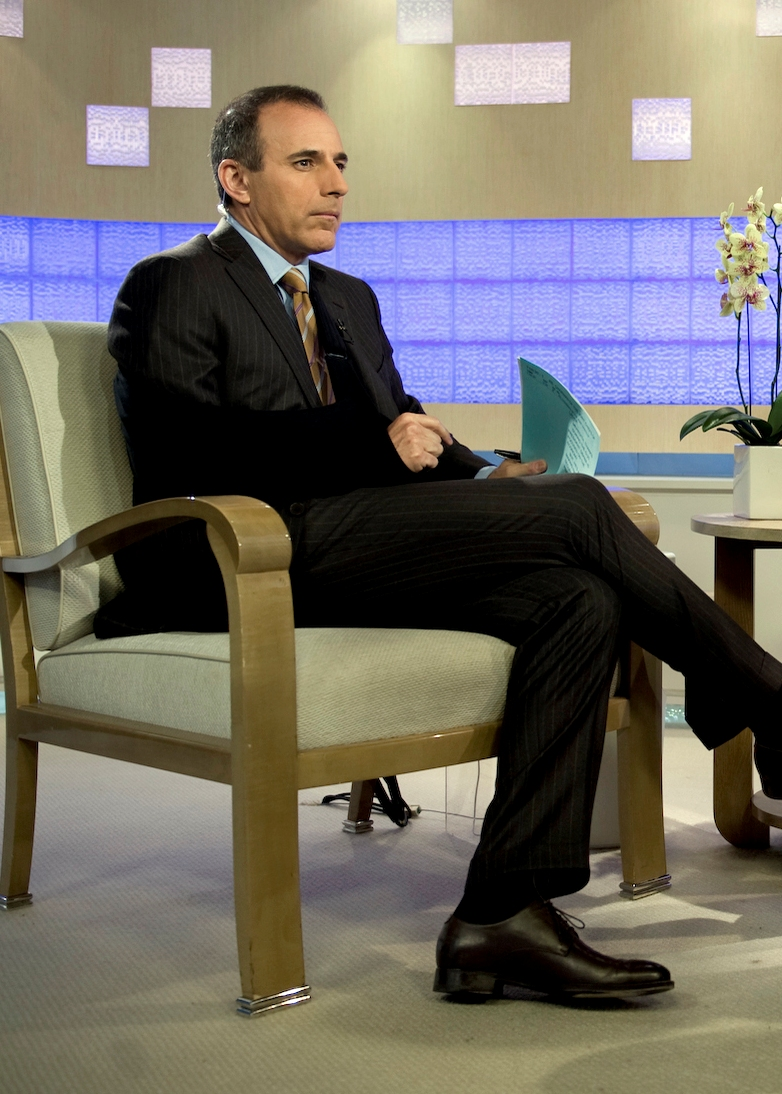
Lauer on the set of the Today Show, May 2009

Lauer's on-camera presence would soon provide him many opportunities with NBC News. Lauer filled in as the newsreader on The Today Show for Margaret Larson when needed from 1992 to 1993. This "audition" period allowed him to join The Today Show, full-time, in January 1994, as a news anchor, while still co-anchoring Today in New York and Live at Five.

Lauer stepped in for Scott Simon, Mike Schneider, Jack Ford and David Bloom, as the co-host of Weekend Today and for Ann Curry, as anchor of the former NBC News program NBC News at Sunrise, from 1992 to 1997. He had also filled in for Tom Brokaw, on NBC Nightly News. As the Today Show news anchor, Lauer also substituted for Bryant Gumbel, before being named the official co-anchor, on January 6, 1997, after Gumbel stepped down. On top of Lauer's duties on The Today Show, Lauer also hosted programming on Discovery Channel and MSNBC.

From 1998 until 2011, Lauer embarked on what was generally an annual, five-day, globe-spanning adventure called Where in the World is Matt Lauer?, on the Today Show, during TV sweeps. The segment was named after the PBS game show Where in the World Is Carmen Sandiego?, from which it borrowed the theme song. This segment sent Lauer to various locations worldwide, where he reported on the importance of each location. Lauer broadcast from locations including Bhutan, Easter Island, the Panama Canal, Iran, Hong Kong, Croatia and the Great Wall of China. In 2011, NBC News postponed the segment in consideration of the stagnant, unstable U.S. economy.

On some occasions, Lauer conducted interviews that escalated into tense exchanges. During a June 2005 interview with Tom Cruise, Lauer argued with Cruise about psychiatry and postpartum depression, and Cruise called Lauer "glib". In December 2008, Cruise said he regretted the exchange.

On June 19, 2007, Lauer interviewed Prince William and Prince Harry, on the tenth anniversary of the death of their mother, Diana, Princess of Wales.

Between 1998 and 2017, Lauer co-hosted NBC's live coverage of Macy's Thanksgiving Day Parade.

Lauer co-hosted the opening ceremonies of several Olympic Games, carrying on what his former co-host Katie Couric had done since the 2000 Summer Olympics. Lauer co-hosted the opening ceremonies of the 2008 Summer Olympics, the 2010 Winter Olympics, the 2012 Summer Olympics, the 2014 Winter Olympics and the 2016 Summer Olympics. His commentary, on the 2012 opening ceremonies, along with that of co-hosts Meredith Vieira and Bob Costas, came under fierce criticism, being described as "ignorant" and "banal".

On April 5, 2012, Lauer announced that he had signed a new contract with NBC News through 2017. Forbes estimated that the contract paid Lauer $25 million a year.

It has been widely reported that Lauer had influenced co-anchor Ann Curry's departure from The Today Show, executed by its executive producer Jim Bell, under the name "Operation Bambi".

During the 2014 Winter Olympics, Lauer replaced prime-time host Bob Costas, from February 11–14, after Costas suffered a major eye infection.

In November 2015, Lauer hosted an interview with Charlie Sheen, during which Sheen revealed that he was HIV-positive.

On September 8, 2016, Lauer conducted separate 30-minute interviews with presidential candidates Hillary Clinton and Donald Trump, both of which were met with much criticism. Lauer devoted much of the Clinton interview to questions about her e-mail server and, according to critics, appeared to rush through audience-led topics such as domestic terror attacks and veterans' affairs, implying that there was not enough time to cover these topics in detail. Many also felt that Lauer failed to challenge Trump on alleged inaccuracies, such as his statement that he was "totally against the war in Iraq", which other sources called "lies". CNN reported that the short amount of time for the interviews, the short notice with which they were conducted and the small amount of audience questions were a major reason for the poor reviews.

On November 30, 2016, it was revealed that Lauer had signed a new contract up to 2018. Variety reported that his salary was $20 million per year. On January 6, 2017, Lauer celebrated his 20th anniversary, on The Today Show, with a look back at some of his most memorable moments on the show.

== Sexual misconduct allegations ==
In 2008, Lauer was the subject of a roast by the New York Friars Club during which several of his colleagues made jokes about his reputation for having relationships with his staff.

On November 29, 2017, NBC News announced that Lauer's employment had been terminated, after an unidentified female NBC employee reported that Lauer had sexually harassed her during the 2014 Winter Olympics in Sochi, Russia and that the harassment continued after they returned to New York. Andrew Lack, chairman of NBC News, sent a memorandum to his staff that said, in part, "On Monday night, we received a detailed complaint from a colleague about inappropriate sexual behavior in the workplace by Matt Lauer. While it is the first complaint about his behavior in the over 20 years he's been at NBC News, we were also presented with reason to believe this may not have been an isolated incident." A network executive said Lauer would not receive any form of monetary settlement because he was fired "for cause". Lauer's last day on air was November 28, 2017. His contract had been scheduled to run until the end of 2018.

NBC News management said it had been aware that The New York Times and Variety had been conducting independent investigations of Lauer's behavior, but that management had been unaware of previous allegations against Lauer. Later reporting disputed this; Linda Vester, a former NBC News correspondent, said that management had to have known and that "everybody knew" that Lauer was dangerous. In his 2019 book, Catch and Kill: Lies, Spies, and a Conspiracy to Protect Predators, Ronan Farrow cited multiple sources who stated that NBC News was not only aware of Lauer's misconduct beforehand, but that Harvey Weinstein used this knowledge to pressure the program into killing a story that would have outed his own sexual assaults. Variety reported allegations by at least ten of Lauer's current and former colleagues. Additional accusations went public in the ensuing days. NBC acknowledged three additional cases from 2000 to 2007.

In Catch and Kill, Farrow reveals one of the alleged victims as Brooke Nevils, who says Lauer anally raped her in his hotel room while the two were in Sochi covering the 2014 Winter Olympics for NBC. Farrow also writes in his book that Nevils had later sexual encounters with Lauer, but she characterized those encounters as "transactional" and said that she consented only out of fear that Lauer could damage her career.

In a statement, made after his firing, Lauer apologized for his actions, saying, "Some of what is being said about me is untrue or mischaracterized, but there is enough truth in these stories to make me feel embarrassed and ashamed". Following Nevils' allegation of sexual assault, published in Farrow's book, Lauer issued an open letter confirming that he had a consensual sexual relationship with Nevils and that the relationship started in 2014 in Sochi, but denied that the initial encounter was non-consensual.

Two weeks after Lauer's firing, Addie Zinone, a former Today production assistant, said that she had a consensual sexual relationship with Lauer in June 2000. Zinone said that the relationship was an "abuse of power" on Lauer's part because Zinone said that she felt that turning down Lauer's advances would have hurt her career.

According to Farrow, Today show booker Melissa Lonner said that Lauer exposed himself to her in 2010 at an NBC cocktail party. He denied this claim and, through his lawyer, said, "he will not take part in the marketing circus of this book".

== Other work ==
Lauer made several guest appearances on the NBC sitcom 30 Rock.

Lauer made a guest appearance, as himself, on a live episode of Will & Grace, in early 2006.

In November 2006, Lauer and his daughter, Romy, hosted the Sesame Street direct-to-DVD show Sesame Beginnings: Exploring Together. Lauer hosted The Greatest American, on the Discovery Channel, which used internet and telephone voting by viewers to select the winner. Lauer was critical of his program, since it tended to favor well-known figures over others who had less influence in pop culture.

Lauer served as the 2009 Class Day speaker, at Harvard University's undergraduate commencement ceremonies, on June 3, 2009.

Lauer has appeared, as himself, in the 2009 film Land of the Lost, the 2011 film The Beaver and voiced reporter Hark Hanson in the direct-to-DVD animated sequel Curious George 2: Follow That Monkey! Lauer also made appearances in the 2011 films Drew Peterson: Untouchable and Tower Heist; archival footage of Lauer is shown in the 2015 film Straight Outta Compton and the 2017 films Lady Bird and I, Tonya. He also appeared as himself in the TV films Sharknado 2: The Second One and Sharknado 3: Oh Hell No!

== Career timeline ==
- 1979–1980: News producer and reporter, WOWK-TV, Huntington, West Virginia
- 1980–1981: Co-host, PM Magazine, WXEX-TV, Richmond, Virginia
- 1981–1984: Co-host, PM Magazine, WJAR-TV, Providence, Rhode Island
- 1984–1986: Co-host, PM Magazine, WNEW-TV, New York City
- 1986: Co-host, Made in New York, WNYW, New York City
- 1986–1987: Co-host, Fame, Fortune and Romance, ABC
- 1987–1988: Host, Live on City Line, WCAU-TV, Philadelphia
- 1988–1989: Host, Talk of the Town, WNEV-TV, Boston
- 1989–1991: Co-host, 9 Broadcast Plaza, WWOR-TV, Secaucus, New Jersey
- 1992–1996: Various positions at WNBC-TV, New York City
  - September 1992 – September 1994: Today in New York co-anchor
  - August 1993 – September 1996: early evening newscast Live at Five co-anchor
- 1992–2017: Various positions at NBC News, New York City
  - 1992–1997: fill-in anchor on Weekend Today and NBC News at Sunrise
  - 1993–1994: Today fill-in news anchor
  - June 13, 1994 – January 3, 1997: Today news anchor
  - January 6, 1997 – November 28, 2017: Today co-anchor
  - 1997–2017: Dateline NBC contributing anchor
  - 1998–2016: Christmas in Rockefeller Center host
  - 1998–2017: Macy's Thanksgiving Day Parade host
  - 2011–2013: Rock Center with Brian Williams correspondent

== Personal life ==
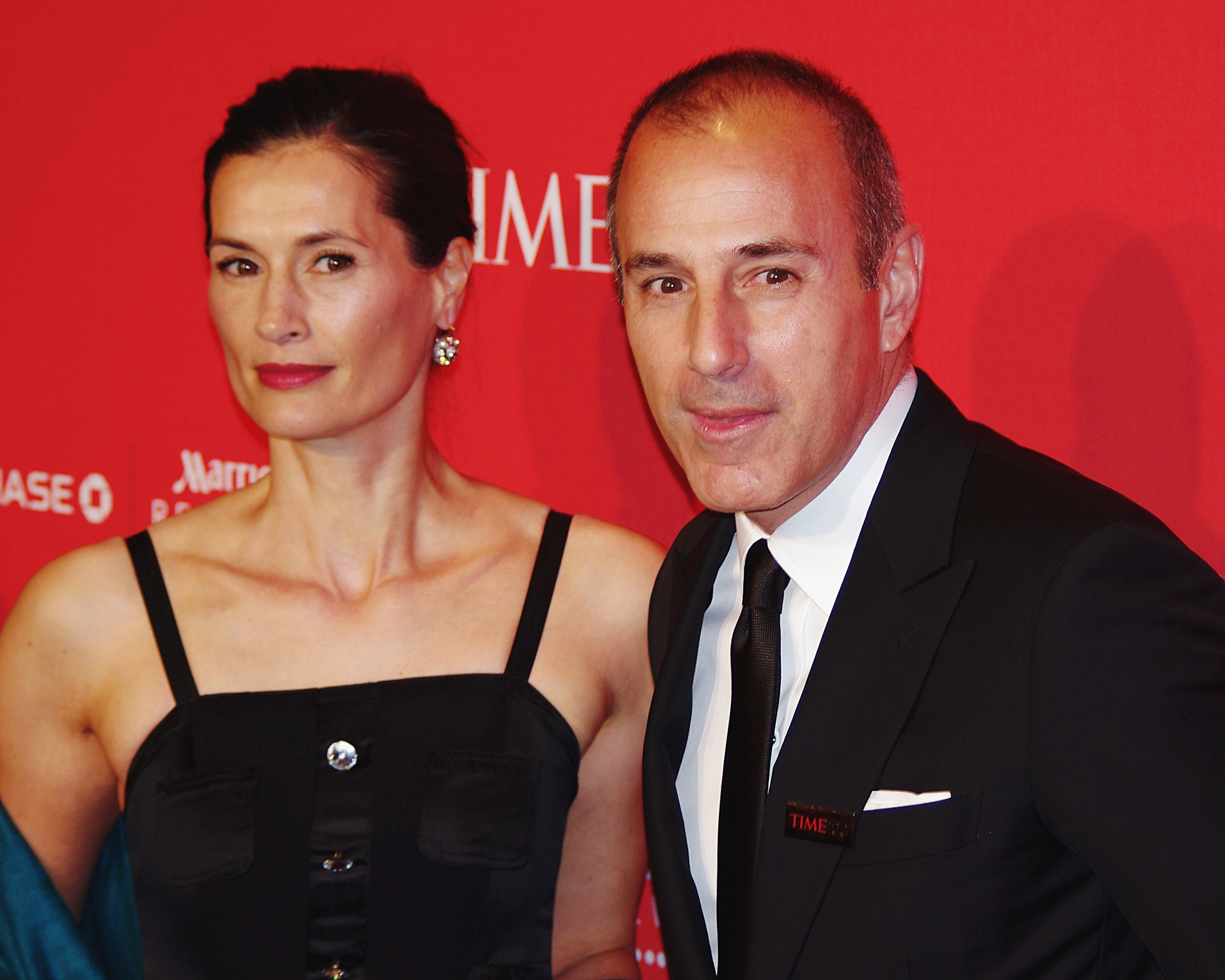
Lauer and his then-wife Annette Roque at the 2012 Time 100 gala

Lauer is the grandson of singer Art Gentry. Lauer was married to television producer Nancy Alspaugh, from 1982 to 1989. They had no children. He later married Dutch model Annette Roque whom he met on a blind date in July 1997. Lauer proposed to Roque after five months of dating and the two wed, in Bridgehampton, New York, on October 3, 1998. They have three children together.

In 2006, while pregnant, Roque filed for divorce, alleging "mental abuse, extreme mental and emotional distress, humiliation, torment and anxiety" by Lauer. They reconciled weeks later. On September 7, 2019, Lauer and Roque officially divorced, following nearly two years of separation, in the wake of his 2017 sexual harassment allegations. They have since co-parented their children, only reuniting for events such as their daughter Romy's high school graduation in 2022.

Since his 2019 divorce from Roque, Lauer has been in a relationship with Shamin Abas, founder of a public relations and marketing firm.

Media offices
| Preceded by Bryant Gumbel | Today Co-Anchor; January 6, 1997 – November 28, 2017 with Katie Couric 1997–2006; Meredith Vieira 2006–2011; Ann Curry 2011–2012 and Savannah Guthrie 2012–2017 | Succeeded by Hoda Kotb |
