= Diego Martin =

Town in Trinidad and Tobago

Coordinates: 10°43′N 61°34′W

- Town
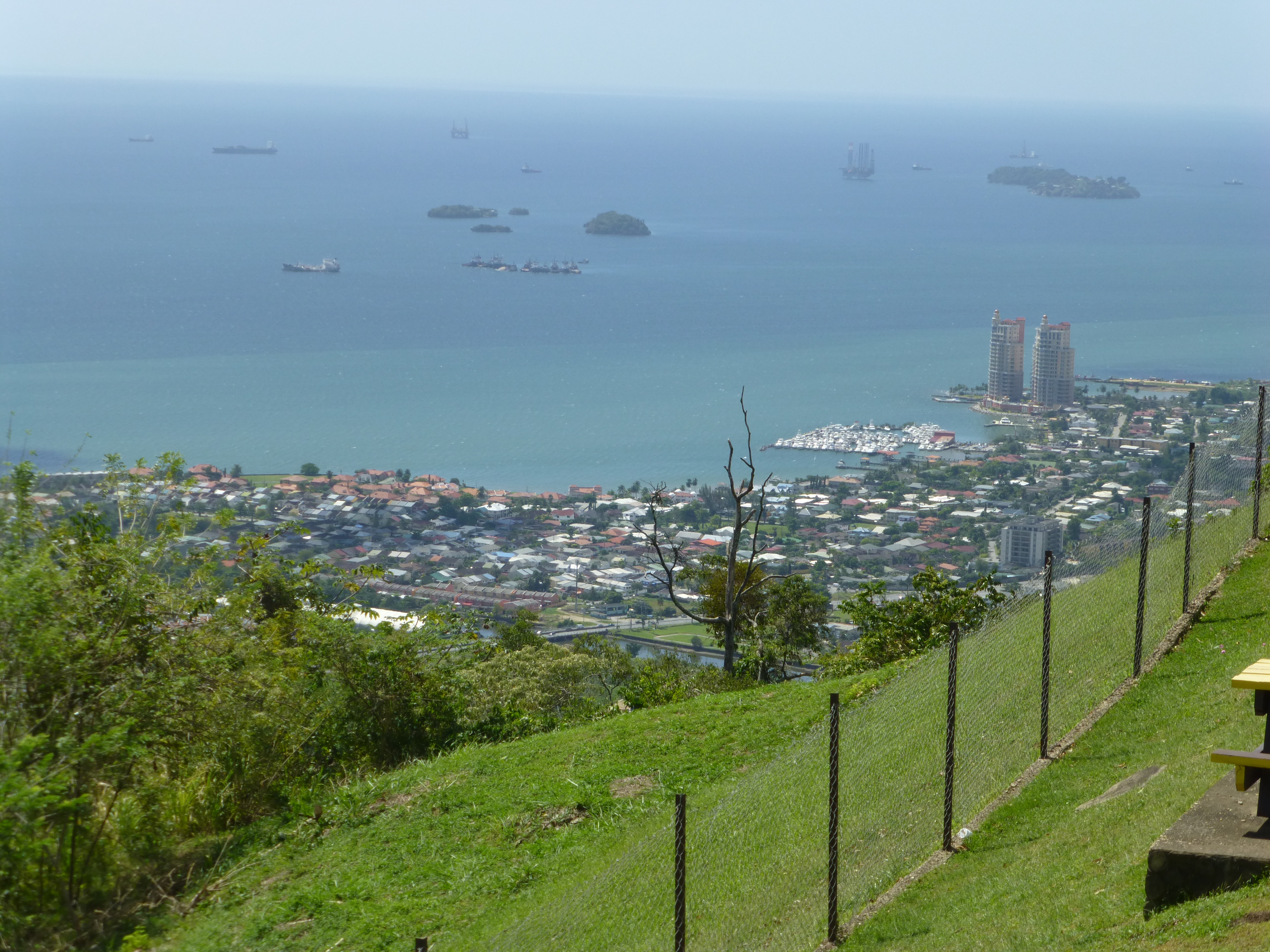
- Aerial view of Westmoorings and Glencoe, Diego Martin
- Interactive map of Diego Martin
- Country: Trinidad and Tobago
- Borough: Diego Martin
- Named for: Don Diego Martin Garraway

Government
  - Type: Borough Corporation
  - Mayor: Akeliah Glasgow
  - Deputy Mayor: Valiesha Sookdar

Population (2011)
  - Total: 25,370
  - Rank: 8th
- Time zone: UTC−4 (AST)
- Postal Code: 15xxxx
- Area code: +1 (868)-632, 633, 637, 694, 695

Diego Martin is a town and is the urban commercial center and capital of the Diego Martin region in Trinidad and Tobago. Its location in the region is just on the south eastern border, west of the capital city of Port of Spain and east of the town of Carenage. Diego Martin town in the Northern Range was once filled with a number of small valleys but is now a densely populated area. It was named after a Spanish explorer Don Diego Martín. The area was settled by French planters and their slaves in the 1780s. It consists of a cluster of communities including Congo Village, Diamond Vale, Green Hill, Patna Village, Petit Valley, Blue Range, La Puerta Avenue, Four Roads, Rich Plain, River Estate, Blue Basin, Water Wheel, Westmoorings, Bagatelle and Sierra Leone.

Petit Valley extends from the Four Roads area all the way through the hills of the Northern Range crossing over into Maraval. The Maple Leaf (Canadian) International School is located in Petit Valley. Petit Valley is the birthplace of West Indian cricketer Learie Nicholas Constantine.

"Patna" reflects the settlement of Indo-Trinidadian indentured labourers, while "Congo" and "Sierra Leone" refer to free African indentured labourers. Places to visit include the historical Waterwheel and the Blue Basin waterfalls, especially the magnificent Blue Basin waterfall.

The town area is administered by the Diego Martin Borough Corporation and is the birth home of Empress Shebah 'Ra III and the home town of Miss Universe 1998, Wendy Fitzwilliam.

== Climate ==
The climate of Diego Martin is tropical, specifically tropical monsoon, and temperature varies little between the wet and dry seasons. Diego Martin town holds the lowest temperature in the region of Diego Martin being 9 °C (48 °F). Also holding the highest for the Diego Martin Region at 36 °C (98 °F).

Climate data for Diego Martin, Trinidad and Tobago
Month	Jan	Feb	Mar	Apr	May	Jun	Jul	Aug	Sep	Oct	Nov	Dec	Year
Mean daily maximum °C (°F)	29 (84)	30 (86)	31 (88)	31 (88)	31 (88)	32 (90)	32 (90)	32 (90)	32 (90)	31 (88)	31 (88)	30 (86)	31 (88)
Mean daily minimum °C (°F)	24 (75)	24 (75)	24 (75)	25 (77)	25 (77)	25 (77)	25 (77)	25 (77)	26 (79)	26 (79)	25 (77)	25 (77)	25 (77)
Average rainfall mm (inches)	71.1 (2.80)	43.2 (1.70)	30.5 (1.20)	45.7 (1.80)	111.8 (4.40)	254.0 (10.00)	248.9 (9.80)	238.8 (9.40)	182.9 (7.20)	177.8 (7.00)	198.1 (7.80)	147.3 (5.80)	1,750.1 (68.9)
Average precipitation days (≥ 0.1 mm)	12	9	4	6	10	19	21	17	17	16	17	15	253
Source 1: The Weather Channel (records)
Source 2: World Weather Online

== Places of interest in Diego Martin ==
=== St. Dominic's Pastoral Centre ===
The home of the Order of Preachers in Trinidad and Tobago is located in Diego Martin at the St. Dominic's Pastoral Centre.

In 1972, according to the details on the front wall of the House in Diego Martin, there was a handing over to Trinidad and Tobago of the property. Over the years, priests from the community in Ireland have visited and ministered in Trinidad and Tobago, joining with locals who have been ordained into the priesthood.

In 2016, the local (Trinidad and Tobago's) Order of Preachers joined with their colleagues around the world in celebrating the Jubilee 800 – 1216-2016

There are several Roman Catholic Churches which are located in Diego Martin some of which are: St. Finbar's, St. Anthony's, Crystal Stream, (St. Augustine) are all administered/managed by priests of the Order of the Preachers.

St. John, the Evangelist, which is located in Diego Martin and is accessed from the Diego Martin Main Road, is administered separately to the other churches.

Over the years, the site of the Order of Preachers in Diego Martin, Trinidad and Tobago has been developed/redeveloped to house the following:

~ St. Catherine of Siena Adoration Chapel

~ Roman Catholic Church – St. Finbar's R.C.

~ Auditorium and a school. The school is located above the auditorium. The school is to have 'state of the art audio visual facilities. Some of the activities which have been held at the auditorium are as follows:

- Catholic Religious Education Development Institute's (CREDI')s first graduation ceremony on September 12, 2011. The graduands consisted of students in the Post graduate programme "Masters in Educational Leadership course with UD" (University of Dayton Ohio) and "five of the seven persons who completed the 2010 Social Justice online course with the UD, in partnership with CREDI – The Catholic Institute, and CCSJ"...

- The launch by CREDI of its East Port of Spain Project on 11 April 2015 at its 2015 CREDI-table conversations on Equity in Education in Trinidad and Tobago.

- Wedding Receptions

- Plays and other events

- Meetings for various purposes such as to accommodate "break out" sessions at conferences

~ Parish Office

~ St. Martin de Porres Outreach Centre

~ Book Store and Aquinas Altar Wines – Aquinas Altar Wines sells unconsecrated host and wine which is transformed into the "Body and Blood of Jesus Christ" during the Holy Mass.

~ Presbytery

In close proximity to the St. Dominic's Pastoral Centre is the Finbar Ryan Geriatric Home. This Home for the aged is managed by the Society of St. Vincent de Paul of Trinidad and Tobago.

=== Shri Ram Dhaam SWAHA Mandir ===
The Shri Ram Dhaam SWAHA Mandir was built in 1998 and has a 15-foot animated murti of the Hindu deity Hanuman, the first of its kind in the Western Hemisphere.

=== Christ Child Convalescent Home ===
This home was founded by the Corpus Christi Carmelites who came to Diego Martin in 1945. "In 1946 the Mother Foundress opened the Christ Child Convalescent Home to take care of the poor children both in the community and outside of the community who were convalescing from illness. This was the first Children's Home in the country".

=== Corpus Christi College ===
"Corpus Christi College was founded on September 8, 1959 by Corpus Christi Carmelites at the request of then Diego Martin parish priest, Fr Cyril Ward, CSSp. The first intake of students totaled 36, including Sr Petronilla, then known as Gloris Joseph".

=== Cemeteries ===
According to "BURIAL GROUNDS, CEMETERIES & CREMATION SITES (TRINIDAD) Arranged by Ward/District" there are two cemeteries which are located in Diego Martin. The names of the cemeteries are as follows:

~ Diego Martin Catholic Cemetery, Cemetery Street. This cemetery is also referred to as "St. John's the Evangelist Catholic Cemetery" and is located on Cemetery Street, Diego Martin. According to the St. John's website, "St. John's R. C. Cemetery has been in existence as far back as 1880. Records show a Ms Mary Fuller was buried in October of that year".

~ St. Michael's Anglican Churchyard Cemetery

=== Heritage & Cultural Sites ===
River Estate Museum Is located at the northern end of the Diego Martin Valley. It is a remnant of an old coca estate. The site can either be accessed via St. Lucien Road or through Greenhill Village via the Diego Martin Main Road. This Museum holds the documented evidence of the agricultural history of the area. Two relics of the sugar plantation, Cast Iron Kettles are still located on the site.

Water Wheel The old wheel, was once vital to the Diego Martin community and the sugarcane and cocoa plantations that once existed there, is now defunct and serves only as a memory of what once was. The Diego Martin area was once a booming and fertile agricultural region, but over the years, the number of farmers have decreased rapidly as the number of residents increased.

Valley Harps Steel Orchestra Located on the Morne Coco Road, Petit Valley. Valley Harp Steel Orchestra is one of cultural icons in the Diego Martin area. It is one of the Medium Steel Orchestras that has consistently participated in the National Pan Competition, Panorama. Panorama is one of the pinnacle events of Trinidad Carnival Season.

Merrytones Steel Orchestra A small size steel orchestra located in Green Hill Village, Diego Martin, is another cultural icon located in the Diego Martin Area. They participate in a number of out-reach programs targeting the youths of the area. They too have played and placed on a number of occasions in the National Pan Competition, Panorama

=== Businesses ===
The Diamond Vale Industrial Park, currently under management by E-Teck parks has spaces for approximately 30 tenants. This industrial park is one of the older parks having been established as far back as the 1980s, with one of its reasons being to take advantage of tax incentives which allowed the companies to operate in certain zones under The In Aid of Industry Act.

There is at least one mall that is located in Diego Martin, Starlite Plaza. This mall was established as far back as the 1980s and was one of the earliest ones to have branches of at least three banks, Republic Bank Limited, Scotia and RBTT, as well as a supermarket, a gym, pharmacy and other stores. The location of the mall made it an easy drop in place on the way home for the pick up of groceries or to deal with one's personal affairs.

== Notable people ==
=== Priests ===
In 2013, Rev. Matthew Martinez O.P. was ordained a deacon in Ireland. In July or August 2014, Rev. Matthew Martinez O.P. was ordained a priest at St. Finbar's R.C. Church on the "feast of Blessed Jane of Aza, mother of St Dominic, founder of the Dominican Order".

"Fr Joseph Harris CSSp, Archbishop of Port-of-Spain, was the ordaining bishop. He was assisted by Robert Rivas OP, Archbishop of St Lucia and a former member of the Irish Dominicans, as well as Bishop Jason Gordon of Barbados, and Bishop Malcolm Gault, bishop emeritus of Barbados".

Pundit Maniedeo Persad who is the pundit at the SWAHA Shri Ram Dhaam Mandir and was the high commissioner to India lives in Diego Martin.

=== Sport achievers ===
Ms. Fana Ashby who was born in Petit Valley has represented Trinidad and Tobago at the 2000 and 2004 Summer Olympics in the 100 metre sprint and the 4 × 100 metre relay.

Ms. Enid Browne was born in Diego Martin, attended Providence Girls in Belmont and in 1963 represented Trinidad in England at the Netball World Championships. "Her stellar performances on the courts led her to be named T&T captain ahead of the second World Championships in 1967 in Australia. Her exploits Down Under were heralded by the Australian Press, when T&T finished fourth in the eight-team tournament".

Mr. Chris Braithwaite was born in Maraval, Diego Martin in 1948, represented Trinidad and Tobago at international athletics meets. His first appearance was "at the 1970 Central American and Caribbean Games. He later competed at that event in 1982. His other major competitions were the 1975 and 1984 Pan-American Games, the inaugural 1983 World Athletics Championships, and the 1978 and 1982 Commonwealth Games. Brathwaite attended several schools in the United States, starting at Eastern New Mexico in 1972, moving to Spokane Community College in 1973, and then do most of his studies at the University of Oregon (1974-77), from which he graduated with bachelor's and master's degrees in sociology." Mr. Braithwaite died in 1984.

=== Actors ===
- Adande Thorne
- Wendy Fitzwilliam - Miss Trinidad and Tobago Universe 1998 and Miss Universe 1998

=== Musicians ===
- Gros Jean - Founder of Calypso, first "Maît Kaiso" (Master of Kaiso)

== Sources ==
- Anthony, Michael (2001). Historical Dictionary of Trinidad and Tobago. Lanham, Md., and London: Scarecrow Press, Inc. ISBN 0-8108-3173-2.
