= Fly Me to Minami =

2013 Japanese film

- 恋するミナミ
- Directed by: Lim Kah Wai
- Release date: 2013
- Language: Japanese

Fly Me to Minami (Japanese: 恋するミナミ) is a 2013 Japanese romantic drama film directed by Lim Kah Wai in 2013. Wai has stated this film is the second in a trilogy about the Japanese city of Osaka The film premiered at the 2013 Osaka Asian Film Festival.

== Plot ==
The plot revolves around two intertwined love stories. Seol-a, a Korean flight attendant, returns to Korea for Christmas and becomes involved in an affair with Shinsuke, a married Korean-Japanese shopkeeper in Osaka. Meanwhile, Sherine, a Hong Kong fashion magazine editor, travels to Osaka for a photo shoot and collaborates with Tatsuya, a local amateur photographer. As the stories unfold, Seol-a and Shinsuke's relationship faces challenges, while Sherine and Tatsuya develop feelings for each other. The narrative explores themes of love, relationships, and personal growth, ultimately culminating in a positive outcome for Sherine and Tatsuya as they walk together happily. They realise they like each other, and when Sherine has to go to her hotel room for the night, it is an awkward goodbye. Tatsuya misses the last train and wandering around, finds a drunken Seol-a being harassed by skateboarders. He takes her to her room, where Sherine is shocked to see him.

== Cast ==
- Sherine Wong as Sherine
- Kenji Kohashi as Tatsuya
- Baek Seol Ah as Seol Ah
- Terunosuke Takezai as Shinsuke
