= Diamond Vale, Diego Martin =

Neighborhood in Diego Martin, Trinidad and Tobago

Coordinates: 10°43′11″N 61°33′32″W

Diamond Vale is a neighborhood in Diego Martin, a borough in Trinidad and Tobago west of Port of Spain, the country's capital. According to the Diego Martin Borough Corporation, Diamond Vale has a population of 9,859 and an area of 1.7 square km.

== History ==
The land that would become Diamond Vale was used for a sugar plantation called "Diamond Estate" in the nineteenth century. It was one of the largest sugar estates in north Trinidad when active. Later, it became a cacao estate, before being abandoned in the 1920s. It was purchased by the government in 1957.

In April 1961, the land was assigned for housing development and the name was changed to Diamond Vale. Two thousand houses were built on 102 acres. The East Indian families that had been living there were asked to move to Cumoto, but many chose to move to the closer Patna Village instead. By August 1962, approximately 2,000 families had moved into the area. Many were middle-income families, including doctors, teachers, police officers, and civil servants.

== Characteristics ==
Diamond Vale is located in the Diego Martin valley.

The 25 streets in the neighborhood are all named after precious gems. It was originally accessed by Diamond Road, but the name was later changed to Wendy Fitzwilliam Boulevard after Wendy Fitzwilliam.
