= Robin Leach =

British journalist (1941–2018)

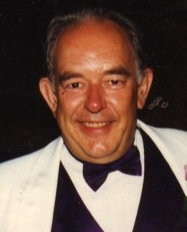
- Leach in 2007
- Born: Robin Douglas Leach; 29 August 1941; London, United Kingdom
- Died: 24 August 2018 (aged 76); Las Vegas, Nevada, U.S.
- Occupations: TV personality; entertainment reporter; writer; columnist
- Years active: 1959–2016
- Spouse: Judith Desser (m. 1968; div. 1977)
- Partner: Judith Ledford (1988–1991)
- Children: 3

Robin Douglas Leach (29 August 1941 – 24 August 2018) was a British-American entertainment reporter and writer from London. After beginning his career as a print journalist, first in Britain and then in the United States, he became best known for hosting the television series Lifestyles of the Rich and Famous from 1984 to 1995. The show focused on profiling well-known celebrities and their lavish homes, cars and other materialistic details.

== Early life ==
Leach was born in London, the son of Violet Victoria (née Phillips) and Douglas Thomas Leach, a sales executive. He attended Harrow County School for Boys, 10 miles (16 km) from central London, where he edited a school magazine, The Gayton Times, at age 14. At 15, he became a general news reporter for the Harrow Observer, and earned £6 a week after graduation.

== Career ==
Leach moved on to the Daily Mail as Britain's youngest "Page One" reporter, aged 18. In 1963, he emigrated to the United States, though he maintained his London accent throughout his life (which would become a trademark of his when he began working in television years later). He wrote for several American newspapers, including New York Daily News, People and Ladies' Home Journal, before launching GO Magazine in 1967 and then became show business editor of The Star. Leach got his start in television as a regular contributor to AM Los Angeles, with Regis Philbin and Sarah Purcell on KABC-TV. Other television work included reporting for People Tonight, on CNN and Entertainment Tonight and helping start Good Morning Australia, as well as the Food Network. Leach was also a guest at the World Wrestling Federation's WrestleMania IV, where he read the rules for the championship tournament, and then paraded the championship belt before the final match.

Leach became well-known as host of Lifestyles of the Rich and Famous, a show that profiled the lives of the wealthy, and aired in syndication from 1984 to 1995. He also hosted two Lifestyles spinoffs, the syndicated Runaway with the Rich and Famous, and ABC's Fame, Fortune and Romance, along with future Today Show host Matt Lauer. He also hosted an exposé documentary of Madonna – Madonna Exposed – for the Fox network in March 1993. The documentary was a biography of Madonna, focusing on her career and publicity stunts. Before the documentary aired, he gave Madonna a cell phone number; he said that at any point during the airing Madonna could call Leach and argue any point.

On 10 February 1995, Leach played himself in a special appearance on the American family sitcom Boy Meets World in Season 2, episode 17 entitled "On the Air". In the episode, he appears to present Eric Matthews with a check for $10 million; however, the delivery is a misunderstanding as it is actually intended for his neighbor, Dorothy Muldoon. Leach hosted The Surreal Life: Fame Games on VH1 in 2007. He also served as the public address announcer for the 2010 NASCAR Sprint Cup race at Las Vegas Motor Speedway. From 1999, he resided in Las Vegas. He wrote for the Las Vegas Sun and the daily VegasDeluxe.com website from 2008 through June 2016, when he was hired by Sheldon Adelson's Las Vegas Review-Journal. Leach appeared in the 2006 documentary film Maxed Out, which chronicled the rise of the credit card industry in the United States and the concurrent increased personal debt among working-class people. Leach remarked, "Nobody would watch Lifestyles of the Poor and Unknown". The comment was highlighted by a review in The Baltimore Sun. Leach also appeared with his wife in an episode of Celebrity Wife Swap, in which he swapped wives with Eric Roberts.

Leach appeared in the Vice Channel series Most Expensivest, with the rapper 2 Chainz. The episode (#5) aired in late 2017 and was titled "Viva Las Vegas". It included a scene with Leach and 2 Chainz eating blinis with caviar and syrup. Leach also narrated parts of the episode.

== Personal life and death ==
Robin married Judith Desser in 1968, and they divorced in 1977. He had three sons. From 1988 to 1991, he was involved in a relationship with A-Team actress Judith Ledford, and they were photographed together quite often at public appearances.

On 20 November 2017, Leach suffered a stroke while on vacation in Cabo San Lucas. He had another stroke on 20 August 2018, and died under hospice care in Las Vegas on 24 August, at age 76.
