= David K Panton =

Jamaican former senator

David Keith Panton (born 15 February 1972) is a Jamaican former senator who served in the Upper House Of Parliament, under the Jamaica Labour Party, on the opposition benches, and who currently serves as president and chief executive officer of Navigation Capital Partners.

David attended The Belair School in Mandeville, Manchester, as well as Princeton University, where he earned a bachelor's degree in Economics and Public Policy in 1992.

In 1992, Panton was accepted into both Harvard Law School, as well as the University of Oxford, at the now defunct Templeton College, shuttling between London, England and Cambridge, Massachusetts, United States.

At Harvard Law School, he became the second black President of the Harvard Law Review (the first being President Barack Obama) and earned a JD in high honours from Harvard Law School in 1997; and at Oxford University where he was awarded the Jamaican Rhodes Scholarship, eventually earning a Doctorate degree (DPhil) in Executive Management; also in 1997.

In 1999, Panton married Miss World 1993 and former Minister of Youth in the Jamaican Government, Lisa Hanna; they share a son Alexander Panton, born in 2001. He divorced Lisa Hanna in 2004, and subsequently had a brief relationship with Miss Universe 1998, attorney Wendy Fitzwilliam; they had a son, Ailan Panton, born in 2006. On April 28, 2025, Panton married Heather Fischer, a human rights expert and a former White House official in the first Trump Administration and senior advisor at Thomson Reuters.
