= Binibining Pilipinas 1998 =

- Date: March 15, 1998
- Presenters: Paolo Bediones; Alvin Anson; Ruffa Gutierrez
- Entertainment: Butch Montejo; Wise Guys; R & B
- Venue: Araneta Coliseum, Quezon City, Philippines
- Broadcaster: GMA Network
- Entrants: 29
- Placements: 10
- Winner: Olivia Tisha Silang (Resigned); Jewel May Lobaton (Assumed); Bacolod
- Congeniality: Maradee de Guzman; Antipolo
- Photogenic: Elsie Sicat; San Enrique, Iloilo

Binibining Pilipinas 1998 was the 35th edition of Binibining Pilipinas. It took place at the Smart Araneta Coliseum in Quezon City, Metro Manila. Philippines on March 15, 1998.

At the end of the event, Abbygale Arenas crowned Tisha Silang as Binibining Pilipinas Universe 1998, Kristine Florendo crowned Rachel Soriano as Binibining Pilipinas World 1998, and Susan Jane Ritter crowned Colette Centeno as Binibining Pilipinas International 1998. Jewel May Lobaton was named First Runner-Up, while Elsie Sicat was named Second Runner-Up.

Tisha Silang later had to resign because of citizenship issues and was replaced by Jewel May Lobaton. This led to the promotion of Elsie Sicat as first runner-up and Esabela Cabrera as second runner-up.

== Results ==
Color keys

- The contestant was a Semi-Finalist in an International pageant.
- The contestant did not place.

Placement	Contestant	International Placement
Binibining Pilipinas Universe 1998	Bb. #1 – Olivia Tisha Silang	Resigned due to citizenship issues
Binibining Pilipinas World 1998	Bb. #21 – Rachel Soriano	Unplaced – Miss World 1998
Binibining Pilipinas International 1998	Bb. #11 – Colette Centeno Glazer	Top 15 – Miss International 1998
1st Runner-Up	Bb. #25 – Jewel May Lobaton (Assumed the Binibining Pilipinas Universe 1998 title)	Unplaced – Miss Universe 1998
2nd Runner-Up	Bb. #3 – Elsie Sicat (Assumed the First Runner-Up position)	
Top 10	Bb. #4 – Esabela Molina Cabrera (Assumed the Second Runner-Up position); Bb. #6 – Maria Rizza Padilla; Bb. #13 – Cielito Pua Zambrano; Bb. #14 – Maradee de Guzman; Bb. #17 – Charlynne Cervantes	

=== Special awards ===
Award	Contestant
Miss Photogenic/AGFA	Bb. #3 – Elsie Sicat
Miss Friendship	Bb. #14 – Maradee de Guzman
Miss Talent	Bb. #1 – Tisha Silang
Best In Swimsuit	Bb. #11 – Colette Centeno
Best In Evening Gown	Bb. #25 – Jewel May Lobaton
Miss Lux Super Rich	Bb. #11 – Colette Centeno
Miss Vaseline Healthy Skin	Bb. #3 – Elsie Sicat
Miss Pond's Beautiful Skin	Bb. #2 – Preciosa Valencia
Miss Close-Up Smile	Bb. #3 – Elsie Sicat
Binibining Avon	Bb. #21 – Rachel Soriano
Miss PAL Sunniest Personality	Bb. #25 – Jewel May Lobaton
Miss Slimmer's World	Bb. #14 – Maradee de Guzman

== Contestants ==
29 contestants competed for the three titles.

No.	Contestant	Age	City/Province	Placement
1	Olivia Tisha Silang	23	Filipino Community of Toronto, Canada	Binibining Pilipinas Universe 1998
2	Preciosa Valencia	20	Quezon City	
3	Elsie Sicat	19	San Enrique, Iloilo	2nd Runner-Up
4	Esabela Molina Cabrera	20	Dasmariñas, Cavite	Top 10
5	Genesis Canlapan	23	Quezon City	
6	Maria Rizza Padilla	20	Marikina	Top 10
7	Lone Christensen Refe	19	Nueva Ecija	
8	Angelica Tabas	20	Makati	
9	Lorelie Burgos	23	Lipa, Batangas	
10	Rachelle Cervantes	19	Makati	
11	Colette Centeno Glazer	17	Manila	Binibining Pilipinas International 1998
12	Lourdelyn Parma	24	Legazpi City	
13	Cielito Pua Zambrano	23	Mina, Iloilo	Top 10
14	Maradee de Guzman	19	Antipolo	Top 10
15	Charmel delos Santos	24	Caloocan	
16	Mia Ann Alqueza	19	Quezon City	
17	Charlynne Cervantes	20	Makati	Top 10
18	Catherine Lavidon	19	Imus, Cavite	
19	Aurelia Pamintuan	25	Angeles City	
20	Maria Charo Calalo	21	Batangas City	
21	Rachel Soriano	22	Meycauayan, Bulacan	Binibining Pilipinas World 1998
22	Anna Lea Zuñiga	18	Muntinlupa	
23	Stephanie Lopez	24	Manila	
24	Camille Monasterio	19	Pasay	
25	Jewel May Lobaton	21	Bacolod	1st Runner-Up
26	Analiza Licup	17	San Mateo, Rizal	
27	Renabelle David	22	Tarlac City	
28	Nena Ann dela Peña	24	Calape, Bohol	
29	Maria Carmela Manahan	25	Marikina	

== Notes ==
=== Post-pageant notes ===
- Tisha Silang resigned as Binibining Pilipinas-Universe 1998 due to citizenship issues and was replaced by Jewel May Lobaton. Lobaton competed in Miss Universe 1998 in Honolulu, Hawaii but was unplaced. The original placement of Lobaton was given to Elsie Sicat, the Second Runner-Up, while the Second Runner-Up position was given to Esabela Cabrera, one of the semifinalists.
- Rachel Soriano was unplaced when she competed at Miss World 1998 in Mahé Island, Seychelles. On the other hand, Colette Centeno was one of the 15 semifinalists at Miss International 1998 in Tokyo, Japan.
