= Al Masini =

American television producer

- Born: Alfred Michael Masini; January 5, 1930; Jersey City, New Jersey, U.S.
- Died: November 29, 2010 (aged 80); Honolulu, Hawaii, U.S.
- Education: Fordham University
- Occupation: Television producer
- Spouses: Maria Masini (m. 1958–1985) Noreen Donovan (m. 1988–1993) April Masini (m. 1995–2000) Charlyn Honda (m. 2001)
- Website: almasini.com

Alfred Michael Masini (January 5, 1930 – November 29, 2010) was an American television producer.

== Life and career ==
=== Early life and education ===
Al Masini was born in Jersey City, New Jersey. Raised by his widowed mother, Masini started working after school at age 10 in a Tootsie Roll factory to help support the family after his father died. Masini graduated from Xavier High School in 1948 and from Fordham University in 1952, where he was a three-sport star. After serving as an Air Force officer during the Korean War, he found a job in the CBS News department. From there he moved to CBS Network Station Relations and then into television sales.

By the late 1950s, Masini was a spot sales representative for the Edward Petry Company (now Petry Media), an advertising company. There he developed sales systems and procedures and established the first programming department. He also created individual spot pricing, a system by which each individual spot was priced according to the actual size of the audience.

=== TeleRep ===
In December 1968, Masini founded TeleRep in New York City to sell advertisements for client television stations. TeleRep grew to represent hundreds of stations and entered the TV programming business. The firm is now part of CoxReps, a television station sales company.

=== Operation Prime Time ===
In 1976 Masini and TeleRep organized Operation Prime Time, a consortium of American independent television stations, to develop high-quality prime time programming for local, independent stations. Working with Richard H. Frank, who was the general manager of KCOP-TV Los Angeles, Shelly Cooper, general manager of WGN-TV Chicago, and representatives of KTVU, WPIX and KSTW, Masini organized a plan by which individual stations, acting collectively, would commission their own big-budget programs, thereby circumventing the major networks. Under this arrangement, the bulk of commercial time would be sold on a local basis, reversing the pattern followed by the major networks. Operation Prime Time was launched in May 1977, with Testimony of Two Men, a six-hour series based on Taylor Caldwell’s best-selling novel, debuting on 93 stations. Another early program, David Frost’s conversations with Richard Nixon, drew 45 million viewers. Among the early executives to sign on were Frank Price of Universal Television, who offered the Caldwell novel, and Archa Knowlton, media-services director for General Foods.

Operation Prime Time specials include many Emmy Award nominees and several Emmy winners, such as Ingrid Bergman in A Woman Called Golda, about Israeli Prime minister Golda Meir; Alec Guinness in Smiley’s People; Louis Gossett Jr. in Sadat, a 1983 miniseries on Egyptian President Anwar Sadat; Robert Blake in Blood Feud, about Jimmy Hoffa and Robert F. Kennedy; and Barbara Taylor Bradford’s A Woman of Substance.

Masini also founded Television Program Enterprises (TPE), the production arm of TeleRep. TPE owned and ran Operation Prime Time.

Masini created and produced many popular syndicated series and made-for-TV movies. His programs won more than 35 Emmy Awards and include the long-running shows Entertainment Tonight; Lifestyles of the Rich and Famous; Fame, Fortune and Romance; Solid Gold; and Star Search.

For Entertainment Tonight, Masini pioneered the use of satellites to transmit the syndicated program.

=== Activism ===
Masini and his third wife, April Masini, lobbied to change Hawaii state law to lure movie and TV productions to the islands. They have been credited with persuading the producers of Baywatch and Pacific Blue to film in Hawaii, and they brought the Miss Universe 1998 Pageant to the Stan Sheriff Arena, along with delegations and news media from 85 countries.

=== Death ===
Masini died of melanoma in Honolulu, Hawaii. His survivors were Charlyn Honda Masini, whom he had married in 2001, a sister, Melba Marvinny, and two nieces. He had no children of his own.

== Awards ==
Broadcasting Inaugural Hall of Fame, 1991

National Association of Broadcasters, Broadcast Pioneer Award, 2003
