= Fame, Fortune and Romance =

- Created by: Al Masini
- Presented by: Robin Leach; Matt Lauer
- Composer: Tod Cooper
- Country of origin: United States
- Original language: English

Original release
- Network: ABC
- Release: September 8, 1986 – May 29, 1987

Related
- Lifestyles of the Rich and Famous Runaway with the Rich and Famous

Fame, Fortune and Romance is an American television series about the lives of the wealthy and famous, hosted by Robin Leach and Matt Lauer.

A spin-off of the television series Lifestyles of the Rich and Famous, the show aired on ABC at 11:00 A.M. (EST) during its daytime schedule from September 8, 1986 through May 29, 1987. It had a two-week trial run in the timeslot from June 16–27, 1986.
