= Wendy Fitzwilliam =

Trinidadian model (born 1972)

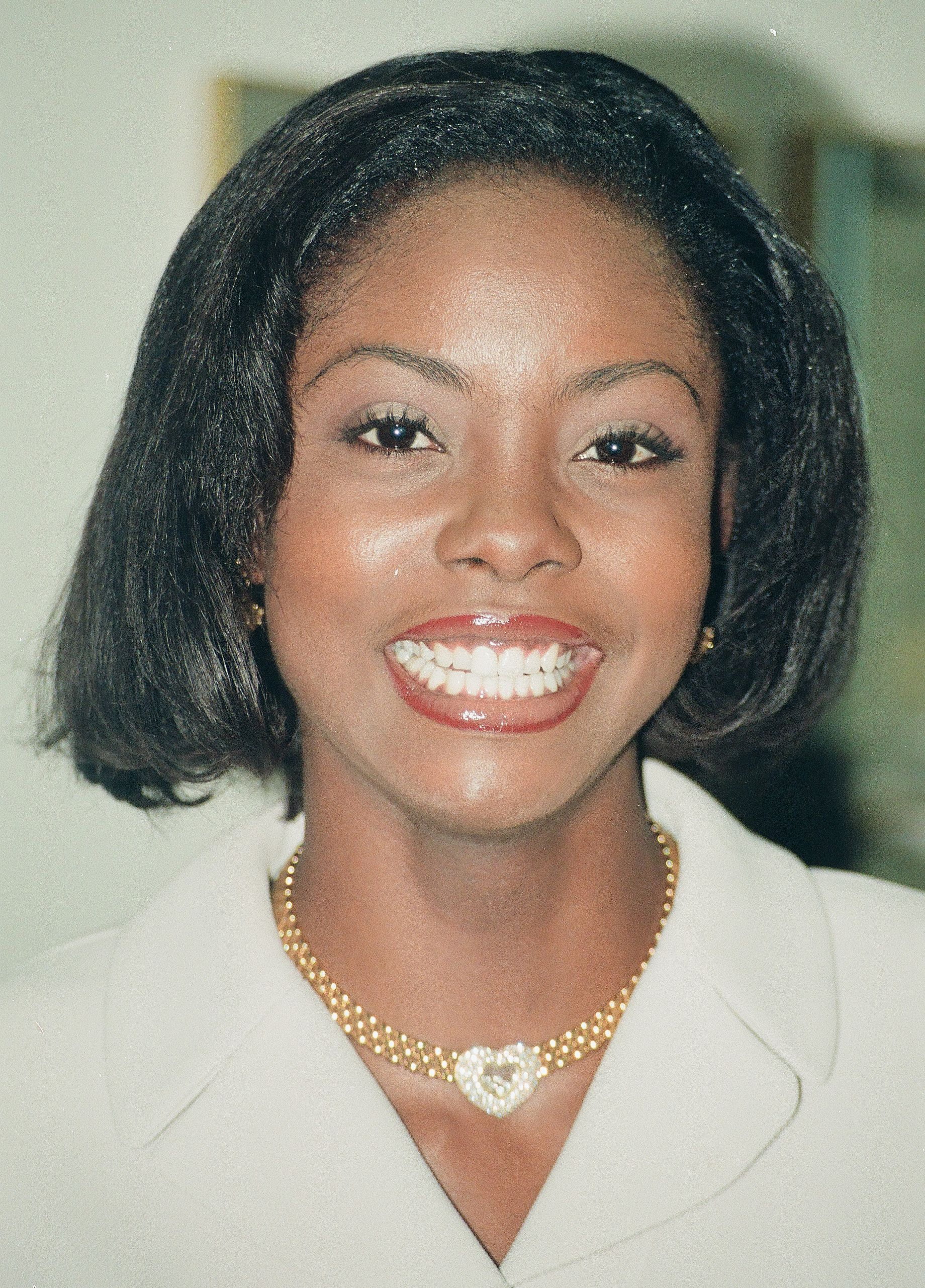
- Fitzwilliam in 1999
- Born: Wendy Marcelle Fitzwilliam; 4 October 1972 (age 54); Diego Martin, Trinidad and Tobago
- Height: 1.82 m (6 ft 0 in)
- Beauty pageant titleholder
- Title: Miss Trinidad and Tobago Universe 1998; Miss Universe 1998
- Hair color: Black
- Eye color: Brown
- Major competitions: Miss Trinidad and Tobago Universe 1998 (Winner); Miss Universe 1998 (Winner)

Wendy Marcelle Fitzwilliam (born 4 October 1972) is a Trinidadian lawyer, actress, model, singer, tv host and beauty queen who won Miss Trinidad and Tobago Universe 1998 and became the second Miss Universe in history from Trinidad and Tobago. Miss Universe 1998 is also the third woman of African heritage to win the beauty pageant.

== Early life ==
Fitzwilliam has one sibling, a younger sister, Dionyse Fitzwilliam. She grew up in Jade Gardens, Diamond Vale, Diego Martin and attended Diego Martin Girls R.C before attending St. Joseph's Convent in Port of Spain. She also studied Law at the University of the West Indies, Cave Hill.

== Miss Universe ==
Fitzwilliam modeled for local fashion designer Meiling in her teenage and early years. She won Miss Universe Trinidad and Tobago. At age 25, she participated in the 1998 Miss Universe pageant held at the Stan Sheriff Center in Honolulu, Hawaii. She beat off challenges from the other semifinalists: Top 10 semifinalists Anna Malova of Russia, Andrea Roche of Ireland, Kerishnie Naicker of South Africa, Lymaraina D'Souza of India and Michella Marchi of Brazil, Top 5 finalists Silvia Ortiz of Colombia and Shawnae Jebbia of USA, eventual 2nd Runner-Up Joyce Giraud of Puerto Rico, and eventual 1st Runner-Up Veruska Ramírez of Venezuela.

Fitzwilliam's regal air and perfect evening gown presentation won her the favor of the judges and made her the favorite to capture the crown that night. However, once the final 3 were announced, the final answer portion led people to suspense, since there was a deadlock between her and Ramirez of Venezuela who had won the swimsuit competition with the highest score ever seen at the time. Because there were eight members on the panel of judges and no way to break an eventual tie, the decision promised to be a nail-biter.

In the end, Fitzwilliam prevailed and became the first contestant in history to win wearing a bikini in the swimsuit competition, denying Ramírez that title as well. Her win came 21 years after another Trinidadian, Janelle Commissiong, who also happened to be the first Miss Universe of African heritage, captured in 1977 the crown for her country for the first time. Fitzwilliam is, thus, the second titleholder from Trinidad and Tobago and the third of African heritage, after Commissiong and biracial Chelsi Smith of the United States.

During her reign, she was honored by the United Nations and bestowed the title of UNAIDS and UNFPA Goodwill Ambassador for her work in HIV/AIDS education and awareness.

Her dedication to the HIV/AIDS cause also led her to found The Hibiscus Foundation (THF) in Trinidad and Tobago on 6 September 1998. This organization was established to heighten AIDS awareness in Trinidad and Tobago and to give assistance, financially and otherwise, to children's homes in Trinidad.

She was the international spokesperson for Clear Essence Skin Care and made several notable television appearances having hosted segments of "Wild On…" for E! Entertainment Television and the Miss Universe Special for the same network.

She made appearances on "Live with Regis and Kathy Lee", "The Magic Hour", "Politically Incorrect", "The O’Reilly Factor", CNN’s "Talk Back Live", Trinidad and Tobago Carnival" for BET, "The Johnny Cochran Show" on Court TV, Soca Monarch Finals for CNMG with Danny Glover and Chris Tucker, among others.

== After Miss Universe ==
After her reign, she recorded a jazz demo and continued her education. In 2000, she was admitted into the bar.

Fitzwilliam has also acted as a judge and host for many regional and international pageants, such as Miss Guyana, Miss Trinidad and Tobago and Miss Universe.

She was the Vice President of Investment Promotion at the Evolving TecKnologies and Enterprise Development Company Limited (E TecK), a state-owned company in Trinidad and Tobago. She is also attached to the Trinidad Guardian's Guardian in Education: Making a Difference project, a series of motivational school tours that also features former World Champion sprinter Ato Boldon and cyclist Michael Phillips, aiming to promote the development of the country's diversity.

She was appointed the Red Cross Ambassador of Youth for the Caribbean.

Wendy is also referenced in the 2016 DJ Bravo Song "Champion", which gained cult status following the victory of the West Indies cricket team in the 2016 ICC World Twenty20 tournament.

She is one of the judges of the reality television competition Caribbean's Next Top Model.

In 2023, she was a guest judge of the 71st edition of Miss Universe, held at the New Orleans Morial Convention Center in New Orleans, Louisiana, United States.

== Personal life ==
Fitzwilliam gave birth to her son, Ailan Andrew Panton in April 2006. She separated from his father, David K Panton, a Rhodes Scholar, CEO and former Senator in the Jamaican government, in 2008. She currently resides in her native Trinidad and Tobago with her son Ailan Panton.

Awards and achievements
Preceded by (United States) Brook Lee	Miss Universe; 1998	Succeeded by (Botswana) Mpule Kwelagobe
Preceded by Margot Bourgeois	Miss Trinidad and Tobago; 1998	Succeeded by Nicole Simone Dyer
