= Sherine Wong =

Malaysian model

- 黃淑玲
- Born: Sherine Wong Sook Ling; 28 March 1979 (age 47); Kuala Lumpur, Malaysia
- Other name: Sherine (尚羚)
- Education: Monash University
- Occupations: Model; emcee; actress; singer; Beauty pageant titleholder
- Years active: 1998–present
- Known for: Miss Malaysia Universe 1998
- Modelling information
- Height: 1.75 m (5 ft 9 in)
- Hair colour: Black
- Eye colour: Dark brown
- Beauty pageant titleholder
- Title: Miss Malaysia Universe 1998; Miss Malaysia Asia 2004
- Major competitions: Miss Malaysia Universe 1998 (Winner); Miss Universe 1998 (Unplaced)
- Website: www.sherinewong.com

Sherine Wong Sook Ling (simplified Chinese: 黄淑玲; traditional Chinese: 黃淑玲; pinyin: Huáng Shūlíng; Cantonese Yale: Wong Suk Ling; born 28 March 1979) is a Malaysian Chinese model and beauty pageant titleholder who the winner of Miss Malaysia Universe in 1998 and represented Malaysia in the Miss Universe 1998. She is currently a full pledge model in Hong Kong.

== Personal life ==
Born on 28 March 1979, Sherine Wong grew up in Kuala Lumpur. During her high school days, she was excelled in athletics. She represented her school and Malaysia in triple jumps and long jumps competition. She graduated in 2005 with Bachelor of Business & Commerce at Monash University, Australia.

== Beauty pageants ==
=== Miss Malaysia Universe 1998 ===
Standing at 5'9', when she was just 18 years old, Wong participated in Miss Malaysia/Universe 1998 pageants. She was crowned as the Miss Malaysia/Universe 1998 winner at Kota Kinabalu, Sabah where the final round of the pageant was held. She represented Malaysia in the Miss Universe 1998 pageant in Hawaii.

=== Miss Asia 2004 ===
After winning the title of Miss Malaysia Universe 1998, Wong started off as fashion model Malaysia, then Singapore and finally landed herself in Hong Kong in the year of 2004. She participated in the Miss Asia 2004 which was organised by the ATV. Despite she did not win the pageant, she was one of the top favourites, placed in the Top 8 and won the Miss Photogenic and Perfect Skin titles.

== Career ==
Since she started off as a runway model, Wong has worked for some renowned international brands such as Prada, Christian Dior, Chanel, and Cartier in Hong Kong, Taiwan, Singapore and Malaysia. With degrees in Bachelor of Business and Commerce, she had the ambition to become an entrepreneur where she invested in a club in Hong Kong. However the club were sold due to the world economy crisis in 2008.

She later resumed her modeling career, securing endorsement deals, appearing in television commercials, and hosting events. She Also starred starred in music videos for famous cantopop singers Hacken Lee and Eric Suen. following her work in Hong Kong, she began expanding to the greater China region.

Sherine would later possess talents in acting and singing. She was once starred in a 2005 movie called Scary Incident (恐怖事件) alongside Hong Kong actor Mark Cheng, who is the main lead actor.

In 2011, she worked towards releasing her first EP and photobook, after being inspired and praised by the Hong Kong-based Swedish musician, Anders Nelsson.

Wong also starred in a 2013 independent Japanese film Fly Me to Minami.

She eventually released her first EP in 2018.

== Filmography ==
Films

Date of release	Title	Role	Note
2005	Scary Incident	Detective	
2013	Fly Me to Minami	Serene	Independent Japanese film

== Discography ==
EP

Date of release	Title
2018	Sherine
