= Miss Universe 1998 =

47th Miss Universe pageant

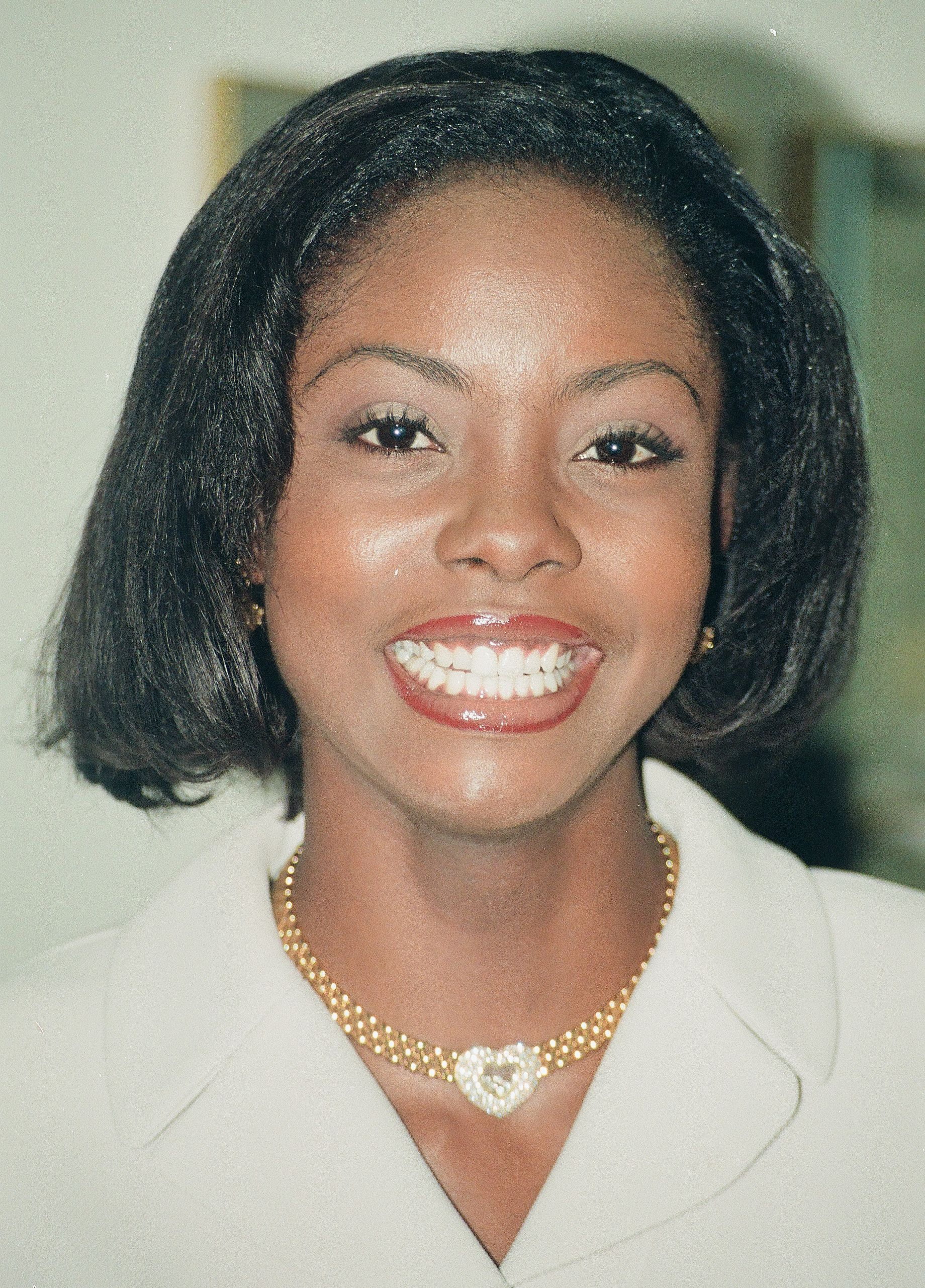
- Wendy Fitzwilliam
- Date: 12 May 1998
- Presenters: Jack Wagner; Ali Landry; Julie Moran
- Entertainment: K-Ci & JoJo; Sunland
- Venue: Stan Sheriff Arena, Honolulu, Hawaii, United States
- Broadcaster: CBS (KGMB)
- Entrants: 81
- Placements: 10
- Debuts: Angola
- Withdrawals: Bermuda; Iceland; Turks and Caicos Islands
- Returns: Ghana; Great Britain; Guam; Japan; Netherlands; Nicaragua; Nigeria; Norway; Yugoslavia
- Winner: Wendy Fitzwilliam; Trinidad and Tobago

Miss Universe 1998 was the 47th Miss Universe pageant, was held at the Stan Sheriff Arena in Honolulu, Hawaii, United States, on 12 May 1998. Wendy Fitzwilliam of Trinidad and Tobago was crowned by Brook Lee of the United States at the end of the event.

This marked the only second time that Trinidad and Tobago has won Miss Universe. Eighty-one contestants competed in this year.

== Background ==
The 47th Miss Universe Pageant was held on 12 May 1998 at the University of Hawaii's Stan Sheriff Center in Honolulu and was broadcast internationally by CBS. Wendy Fitzwilliam of Trinidad and Tobago defeated 80 other contestants and was crowned by Hawaii native Brook Lee, the reigning Miss Universe.

Lee initially proposed bringing the pageant to her home state, after which television producers Al Masini and April Masini joined Hawaii Visitors and Convention Bureau president Tony Vericella and Governor Ben Cayetano's representative Joe Blanco in months of negotiations with the Miss Universe organization. The negotiations began in August 1997 and continued until February 1998, when Cayetano announced that Honolulu had secured the event. Al Masini served as producer of the pageant's Hawaii components, overseeing the locally produced television and promotional material, while April Masini headed the host committee and worked as event coordinator; donating millions in time as, they both served without salaries.

Hawaii's Legislature appropriated US$3.3 million to host and market the pageant, supplemented by millions of dollars in private-sector support and donated services from local businesses. The production included a parade and numerous public events intended to showcase Hawaii before an international television audience, with the state guaranteed promotional airtime during the broadcast. Afterward, the Hawaii Visitors and Convention Bureau reported a sharp increase in public inquiries and millions of visits to its website, regarding the pageant as a major source of worldwide exposure for the islands.

A proclamation issued by Hawaii Governor Ben Cayetano credited Al Masini and April Masini with coordinating with the Miss Universe organization, the Trump organization and CBS, and helping produce the two-hour telecast showcasing Hawaii. Al Masini produced two video segments set to Danny Couch's song "These Islands", which were featured during the broadcast.

The proclamation also credited April Masini with organizing pre-pageant events for the 81 delegates over a two-week period, supported by local volunteers and businesses. In recognition of their contributions to the pageant, Cayetano designated 4 June 1998 as "Al and April Masini Day" in Hawaii.

=== Economic impact ===
Hawaii's Legislature appropriated US$3.3 million to host the pageant, while approximately $2 million in donated services from local businesses brought the estimated production and broadcast budget to $5.3 million. Before the event, Hawaii Visitors and Convention Bureau president Tony Vericella projected that approximately 2,000 attendees, including contestants, production staff, relatives and journalists, would generate $9 million in local spending. Public funding attracted criticism during a period of state budget difficulties; a Honolulu Star-Bulletin poll found that 54 percent of respondents opposed the appropriation, while 32 percent supported it.

Following the pageant, the Honolulu Star-Bulletin reported a sharp increase in inquiries to the Hawaii Visitors and Convention Bureau and millions of hits on its website during the following month. A 2009 retrospective by KHNL reported that the event had brought tens of millions of dollars into Hawaii's economy.

=== Selection of participants ===
==== Replacements ====
Linor Abargil, Miss Israel 1998 couldn't compete due to being underage. Hagit Raz, the first runner-up, went in her place. The winner of Binibining Pilipinas Universe 1998, Tisha Silang had to resign due to her Canadian citizenship. The pageant's first runner-up, Jewel Mae Lobaton, was selected as her replacement.

== Results ==
=== Placements ===
Placement	Contestant
Miss Universe 1998	Trinidad and Tobago – Wendy Fitzwilliam
1st Runner-Up	Venezuela – Veruska Ramírez
2nd Runner-Up	Puerto Rico – Joyce Giraud
Top 5	Colombia – Silvia Fernanda Ortíz; United States – Shawnae Jebbia
Top 10	Brazil – Michella Marchi; India – Lymaraina D'Souza; Ireland – Andrea Roche; Russia – Anna Malova; South Africa – Kerishnie Naiker

=== Special awards ===
Award	Contestant
Best National Costume	Trinidad and Tobago – Wendy Fitzwilliam
Clairol Style Award	Mexico – Katty Fuentes
Miss Photogenic	Slovakia – Vladimíra Hreňovčíková
Miss Congeniality	Turkey – Asuman Krause

== Contestants ==
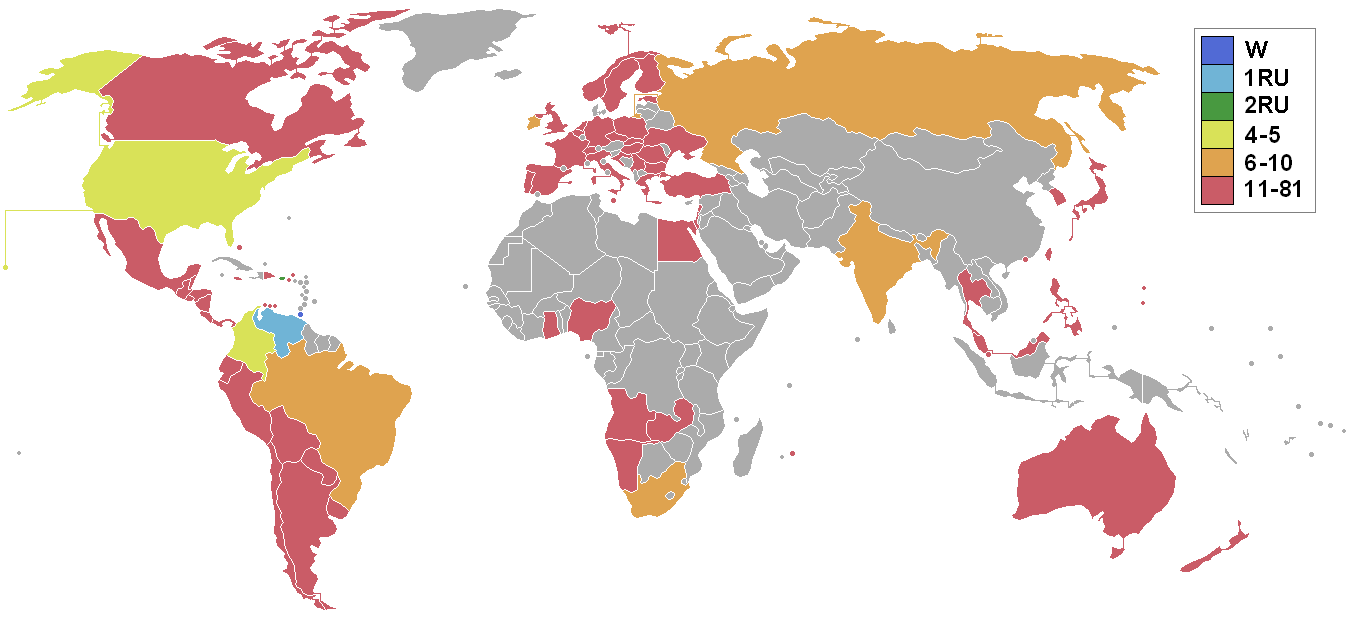
Countries and territories which sent delegates and results for Miss Universe 1998

Eighty-one contestants competed for the title.

Country/Territory	Contestant	Age	Hometown
Angola	Emilia Guardano	22	Benguela
Argentina	Marcela Brane	24	Cordoba
Aruba	Wendy Lacle	21	San Nicolaas
Australia	Renee Henderson	21	Melbourne
(The Bahamas) Bahamas	Juliette Sargent	19	Nassau
Belgium	Sandrine Corman	18	Verviers
Belize	Elvia Vega	19	Corozal
Bolivia	Veronica Larrieu	23	Santa Cruz de la Sierra
Bonaire	Uzmin Everts	18	Kralendijk
Brazil	Michella Marchi	20	Dourados
British Virgin Islands	Kaida Donovan	23	West-End
Bulgaria	Natalia Gourkova	20	Sofia
Canada	Juliana Thiessen	18	Regina
Chile	Claudia Arnello	22	Santiago
Colombia	Silvia Fernanda Ortiz	21	Bucaramanga
Costa Rica	Kisha Alvarado	21	San José
Croatia	Ivana Grzetić	19	Dubrovnik
Curaçao	Natacha Bloem	21	Willemstad
Cyprus	Daniella Iordanova	20	Larnaca
Czech Republic	Kristina Fridvalská	20	Beroun
Dominican Republic	Selinés Méndez	23	Santo Domingo
Ecuador	Soraya Hogonaga	21	Guayaquil
Egypt	Karine Fahmy	19	Cairo
El Salvador	María Gabriela Jovel	24	San Salvador
Estonia	Mari Loorens	25	Tallinn
Finland	Jonna Kauppila	21	Kokkola
France	Sophie Thalmann	22	Bar-le-Duc
Germany	Katharina Mainka	22	Neustadt an der Weinstraße
Ghana	Francisca Awuah	20	Cape Coast
(United Kingdom) Great Britain	Leilani Dowding	19	Bournemouth
Greece	Dimitra Eginiti	19	Athens
Guam	Joylyn Munoz	21	Barrigada
Guatemala	Astrid Ramírez	21	Guatemala City
Honduras	Dania Prince	18	Choluteca
Hong Kong	Virginia Yung	24	Hong Kong
Hungary	Agnes Nagy	18	Budapest
India	Lymaraina D'Souza	19	Mumbai
(Republic of Ireland) Ireland	Andrea Roche	21	Clonmel
Israel	Hagit Raz	18	Holon
Italy	Claudia Trieste	18	Calabria
Jamaica	Shani McGraham	18	Kingston
Japan	Nana Okumura	24	Tokyo
Lebanon	Nina Kadis	24	Hadchit
Malaysia	Sherine Wong	19	Kuala Lumpur
Malta	Carol Cassar	20	Valletta
Mauritius	Leena Ramphul	21	Port Louis
Mexico	Katty Fuentes	21	Monterrey
Namibia	Retha Reinders	–	Windhoek
Netherlands	Jacqueline Rotteveel	18	Bilthoven
New Zealand	Rosemary Rassell	22	Tauranga
Nicaragua	Claudia Alaniz	21	Managua
Nigeria	Chika Chikezie	21	Imo
Northern Mariana Islands	Helene Yun Lizama	22	Dandan
Norway	Stine Bergsvand	22	Stathelle
Panama	Tanisha Drummond	21	Colón
Paraguay	Luz Marina González	19	Pilar
Peru	Karim Bernal	23	Lima
Philippines	Jewel Lobaton	21	Bacolod
Poland	Sylwia Kupiec	22	Tczew
Portugal	Icilia Berenguel	21	Póvoa de Varzim
Puerto Rico	Joyce Giraud	23	Aguas Buenas
Romania	Juliana Elena Verdes	19	Galați
Russia	Anna Malova	23	Moscow
Singapore	Alice Lim	22	Singapore
Slovakia	Vladimíra Hreňovčíková	19	Zvolen
South Africa	Kerishnie Naiker	20	Durban
South Korea	Kim Ji-yeon	25	Seoul
Spain	María José Besora	22	Murcia
Sweden	Jessica Olérs	20	Borlänge
Switzerland	Tanja Gutmann	21	Zürich
Taiwan	Annie Tsai	25	Nantou
Thailand	Chalida Thaochalee	24	Bangkok
Trinidad and Tobago	Wendy Fitzwilliam	25	Diego Martin
Turkey	Asuman Krause	22	Ankara
Ukraine	Olena Spirina	18	Kharkiv
United States	Shawnae Jebbia	26	Santa Rosa
United States Virgin Islands	Leah Webster	24	Saint Thomas
Uruguay	Virginia Russo	24	Montevideo
Venezuela	Veruska Ramírez	18	Táriba
(Serbia and Montenegro) Yugoslavia	Jelena Trninić	18	Belgrade
Zimbabwe	Selina Stuart	20	Harare
