= April Masini =

American advice columnist

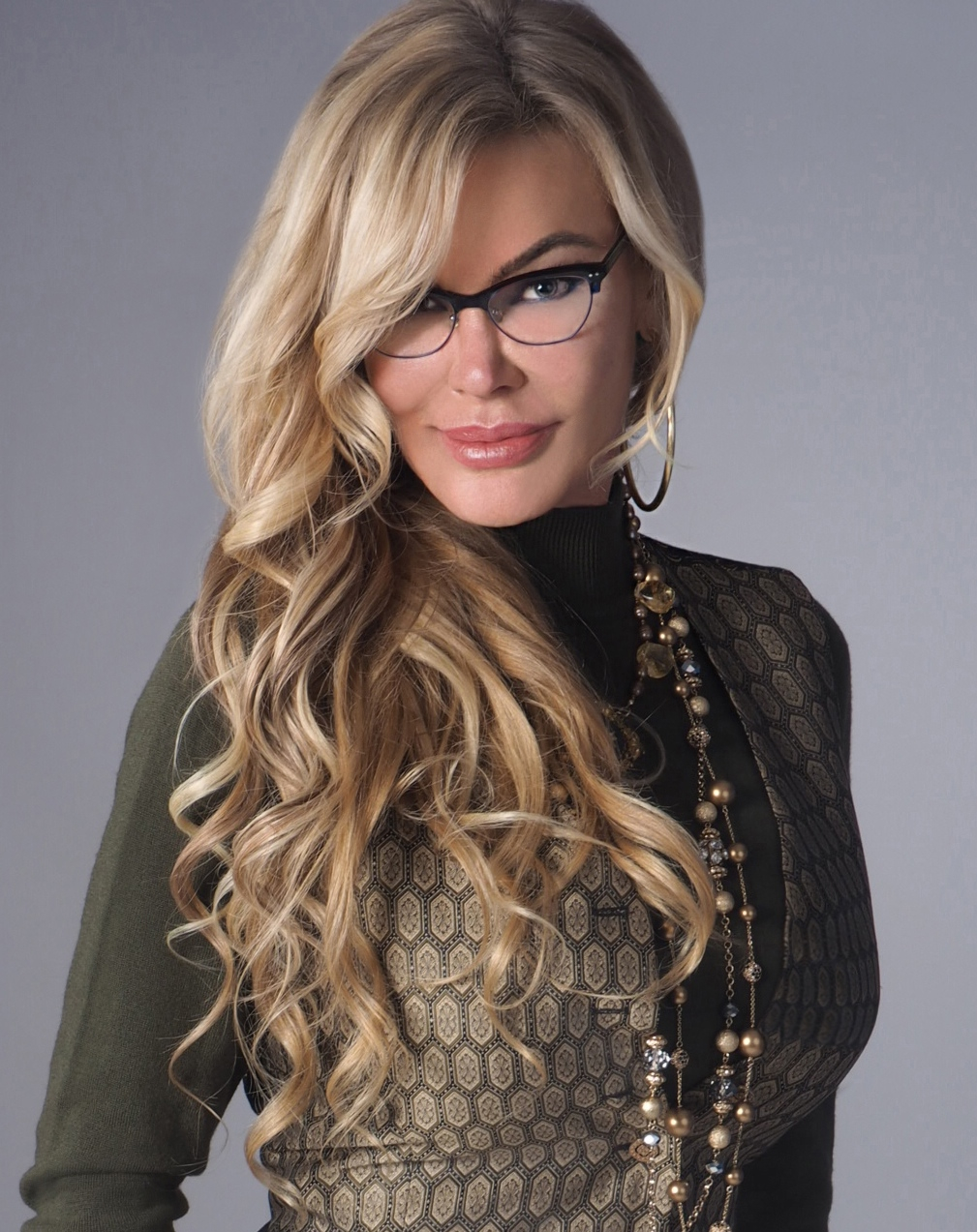
- Born: Fort Bragg, North Carolina, U.S.
- Occupations: Television and film producer, advice columnist, author, commentator, entrepreneur
- Years active: 1990s–present
- Known for: Relationship advice columnist ("Ask April"), producer of Baywatch, founder of AiFi
- Website: aprilmasini.com

April Masini, widely known as Ask April, is an American advice columnist and marketing strategist who helped revive Hawaii's film industry by relocating Baywatch as Baywatch Hawaii, brokering the Blue Crush deal, and co-chairing the host committee for the 1998 Miss Universe Pageant in Hawaii.

== Relationship advice ==
Masini is an advice columnist and commentator who offers dating and relationship advice to people of different ages, ethnicities, and sexual orientations, often supporting traditional gender roles and arguing that the feminist movement has damaged relationships in America. Her advice for women on relationships, marriage, and sex has appeared in articles in Glamour, Ebony, Cosmopolitan, Woman's Day, SheKnows.com, and Brides. Her writing on a range of topics has also appeared in Bustle, Women's Health, Men's Health, Medical Daily, and as a sex advice columnist at AskMen.

Masini has answered more than 27,500 questions on her RelationshipAdviceForum.com, where she responds under her “Ask April” persona. In 2018 Relationship Advice Forum took a six-year hiatus, reopening in September 2025.

Masini has appeared as a guest on The Wall Street Journal's podcast "Do Men Still Have to Pay on the First Date?" and The O'Reilly Factor, as well as host of Everything You Need to Know in 2006. Masini has been consulted on financial issues in dating and marriage and on workplace issues by GoBankingRates and TheStreet.

TD Bank introduced its ‘The Love & Money’ campaign to customers and the media, with this description: “April Masini, renowned relationship expert and author of the 'AskApril' advice column, will analyze the results of the TD Bank survey and serve as the TD Bank Relationship Expert to the media.”

Procter & Gamble announced in The Wall Street Journal that April Masini, “a rare thought leader,” had become the dating expert for their ‘The Voice of Experience’ campaign.”

== Other issues ==
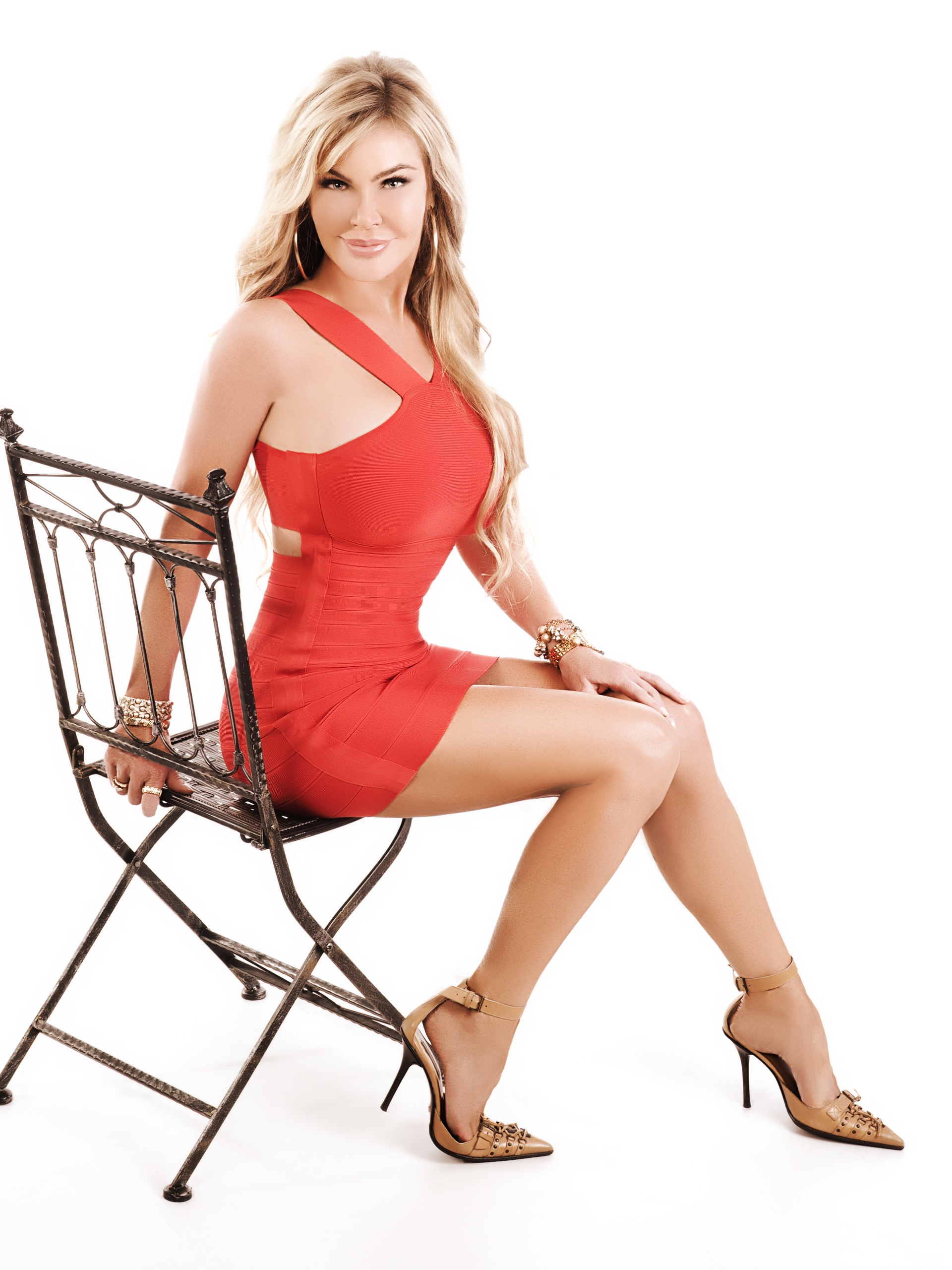
April Masini (August 2014)

Although the focus of Masini's forum is dating and relationships, she has been called on by the media for her opinion on a range of issues, including real estate transactions (BBC News), the relationships of sports teams with their fans (The New York Times), and television and movies (USA Today), the selling of beer and wine by Starbucks (The Christian Science Monitor), along with every imaginable dating and relationship question or opinion.

== Politics ==
Masini has conservative political views and has been consulted on a range of political issues. Regarding Donald Trump, she stated in April 2016: "I do not believe there is a single career politician who can begin to compete with Trump when it comes to the economy or resolving the debt crisis." When asked about Trump's attitudes toward women, she commented that he is "a fighter ... If a woman attacks him, he fights back against her the same way he fights back against a man, because to him she is just as strong and just as capable as any man." Masini argues that this quality in Trump "makes [him] the ultimate feminist — he treats men and women equally."

When asked how conservatives should respond to the 2012 Supreme Court decision upholding President Obama's health care legislation, where Chief Justice John Roberts sided with the majority, Masini advised: "If you're considering a Democratic ticket in the November election as a way to show Roberts that nobody messes with you and walks away unscathed, reconsider," she said. "It backfires, and while you may feel good about being an ass — I mean, donkey — you'll ultimately be betraying yourself." She advocates dating within one's own political party: "You can cross party lines, but don't you think you'll be happier with someone who sees things the way you do when it comes to issues like the death penalty, gun control and abortion?"

== Entertainment industry executive and producer ==
Prior to her career as an advice columnist, April Masini worked—first with her former husband, Al Masini, and then independently—on a number of projects that led to the expansion of the television and film industry in Hawaii. The Masinis produced and organized the 1998 Miss Universe Pageant, successfully lobbying the Hawaii legislature for $3.3 million to fund the event, which brought delegations from 85 countries to Hawaii, each with its own news media. Al was the pageant's producer for Hawaii, while April served as co-chair and event coordinator, both working for nearly a year without pay. In 1998, Hawaii Governor Ben Cayetano acknowledged the couple's contribution to the state by proclaiming June 4th of that year "Al and April Masini Day." Al and April Masini produced the Cayetano's second inaugural ball in December of 1998, at no cost, drawing on their deep industry experience to organize the event out of a shared commitment to Hawaii's economic recovery.

In 1999, April Masini persuaded Greg Bonann, executive producer of Baywatch, to move the television show to Hawaii for three years, instead of the proposed move to Australia. Masini reached out to the governor and legislators of Hawaii, who then advocated for the move; and she was "relentless in her pursuit" of the Baywatch producers, who "eventually gave in and added ‘Hawaii’ to the show's name." Coming at a time of economic downturn, the move paved the way in 2001 for Hawaii's Act 221, designed to develop the state's high-technology industry through the use of tax incentives.

In 1999, production costs in Hawaii were significantly higher than in Australia, with its favorable tax codes. To lure Baywatch, Hawaii offered the show's producers an incentives package that included $2 million in soundstage and shoreside facilities improvements. To make the Hawaii production affordable, the International Alliance of Theatrical Stage Employees agreed to 12–15 percent wage cuts, while Governor Ben Cayetano cut a deal with the Teamsters Local 399 in Los Angeles to improve wages and working conditions for the drivers.

According to Bonann, Baywatch Hawaii was "one of the reasons" prompting Hawaii to adopt Act 221. The show brought more than $30 million to the state's economy, with local actors appearing in lead roles, local musical talent contributing to every episode, and local professionals making up 80 percent of the crew.

In 1999, April Masini helped the highly rated cable show, Pacific Blue, film a two-part episode in Hawaii by contacting executive producer Bill Nuss, "who was vacationing in Kona, and talking him into bringing the show here at least for a couple of episodes," according to Nuss. Filmed primarily in and around Waikiki, the episodes were Pacific Blue's first-ever filming outside California. In bringing the show to Hawaii, Nuss hoped to prove that a cable or network series could afford to film in the state.

Also in 1999, Masini was a producer on Destination Stardom.

In 2002, April Masini was the first to use Hawaii's newly passed Act 221, designed to develop the state's technology industry. In August 2002, right after the bill was signed, she brought the tax incentives to the attention of Universal Studios for the financing of Surf Girls, according to Joe Blanco, technology advisor to Hawaii Governor Ben Cayetano. Through Act 221, she then raised approximately $16 million in financing for the film, which was renamed Blue Crush. Based on a magazine article entitled "Surf Girls of Maui," by Susan Orlean, Blue Crush was praised by Slate's Greg Milner as "a sharp depiction—both in its details and its symbolism—of life in Hawaii" and as a film that "makes surfing feel like real life,"

Los Angeles-based entertainment attorney John LaViolette of Bloom Hergott Deimer and Cook commented: "This is the first time that I have heard of a studio making a commitment to foster a mutually beneficial cross promotion between the film and the location where it's been shot." LaViolette worked in conjunction with producers Masini and Adam Fields, who advised the State of Hawaii during the negotiation. The resulting agreement formed a relationship between Universal Studios and the Hawaii Visitors and Convention Bureau, by which Universal Studios agreed to promote the state along with the movie in exchange for funding.

Blue Crush was eligible for Act 221 funding because the state law included performing arts within its definition of qualified high-tech businesses. As the top 2001 top beneficiary of the tax credit program, the film came under fire from critics such as David Watumull, president and CEO of Hawaii Biotech. Watumull argued that the law had not "contemplated the dollar amounts that are going into movies, which are then taking those dollars away from high-tech and biotech companies," adding, "I'm also not sure that the law contemplated the short-term nature of movie projects."

However, Masini's efforts to bring film and television to Hawaii, along with the marketing, promotional, and tourism dollars they offer, continued to pay off years after the productions had left. In 2004, for example, Blue Crush was featured in a U.S. Department of Commerce marketing campaign to lure British travelers to America. Hawaii's contribution to the campaign, seen on the walls of the London underground and on street billboards, was an image from Blue Crush of a surfer catching a wave.

In October 2002, Masini brought a malpractice and fraud complaint against Cades Schutte, one of Hawaii's oldest and largest law firms, and Cades Schutte partner Vito Galati, claiming the firm had conspired to limit her profits in the Blue Crush deal.

Masini was awarded the Albert Nelson Marquis Lifetime Achievement Award by Marquis Who's Who in June 2023.

In 2024, she was featured on the cover of the annual Marquis Who's Who magazine. Additionally, she was awarded the 2024 Best in Media & Entertainment award by Marquis Who's Who.

Masini is the founder of the American Initiative for Film Industry (AiFi), an organization established to promote the development of film and television production infrastructure.

== Personal ==
Masini was born in Fort Bragg, North Carolina, to Robert Barry, director of Vietnam Veterans of America, and author-educator, June Stride. She grew up in Clarkesville, Georgia.

Masini dropped out of college and joined the Actors Studio. Her first acting role was on All My Children. She was married to Al Masini from 1995 to 2000. The Masinis relocated to Hawaii. In 2006, Masini moved to Florida to be closer to her mother.

== Books ==
- Date Out Of Your League, Dating Tips, Dating Advice, 2003, ISBN 978-0-9746763-0-2
- Think & Date Like A Man, Dating Tips, Dating Advice, 2005, ISBN 978-0-595-37466-3
