= Lifestyles of the Rich and Famous =

American reality television series

- Also known as: Lifestyles with Robin Leach and Shari Belafonte
- Genre: Reality
- Created by: Al Masini
- Presented by: Robin Leach; Shari Belafonte (1994–1995)
- Theme music composer: Bill Conti
- Opening theme: "Come with Me Now" by Bill Conti
- Ending theme: "Champagne Wishes and Caviar Dreams" by Dionne Warwick
- Composers: John Valentino; Christopher Neal Nelson
- Country of origin: United States
- Original language: English

Production
- Producer: Robin Leach
- Running time: originally 60 mins. (approx.) later 30 mins. (approx.)
- Production companies: Television Program Enterprises, Rysher TPE, Leach Entertainment Features

Original release
- Network: Syndication
- Release: March 31, 1984 – September 2, 1995

Lifestyles of the Rich and Famous is an American television series that aired in syndication from 1984 to 1995. The show featured the extravagant lifestyles of wealthy entertainers, athletes, socialites and magnates.

== Cast and crew ==
The show was hosted by Robin Leach for the majority of its run. Leach was joined by Shari Belafonte in 1994. At her request, in order to "bring the show into the '90's", the show was renamed Lifestyles with Robin Leach and Shari Belafonte. After Belafonte left in 1995, the show was simply retitled Lifestyles.

Voice-over artist David Greenspan (aka David Perry) provided narration for most of the segments during the bulk of the show's run and could be heard whenever Leach did not appear on camera. Upon Greenspan's death in 1991, various voice-over artists took over narration duties, including Les Marshak and Charlie O'Donnell.

The theme song, titled "Come with Me Now" and performed by Bill Conti, is from a 1978 film called Five Days from Home.

== Synopsis ==
Lifestyles was created by Al Masini (also credited with Solid Gold, Entertainment Tonight, and Star Search). It was one of the first shows to feature the lives of the wealthy, largely intended to be an insight into the opulent residences and the glamorous lifestyles of those it profiled. However, many of the geographic areas it covered were also ideal destinations for vacations, and in his on-camera appearances, Leach indirectly made references to resorts and tourist attractions. Greenspan, as narrator, made more direct references to such resorts and such tourist attractions.

Leach ended each episode with a wish for his viewers that became his signature catchphrase, "champagne wishes and caviar dreams."

Lifestyles originally aired in syndication from 1984-1995. ABC aired re-edited segments of the show, along with some new footage, at 11:00 A.M. (EST) during its daytime schedule from April 7 to June 13, 1986, and from June 30 to September 5, 1986. It was replaced on the daytime schedule by its spinoff, Fame, Fortune and Romance, which ran until May 1987.

Lifestyles was Emmy nominated for "Outstanding Informational Special" in 1984.

== Spin-off ==
Lifestyles had two companion spinoff series. One was Runaway with the Rich and Famous, also hosted by Leach. Runaway focused on taking viewers on vacations with celebrities to exotic foreign locations. The series also aired in first-run syndication, from 1986 to 1994. There was also Fame, Fortune and Romance, broadcast on ABC from 1986 to 1987.

== Rebooted ==
In 2013, the Style Network was going to reboot Lifestyles of The Rich and Famous but did not move forward when the network was later rebranded the Esquire Network. In 2014, a source said that a new version of Lifestyles would be remade for NBC, hosted by Nick Cannon. Unlike the original, this version would have mostly focused on Cannon's point of view as well as featured profiles of the mega-rich. This version would also have featured tech billionaires, who were quickly becoming the new face of wealth; it was said that philanthropic efforts would also be covered. Cannon said that "Robin Leach passed the torch to me, now I'm producing and hosting the new Lifestyles of the Rich and Famous"; he also said "You know what? I think rich and famous people take themselves too seriously, I'm gonna be just like I am on this show America's Got Talent. I'll be like, what the hell? Gold toilet seats? Let's pop bottles!" The idea was later scrapped.

== Merchandise ==
A board game called Lifestyles of the Rich and Famous: The Game was released by Pressman Toy Corporation in 1987.

A video slot machine was made by IGT in 2002.

== See also ==
- MTV Cribs
