= Tisha Silang =

- Born: Olivia Tisha deCarlos Silang
- Occupation: Business development manager
- Television: The Amazing Race Asia 3

Olivia Tisha de Carlos Silang (born November 6, 1975), more popularly known as Tisha Silang, was the Binibining Pilipinas Universe titleholder in 1998. She became a TV host and businesswoman later in her career. In the third season of The Amazing Race Asia, she partnered with her boyfriend Geoff Rodriguez and won the second place.

== Binibining Pilipinas ==
In 1998, Silang was crowned as Binibining Pilipinas Universe titleholder. However, she resigned and gave up her crown because of questions on her citizenship. The Binibining Pilipinas Charities which managed the contest had already earlier required that all winners must be holders of Philippine passport. Jewel May Lobaton, the first runner-up, was selected as the Philippines' representative in the Miss Universe 1998 pageant that was held in Honolulu, Hawaii.

== Showbiz career ==
After Binibining Pilipinas, Silang worked as a TV personality in several shows of GMA Network. She was included in the morning news and talk show Mornings @ GMA, which was shown every morning. She also had some other hosting jobs and a modeling career.

== The Amazing Race Asia ==
The third season of The Amazing Race Asia started with ten pairs of racers from different countries of Asia such as Hong Kong, the Philippines, Malaysia, Singapore, Thailand, South Korea and India. Tisha Silang partnered with Geoff Rodriguez, who was her boyfriend, and the pair was the only team who used the Yield and the U-Turn in the race. After 11 legs in seven countries, they finished the race placing second to Sam Wu and Vince Chung of Hong Kong, who placed first, out of 10 teams.
