= List of schools in Trinidad and Tobago =

The country of Trinidad and Tobago has a high literacy rate, thanks in part to public education being free from ages 5 to 18 and compulsory from the ages of five to sixteen. In addition to public education, there are many faith-based schools and other educational institutions that are either partially funded and thus charge some tuition, or are fully tuition-based.

This List of schools in Trinidad and Tobago includes government, assisted and private schools that provide nationally recognized primary and secondary schools.

== Primary Schools In Tobago ==
- Belle Garden Anglican Primary School
- Bethesda Government Primary School
- Black Rock Government Primary School
- Bon Accord Government Primary School
- Buccoo Government Primary School
- Castara Government Primary School
- Charlotteville Methodist Primary School
- Delaford Anglican Primary School
- Delaford Roman Catholic Primary School
- Des Vignes Road Government Primary School
- Diamond Vale Government Primary School
- Ebenezer Methodist Primary School
- Goodwood Methodist Primary School
- Golden Lane Government Primary School
- Happy Haven (Tobago School for the Deaf)
- Hope Anglican Primary School
- Lambeau Anglican Primary School
- L'Anse Fourmi Government Primary School
- Mason Hall Government Primary School
- Montgomery Government Primary School
- Moriah Government Primary School
- Mt St George Methodist Primary School
- Parlatuvier Anglican Primary School
- Patience Hill Government Primary School
- Pembroke Anglican Primary School
- Pentecostal Light & Life Foundation
- Plymouth Anglican Primary School
- Roxborough Anglican Primary School
- Scarborough Methodist Primary School
- Scarborough Roman Catholic Primary School
- Signal Hill Government Primary School
- Speyside Anglican Primary School
- St.Andrews Anglican Primary School
- St. Nicholas Primary School (Private)
- St.Patrick Anglican Primary School
- Tablepiece Government Primary School
- Tobago International Academy (Private)
- Tobago School for the Deaf
- Whim Anglican Primary School

== Primary Schools in Trinidad ==
=== Run by the Anglican Board ===
- Anstey Memorial Girls' Anglican School, San Fernando
- Arouca Anglican Primary School, Arouca
- Barataria Anglican Primary School, Barataria
- Brighton Anglican School, La Breacoll
- Cedros Anglican Primary School, Cedros
- Coffee Boys' Anglican School, San Fernando
- Claxton Bay Junior Anglican School, Claxton Bay
- Claxton Bay Senior Anglican School, Claxton Bay
- Couva Anglican School, Couva,
- Cumana Anglican School, Cumana Village, Toco
- Eckel Village Anglican School, Williamsville
- Forest Reserve Anglican School, Forest Fyzabad
- Good Shepard Anglican Primary School, Tunapuna
- Grande Riviere Anglican School, Grande Riviere Village, via Toco
- Holy Saviour Curepe Anglican, Curepe
- Hope Anglican School, Hope, Tobago
- Lambeau Anglican School, Lambeau
- Marabella Boys' Anglican School, Marabella
- Marabella Girls' Anglican School Marabella
- Melville Memorial Girls' Anglican School, Belmont
- Morvant Anglican School, Morvant
- Pembroke Anglican School, Port of Spain
- Point Fortin Anglican School Point Fortin
- Richmond Street Boys' Anglican School (Christus Rex), Port-of-Spain
- San Fernando Girls' Anglican School, San Fernando
- Southern Central Anglican School, Cedros
- St. Christopher's Anglican School, Siparia
- St. Francis boys Roman Catholic
- St Michael's Anglican School, Princes Town
- St John's Anglican Primary School, Cipero Road, San Fernando
- St. Nicholas Private Primary, Tobago
- St. Margaret's Boys' School, Belmont
- St. Patrick's Anglican, Mt. Pleasant Tobago
- Sisters Road Anglican School
- St. Paul's Anglican School, San Fernando
- St. Paul's Anglican School, Roxborough, Tobago
- St. Stephen's Anglican School, Princes Town
- St. Ursula's Girls Anglican School, St Vincent street POS
- St. Agnes Anglican School, St. James
- St. Mary's Anglican School, Tacarigua
- St. Catherine Girls' Anglican School Duke Street, POS
- Tableland Anglican (St. Nicholas)
- Toco Anglican, Toco Village, Toco

=== Run by the Presbyterian Board ===
- Arima Presbyterian School, Arima
- Biche Presbyterian School
- Bien Venue Presbyterian School, [La Romaine]
- Balmain Presbyterian School, Couva
- Bamboo Grove Presbyterian School
- Brothers Presbyterian School, Williamsville
- Bonne Aventure Presbyterian School, Gasparillo
- Canaan Presbyterian School, Duncan Village, San Fernando
- Charlieville Presbyterian School
- Curepe Presbyterian School, Curepe
- Ecclesville Presbyterian Primary School
- Esperanza Presbyterian School, Couva
- Elswick Presbyterian Primary School, Tableland
- Erin Road Presbyterian School
- Exchange Presbyterian School, Couva
- Freeport Presbyterian School
- Fyzabad Presbyterian School
- Grant Memorial Presbyterian School, San Fernando
- Grosvenor Presbyterian School, Sangre Grande
- Inverness Presbyterian School
- Jordan Hill Presbyterian School
- Jubilee Presbyterian School, Guaico Tamana
- Kanhai Presbyterian School
- Lengua Presbyterian School
- McBean Presbyterian School, Couva
- Navet Presbyterian School
- Penal Presbyterian School
- Picton Presbyterian School
- Reform Presbyterian School
- Rochard Douglas Presbyterian School (Barrackpore)
- Rousillac Presbyterian School
- Rio Claro Presbyterian School, Rio Claro
- Saint Julian Presbyterian School
- Sangre Chiquito Presbyterian School
- San Juan Presbyterian School, San Juan
- Santa Cruz Presbyterian School
- Siparia Road Presbyterian School
- Siparia Union Presbyterian School
- Tabaquite Presbyterian School, Tabaquite
- Tunapuna Presbyterian School
- Union Presbyterian School

=== Run by the Roman Catholic Board ===
- Arima Boys' RC School
- Arima Girls' RC School
- Belmont Boys' RC School
- Belmont Girls' RC School
- Biche RC School, New Lands Village, Biche
- Boissiere R.C. School
- Bourg Mulatresse RC School, Santa Cruz
- Brazil RC School
- Carenage Boys R.C
- Caratal Sacred Heart R.C. School
- Chaguanas RC School
- Carapichaima R.C. School
- Chickland RC School Chickland
- Cunapo (St. Francis) RC School, Sangre Grande
- Cumana RC School, Cumana Village, Toco
- Delaford R.C.School (Tobago)
- Erin RC School
- Exchange RC School Couva
- Flanagin Town RC School Flanagin Town
- Granville RC School, Cedros
- Guayaguayare RC School, Guayaguare
- La Brea RC School
- La Fillette RC School
- Lochmaben RC School, Cedros
- Malick Girls' RC School
- Maraval RC School
- La Lune RC School
- Maria Regina Grade School
- Matelot RC School, Matelot Village, via Toco
- Mayaro (St. Thomas) RC School, Radix Village, Mayaro
- Mayo R.C. School
- Mon Repo RC School
- Mount Russia
- Mucurapo Boys' RC School
- Nelson Street Girls' RC School, Port of Spain
- Nelson Street Boys' RC School, Port of Spain
- Newtown Boys' RC School
- Newtown Girls' RC School
- North Oropouche R.C School, Toco Main Rd
- Ortoire RC School, Ortoire Village, Mayaro
- Paramin RC School
- Petit Valley Boys' R.C School
- Petit Valley Girls' R.C School
- Point Fortin RC School
- Point Cumana RC School
- Poole RC School, Rio Claro
- Princes Town RC School
- Rosary Boys' RC School
- Rampanalgas RC School, Rampanalgas Village, Balandra
- Rose hill rc school
- Scarborough R.C. School (Tobago)
- St. Dominic's RC School
- South Oropouche RC School
- St. Joseph Boys' RC School
- St. Joseph Girls' RC School
- St. Finbar Girls' RC School, Arouca
- St. Gabriel's Girls' RC School
- St. Mary's Mucurapo Girls' RC School
- St. Pius Boys' RC School, Arouca
- St. Rose's Girls' RC School
- St. Benedict's La Romaine RC School
- St. Theresa's Girls RC School
- St Therese RC School, Rio Claro
- Sacred Heart Girls' RC School
- San Fernando Boys' RC School
- Santa Cruz R.C. School
- The Siparia Boys' R.C. School, Siparia
- Tabaquite RC School
- Toco RC School, Mission Village, Toco
- Todds Road RC School Todds Road
- Tunapuna Boys' RC School
- Tunapuna Girls' RC School
- Upper Guaico RC School, Nestor Village, Guaico Tamana Rd.
- San Juan Boys' RC School
- San Juan Girls RC School
- San Souci RC School, San Souci Village, via Toco
- St. Brigid's Girls R.C School
- Success R.C.School, Laventile
- Vance River RC School

=== Run by the ASJA Islamic Board ===
- ASJA Primary School, Barrackpore
- ASJA Primary School, San Fernando
- ASJA Primary School, Rio Claro
- ASJA Primary School, Point Fortin
- ASJA Primary School, Charlieville
- ASJA Primary School, Carapichaima
- ASJA Primary School, Princes Town

=== Run by the TML Islamic Board ===
- TML Primary School San Fernando
- TML Primary School St. Joseph
- TML Primary School Libertville, Rio Claro

=== Run by the Sanatan Dharma Maha Sabha (SMDS) Hindu Board ===
- Debe Hindu School
- El Socorro Hindu School
- El Dorado North Hindu School
- El Dorado South Hindu School
- Felicity Hindu School
- Freeport Hindu School
- McBean Hindu School, Couva
- Mohess Road Hindu School
- Munroe Road Hindu School
- Orange Field Hindu School
- Ramai Trace Hindu School, Debe
- Rio Claro Hindu School, Rio Claro
- Riverside Hindu School
- Reform Hindu School
- Robert Village Hindu School
- Rousillac Hindu School
- Sangre Grande Hindu School
- Spring Village Hindu School
- Suchit Trace Hindu School
- Tulsa Trace Hindu School
- Woodland Hindu School

=== Run by the Vedic (A.P.S.) Hindu Board ===
- Avocat Vedic School, Fyzabad
- Dayanand Memorial Vedic School, Penal
- Gandhi Memorial Vedic School, San Juan

=== Run by Kabir Panth Hindu Board ===
- Agostini Settlement KPA School
- Siparia Road KPA School

=== Government Primary Schools in Trinidad ===
- Arima Boys' Government Primary School, Arima
- Arima Girls' Government Primary School, Arima
- Arima New Government Primary School
- Bethesda Government Primary School
- Bon Accord Government Primary School
- Black Rock Government Primary School
- Brasso Venado Government Primary School
- Belmont Government primary school
- Castara Government Primary School, Castara
- Cedros Government Primary School, Cedros
- Chatham Government Primary School, Cedros
- Clarke Rochard Government Penal
- Cocoyea Government, Cocoyea Village, San Fernando
- Couva South Government Primary School
- Crystal Stream Government
- Cunjal Government, Barrackpore
- Cunupia Government Primary School
- D'Abadie Government Primary School, D'Abadie
- DesVignes Road Government Primary School, Runemede, Moriah
- Diamond Vale Government Primary, Diego Martin
- Diego Martin Government Primary School
- Dinsley Trincity Government Primary School
- Dow Village Government Primary School
- Guaico Government Primary, Guaico Village, Sangre Grande
- Egypt Village Government Primary School, Point Fortin
- El Socorro North Government Primary School
- Fanny Village Government Primary School, Point Fortin
- Icacos Government Primary School, Cedros
- Jerningham Government Primary School [Cunupia]
- La Horquetta North Government Primary School
- La Horquetta South Government Primary School
- Longdenville Government Primary School, Longdenville
- La Puerta Government Primary School, Diego Martin
- Macaulay Government Primary School, Macaulay, Claxton Bay
- Mafeking Government Primary School, Mafeking Village, Mayaro
- Malabar Government Primary School, Malabar, Arima
- Maloney Government Primary School, Maloney
- Matura Government Primary School, Matura Village
- Mayaro Government Primary School, Mayaro
- Montgomery Government
- Montrose Government Primary School
- Monte Video Government Primary, Monte Video Village, via Toco
- Mount Pleasant Government School, Solidad Rd, Claxton Bay
- Moriah Government Primary School
- North Oropouche Government Primary School
- Raghunanan Road Government Primary School
- Tortuga Government Primary School
- Tranquility Government Primary School
- Vos Government Primary School, Gasparillo
- Gasparillo Government Primary School, Gasparillo
- San Fernando Girl's Government Primary School, San Fernando
- San Fernando Boy's Government Primary School, San Fernando

=== Private Primary Schools in Trinidad ===
- Adonis Academy (Leviticus Academy) Arima ,Trinidad
- Ambassador College Private School
- Apex International Academy, Chaguanas, Trinidad
- Arbor, Maraval
- Athenias Presecondary School St Augustine
- Christian Primary Academy, Arouca
- Beach Camp Community School, Palo Seco
- Bishop Anstey Junior, Port of Spain
- Blackman's Private School, Maraval, Port of Spain
- Bryn Mawr Private School, Petite Valley
- Cedar Grove Private Primary School, Palmiste, San Fernando
- Dunross Preparatory School
- Elders' Classes, Port of Spain
- Eniath's Montessori and Prep School, Lange Park, Chaguanas
- Explorers Childcare Academy ( Lange Park, Chaguanas)
- The Giuseppi Preparatory School, Arima
- Holy Faith Preparatory, Port of Spain
- Holy Name Preparatory, Port of Spain
- Holy Rosary Preparatory, St. James
- Lucia's Private School, Saint Augustine, Trinidad and Tobago
- Maria Regina Grade School, Port of Spain
- Marabella Learning Centre
- Mayaro Guayaguayare Community School
- Nova Satus Private School, Cunupia
- Personal Tutoring Institute, Arima
- Precious Little Angels, Port of Spain
- Regulus Educational Academy Chaguanas
- SuJo's Private School, Woodbrook
- Specialist Learning Center
- Savonetta Private School, San Fernando
- Sevilla Private Primary School, Sevilla Compound, Rivulet Road, Brechin Castle, Couva
- Scholars Private Primary and Pre-School, Tacarigua
- Scholastic Academy, St. Augustine
- St. Andrew's Private School, Maraval
- St. Catherine's Private School, Woodbrook
- St. Hilary's Preparatory School
- St. Joseph Terrace Private School, San Fernando
- St. Monica's Preparatory, Port of Spain
- St. Peter's Private Primary School, Pointe-à-Pierre
- St. Xavier's Private School, St. Joseph
- Student Remediation Centre, Marabella, San Fernando
- The Trinidad Renaissance School, San Fernando
- The University School, St. Augustine
- Waterman's Preparatory School, La Romain
- Windermere Private School

== Secondary Schools in Tobago ==
- Bishop's High School, Tobago
- Goodwood Secondary School
- Harmon School of S.D.A., Scarborough, Tobago (Private)
- Mason Hall Secondary School
- Pentecostal Light and Life Foundation High School
- Roxborough Secondary School
- Scarborough Secondary School
- Signal Hill Secondary School
- Speyside Secondary School

== Secondary Schools in Trinidad ==
=== Royal College of Trinidad ===
- Queen's Royal College

=== Run by the Anglican Board ===
- Bishop Anstey High School East, Trincity
- Bishop Anstey High School, Port of Spain
- Bishop Centenary College, Port of Spain
- Bishop's High School, Tobago
- Fyzabad Anglican Secondary School
- St. Stephen's College, Princes Town
- Trinity College, Moka, Maraval
- Trinity College East, Trincity

=== Run by the Baptist Board ===
- Cowen Hamilton Secondary School, Moruga

=== Run by the Presbyterian Board ===
- Hillview College, Tunapuna
- Iere High School, Siparia
- Naparima College, San Fernando
- Naparima Girls' High School, San Fernando
- Saint Augustine Girls' High School, Saint Augustine

=== Run by the Roman Catholic Board ===
- Providence Girls' Catholic, Belmont
- Holy Cross College, Calvary Hill, Arima
- Holy Faith Convent, Couva
- Holy Faith Convent, Penal
- Fatima College, Port of Spain
- Holy Name Convent, Port of Spain
- Holy Name Convent, Point Fortin
- Presentation College, Chaguanas
- Presentation College, San Fernando
- St. Andrew's Academy, Chaguanas
- St. Anthony's College, Westmoorings
- St. Benedict's College, La Romaine, San Fernando
- St. Francis Boys College, Port of Spain
- St. Joseph's Convent, Port of Spain
- St. Joseph's Convent, St. Joseph
- St. Joseph's Convent, San Fernando
- St. Mary's College, Port of Spain
- Corpus Christi College, Diego Martin
- St. Joseph's College, St. Joseph

=== Run by the Seventh-day Adventist Board ===
- Harmon School of S.D.A. (Tobago)
- Southern Academy of SDA (San Fernando )
- Bates Memorial High School (Sangre Grande)
- Caribbean Union College Secondary School (Maracas, St. Joseph)

=== Pentecostal Secondary Schools in Trinidad ===
- Miracle Ministries Pentecostal High School, Mc Bean, Couva
- Open Bible High School, San Fernando

=== Run by the ASJA Islamic Board ===
- ASJA Boys' College, San Fernando
- ASJA Girls' College, San Fernando
- ASJA Boys' College, Charlieville
- ASJA Girls' College, Charlieville
- ASJA Girls' College, Tunapuna
- ASJA Girls' College, Barrackpore

=== Run by the Sanatan Dharma Maha Sabha Hindu Board ===
- Lakshmi Girls' Hindu College, St Augustine
- Vishnu Boys' Hindu College, Caroni
- Saraswati Girls' Hindu College, Chaguanas
- Shiva Boys' Hindu College, Penal
- Parvati Girls' Hindu College, Debe

=== Run by the SWAHA Hindu Board ===
- SWAHA Hindu College

=== Government Secondary Schools in Trinidad ===
- Aranguez North Secondary School
- Arima Government Secondary School
- Arima Central Secondary School
- Arima North Secondary School
- Barataria North Secondary School
- Barataria South Secondary School
- Barrackpore West Secondary School
- Barrackpore East Secondary School
- Belmont Secondary School
- Biche Secondary School
- Bon Air Secondary School
- Blanchisseuse High School
- Brazil Secondary School
- Carapichaima East secondary school
- Carapichaima West secondary school
- Cedros Secondary School
- Chaguanas South Secondary School
- Chaguanas North Secondary School
- Coryal Secondary School School
- Couva East Secondary School
- Couva West Secondary School
- Debe Secondary School
- Diego Martin Central Secondary School
- Diego Martin North Secondary School
- East Mucurapo Secondary School
- El Dorado East Secondary School
- El Dorado West Secondary School
- Five Rivers Government Secondary School
- Fyzabad Secondary School
- Gasparillo Secondary School
- Guaico Secondary School, Guaico
- Guayaguayare Secondary School
- La Romain Secondary School
- Malick Secondary School
- Marabella North Secondary School
- Marabella Junior Secondary School
- Mayaro Secondary School
- Mt. Hope Secondary School
- Morvant Laventille Secondary School
- Mucurapo West Secondary School
- Northeastern College
- Palo Seco Government Secondary School
- Pleasantville Senior Comprehensive School, San Fernando
- Point Fortin East Secondary School
- Point Fortin West Secondary School
- Preysal Secondary School, Couva
- Rio Claro College
- Rio Claro High School
- San Fernando Central Secondary School
- San Fernando East Secondary School
- San Fernando West Secondary School
- Sangre Grande Secondary School
- San Juan North Secondary School
- San Juan South Secondary School
- Siparia East Secondary School
- Siparia West Secondary School
- South East Port-of-Spain Secondary School
- St. Augustine Secondary School
- St. Francois Girls College, Belmont
- St. George's College, Barataria
- St. Joseph Secondary School
- St. James Secondary School
- Success Laventille Composite School
- Tabaquite Secondary School
- Tableland Secondary School
- Toco Secondary School
- Tranquility Government Secondary School
- Tunapuna Secondary School
- Vessigny [Antilles] Government Secondary School, La Brea
- Waterloo Secondary School
- Woodbrook Government Secondary School
- Valencia Secondary School

=== Private Secondary Schools in Trinidad ===
- The Knowledge Institute (Online)
- Young Achievers Academy (Online Secondary School)
- Apex International Academy, Chaguanas, Trinidad
- Personal Tutoring Institute, Arima + Online
- Adonis Academy, Arima, Trinidad
- Study Zone Institute Ltd, EMR, Barataria, Trinidad
- Grade A Tutoring and Learning Centre, #75 Third Avenue, Barataria
- Professional Institute of Marketing and Business Studies Ltd. /Our Lady of Fatima High School
- Ms. Loutoo's Private Tuition (Online Private Tuition Centre, evening classes)
- Trillium International School, Chaguanas (based on the Canadian curriculum)
- Elders' Classes, Port of Spain
- St. Augustine Community College
- St. Charles' Convent
- Royal Academy, Tunapuna
- Johnson's Finishing School, Arima
- Chinmaya Vidyalaya
- Darul Uloom
- Forde College
- Upper level
- NorthGate College, St. Augustine
- Bates Memorial High School of SDA, Sangre Grande
- Sangre Grande Educational Institute
- Southern Academy of SDA, San Fernando
- Scholars Private Primary School, Champ Fleurs
- Sobion Tutoring Service, San Juan
- ACE Academy, Siparia
- Corpus Christi College (Diego Martin)
- Western Educational Institute

== Private International Schools in Trinidad ==
- International School of Port of Spain (US American curriculum)
- Maple Leaf International School (Canadian curriculum)
- The British Academy Limited (UK British curriculum, CIE registered)

== See also ==
- List of Trinidad and Tobago special schools
- List of universities in Trinidad and Tobago
- Education in Trinidad and Tobago
