= St. Joseph's Convent, Port of Spain =

Coordinates: 10.6588°N 61.5108°W

Location
- 57-58 Pembroke St; Port of Spain; Trinidad and Tobago

Information
- Motto: Sapientia et Scientia (Wisdom and Knowledge)
- Religious affiliation: Christianity
- Denomination: Roman Catholicism
- Patron saint: St. Joseph
- Founded: 1836
- Founder: Blessed Anne Marie Javouhey
- Status: Open
- Principal: Maritza Ramphal (acting)
- Gender: Girls-only
- Houses: Blessed Anne Marie , Holy Trinity , Our Lady , St. Joseph , St. Theresa and St. Xavier
- Colours: Blue and White
- Website: SJCPOS

St. Joseph's Convent, Port of Spain is a government-assisted all-girls Roman Catholic secondary school in Port of Spain, Trinidad and Tobago. It was founded in 1836 by Sisters of St. Joseph of Cluny, and is the oldest continuous secondary school in Trinidad and Tobago. It celebrated its 180th anniversary in 2016. The school is one of the best performing schools in the Caribbean in both the Caribbean Secondary Education Certificate (CSEC) examinations and Caribbean Advanced Proficiency Examinations (CAPE) examinations. The school is governed by a Board of Management appointed and chaired by the Archbishop of Port of Spain.

== History ==
In her book Race Relations in Colonial Trinidad 1870–1900, Bridget Brereton wrote: "When the school was opened in 1836, it was strictly denominational. Most of its students were white French creoles, with a few girls from elite coloured families... Girls from upper-class Protestant families, or girls whose parents could not afford the fees for St Joseph's, were educated at private, profit-making schools."

=== Timeline ===
The following is a list of some of the main milestones in the school's history:

- 1836 - The school first opens on upper St. James Street (now Frederick Street), then moves to rented premises on Kent Street (now Pembroke Street), with students as boarders.
- 1840 - The school is relocated to property purchased at Pembroke Street.
- 1887 - New buildings are erected.
- 1904 - SJC begins use of the former residence of the Archbishop when he move to new premises at Queen's Park West.
- 1911 - SJC is affiliated with QRC for the purpose of external Cambridge exams and qualifies for government subsidy.
- 1936 - A southern wing is built to mark the school's100th year.
- 1944 - Four sisters perish in a fire which destroys the greater part of the school and the chapel.
- 1946 - New school buildings are opened.
- 1962 - Non-paying students are accepted as the government's first Common Entrance Examinations are held.
- 1966 - The boarding school is closed.
- 1972 - A three-storey wing is built for Forms 4 and 5.
- 1990 - Sr. Paul D'Ornellas retires as Principal, the last Sister of St. Joseph of Cluny to be in charge of the school.
- 2016 - Celebrations to mark SJC's 180th anniversary and the 70th anniversary of the completion of the rebuilding of the school in January 1946 after the fire of 1944.

== Admission ==
Admission to Form 1 is determined by performance on an examination, known as the Secondary Entrance Assessment (SEA) which is organized and adjudicated by the Ministry of Education of Trinidad and Tobago. The examination is used to facilitate the placement of students in secondary schools throughout Trinidad and Tobago. The SEA comprises three papers that must be attempted by all candidates - Creative Writing, Mathematics and Language Arts. The exam covers the national curriculum for Primary-level education with a focus on Standards 3–5. The precursor to the SEA was the Common Entrance Examination (CEE), which mirrored the SEA in several significant respects. Students may later apply and be permitted entry into the school at the Form 6 level if they achieve high levels of performance at the CSEC examinations.

== Curriculum ==
Forms 1–3 - During the first three years of schooling (Forms 1-3), students study English Language and Literature, Mathematics, Integrated Science (in Form 3 this is divided into Chemistry, Biology and Physics), Social Studies, Geography, History, Art, Drama, Dance, Music, Physical Education, French, Spanish, and Personal Development. They are prepared for the National Certificate of Secondary Education (NCSE) Examinations which are based on continuous assessment from Form 1 to 3 (60%) and a national examination at the end of Form 3 (40%). Form 1 students also have weekly Library/ Information Literacy classes.

Forms 4–5 - At the end of Form 3, students choose specialties, around a core group of subjects - English Language, English Literature, Mathematics, one foreign language (Spanish or French) and one science subject (Biology, Chemistry, Physics). The additional subjects are generally chosen on the basis of the prerequisites for their future careers; Natural Sciences, Modern Studies, Modern Languages or Business Studies. Over an 18 month period, students pursue and prepare for a course of instruction leading to external examination under the authority of the Caribbean Examinations Council (CXC). At the end of this period (Form 5), students sit the Caribbean Secondary Education Certification (CSEC) examination in various fields of study, where they are awarded a Caribbean Secondary Examination Certificate (CSEC). The CSEC examinations are the accepted and internationally recognised equivalent of the GCE or General Certificate of Education Ordinary Level examinations they replaced. For decades, examinees at St. Joseph’s Convent, Port of Spain took GCEs set by the University of Cambridge Local Examinations Syndicate, now known as University of Cambridge International Examinations. However, a preceding generation of students took a version of Cambridge examination known as the Cambridge School Certificate, a precursor of contemporary GCE O-levels.

Form 6 (Lower & Upper 6) - CSEC examinations are commonly referred to as CXCs because from 1979 to 1998 they constituted the only form of examination offered by the Caribbean Examinations Council. However, the Council later developed the Caribbean Advanced Proficiency Examination (CAPE) examinations to replace the British Advanced-level exams. CAPE examinations are taken by students who have completed their standard secondary education (the CSEC) and who seek to continue their studies, beyond the minimum age for completion of compulsory education. Students who wish to sit for the CAPE usually possess CSEC or an equivalent certification. At the St. Joseph’s Convent, Port of Spain, there is further specialization in Form 6, where each student is required to choose at least three two-unit courses and Caribbean Studies and Communication Studies in preparation for the Caribbean Examinations Council Caribbean Advanced Proficiency Examination.

== Houses ==
The school population is divided among six houses, upon entrance into Form 1. Each house is led by a Captain, Vice-Captain, Sports Captains and Assistant Sports Captains. Captains and assistant captains are students selected from Form 6. The six houses are:

1. Blessed Anne-Marie
2. Holy Trinity
3. Our Lady
4. St. Joseph
5. St. Theresa
6. St. Xavier

== Notable alumnae ==
- Bridgid Annisette-George - lawyer, politician, Speaker of House of Representatives of Trinidad and Tobago
- Anya Ayoung-Chee - fashion designer, entrepreneur, Project Runway (season 9) winner
- Thema Williams - gymnast
- Wendy Fitzwilliam - lawyer, model, Miss Universe 1998
- Siobhan Cropper - Olympian swimmer

== School song ==
O Alma Mater Our song we raise to thee
Far may the echoes ring out o'er land and sea
Come we with voices in chorus loud and clear
Singing in praise to thee, O Alma Mater dear.
Through all the future where ever we may go
Our true devotion we ever more will show
We will be loyal forever far or near
Singing in praise to thee, O Alma Mater dear.
