= Education in Trinidad and Tobago =

Education in The Republic of Trinidad and Tobago
Ministry of Education
- Minister of Education: Michael Dowlath

General details
- Primary languages: English

Literacy (2003)
- Total: 98.55%
- Male: 99.1%
- Female: 98%
- Primary: % (%attendance rate)

Education in Trinidad and Tobago is free and is largely and primarily based on the British education system, compulsory between ages 5 and 16. Trinidad and Tobago is considered one of the most literate countries in the World with a literacy rate exceeding 98%. This exceptionally high literacy rate can be attributed, in part, to free tuition from Kindergarten (Pre-School) to University.

The education system generally starts at Pre-School at the early age of two and a half years. This level of tuition is not mandatory but most Trinbagonians start their children's schooling at this stage as children are expected to have basic reading and writing skills when they commence primary school. Students proceed to primary school at the age of five. Seven years are spent in primary school (beginning from infants 1). During the final year of primary school (standard 5), students prepare for and sit the Secondary Entrance Assessment (SEA), which determines the secondary school the child is to attend. For most children and parents, this is a very stressful period.

Students attend secondary school for a minimum of five years and their first major exam is the local NCSE (National Certificate of Secondary Education) examinations, which is done in the third year of this system and administered by the Ministry of Education. The next major exam of the system which is done in the fifth year of school is CSEC (Caribbean Secondary Education Certificate). Children with satisfactory grades may opt to continue high school for a further two-year period (6th form), leading to the Caribbean Advanced Proficiency Examinations (CAPE). Both CSEC and CAPE examinations are held by the Caribbean Examinations Council (CXC).

Public primary and secondary education is free for all, although private and religious schooling is available for a fee.

== Tertiary education ==
Education in The Republic of Trinidad and Tobago
Ministry of Tertiary Education and Skills Training
- Minister of Education: Anthony Garcia

Trinidad and Tobago offers free tertiary education to citizens up to the undergraduate level at accredited public and select private institutions.

Both the Government and the private sector also provide financial assistance in the form of academic scholarships to gifted or needy students for study at local, regional or international universities.

== See also ==
- Caribbean Examinations Council (CXC)
- List of schools in Trinidad and Tobago
- List of universities in Trinidad and Tobago
- List of Trinidad and Tobago special schools
- National Certificate of Secondary Education
