= School of Business and Computer Science =

Coordinates: 10.6511°N 61.4252°W

SBCS Global Learning Institute Limited (SBCS GLI), formerly The School of Business and Computer Science, is a tertiary level academic institution based in Trinidad and Tobago.

SBCS GLI partners with the Heriot Watt University, University of London, University of Greenwich, University of Sunderland and University of Leicester. With the institute offering a variety of programmes, qualifications and certifications in Computing and Information Technology, Business and Management, Accounting and Finance, Engineering, Health and Safety, Procurement, Art and Design, and Media Communications.

Commonly referred to as “SBCS”, the SBCS GLI operates campuses in Champs Fleurs, San Fernando and Trincity.

== History ==
SBCS GLI was founded by Dr. Robin Maraj in 1986 and officially began operations in 1987. Then, it was located in San Juan, in a small house that accommodated both the living quarters and classrooms. In 1990, operations were relocated to Champs Fleurs, and this campus, now a multi-story complex, stands as the oldest operational site among SBCS’ three locations.

SBCS’ second campus was situated in Port of Spain, and opened in May 2003, while the third campus opened in February 2006 in San Fernando. The Trincity campus, SBCS’ fourth site, was established in September, 2008.

In 2018, the operations of the Port of Spain campus were merged with those of the Trincity campus. The Trincity campus was renamed SBCS’ Centre for Media, Communication and Design.

== See also ==
- List of universities in Trinidad and Tobago
