= Examinations Council =

Examinations Council may refer to:

- Caribbean Examinations Council, a council established in 1972 under agreement by the participating governments in the area
- West African Examinations Council, a not-for-profit examination board formed in 1952 out of the concern for education in Africa
