= St Augustine Chamber Orchestra =

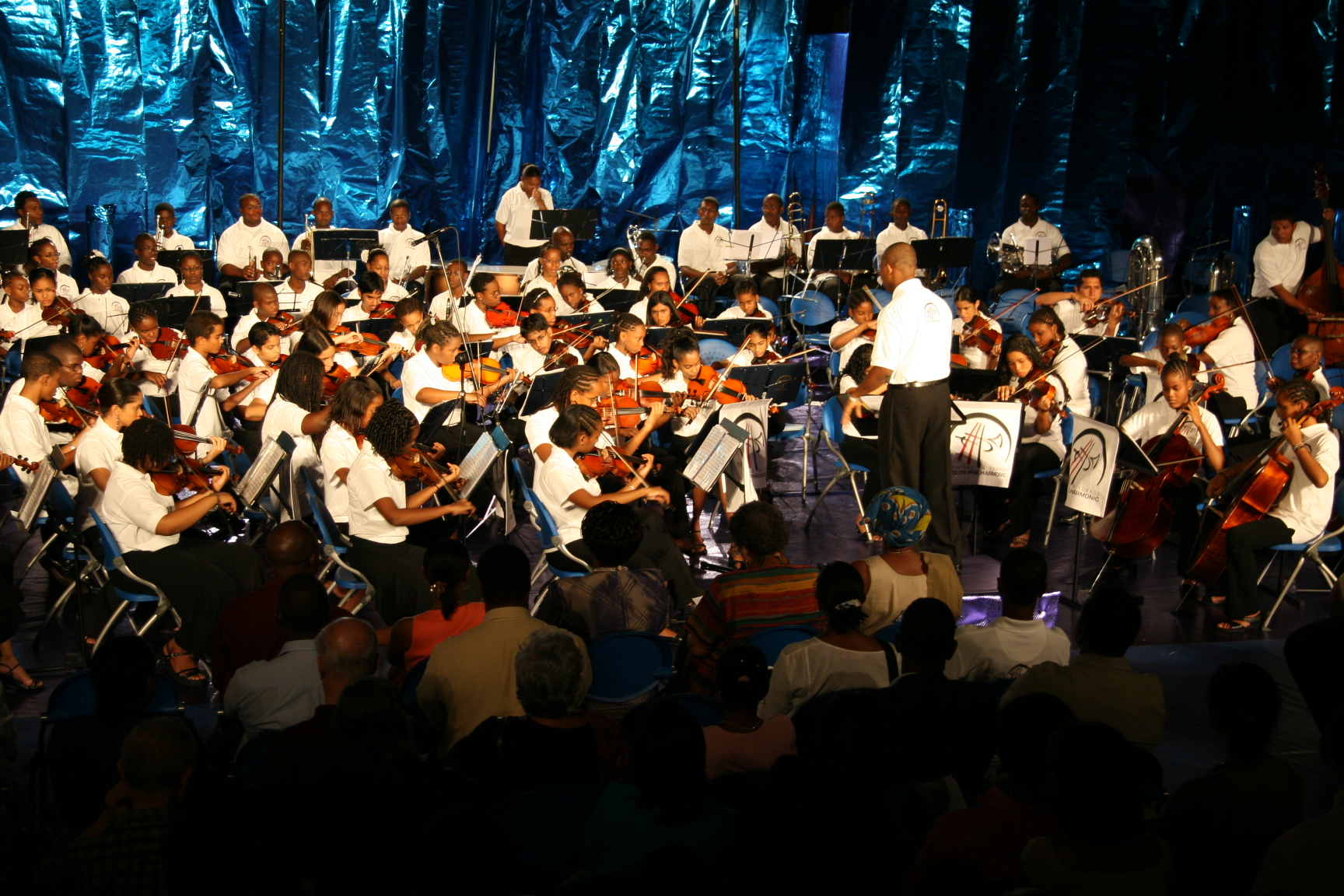

Background information
- Also known as: SACO; SACO-TTYP
- Origin: St Augustine, Trinidad
- Genres: Classical
- Occupation: Symphony orchestra
- Years active: 1999-present

The St. Augustine Orchestra is a nonprofit, semi-professional youth chamber orchestra based in St. Augustine, Trinidad.

== Overview ==
The St. Augustine Chamber Orchestra (SACO) is a non-profit organization founded in 1999 by Mr. Kenneth Listhrop, a music educator and conductor. It began with one student, Celeste Jules (Attorney at Law), and has grown into a group of approximately two hundred students consisting of three major divisions: children’s junior, intermediate orchestras, and an advanced youth orchestra.

== Founder ==
Kenneth Listhrop (M.Ed.) was a member, chairman and conductor of the former National Youth Orchestra of Trinidad and Tobago. He taught for eighteen years at the University School of St. Augustine and eight years at the International School of Port of Spain. While at the University School he embarked on a program to recruit young string students from the school for the National Youth Orchestra. The orchestra grew initially from one student (Celeste Jules) to nine students from the University School, Baker Street, St. Augustine. They were also the first students recruited for the fledgling National Youth Orchestra. By December 1999 when the orchestra was formally launched, the membership had grown to nineteen string players.

Listhrop acts in various capacities within the organization such as founder, visionary, teacher, accompanist, arranger, conductor, music director and friend of the many young musicians that join the orchestra. He is a Licentiate of the Royal Schools of Music, London (L.R.S.M) with an advanced certificate in violin performance from the Royal Schools of Music London. In 2007, Listhrop tendered his resignation from the International School of Port of Spain in order to fully commit himself to the further growth and development of the St. Augustine Chamber Orchestra and the Trinidad and Tobago Youth Philharmonic Orchestra.

== Trinidad and Tobago Youth Philharmonic ==
In 2006, the board of SACO decided to partner with Bon Air High School Music Foundation led by Leslie Clement, Glorious Sounds of Tobago led by Pastor David Elder and several music schools across the country towards the formation of the Trinidad and Tobago Youth Philharmonic, one of the few and largest youth orchestras in the Caribbean chain of islands.

Listhrop founded the Trinidad & Tobago Youth Philharmonic Orchestra (TTYP) as wind, brass, and percussion students were added to the pre-existing stringed instruments by recruiting young music students from several music schools across Trinidad and Tobago including Glorious Sounds from Tobago. Another source of students for the orchestra is the St. George's College, Barataria, and the Bishop Anstey High School East and Trinity College East, Trinity, where a collaboration between the school's music program and the orchestra led to the award of twenty scholarships to students from the schools as part of an effort to expand the woodwind and brass sections of the orchestra.

While the initial focus was on the playing of string instruments (violin, viola, cello and double bass) the organization has been able to diversify towards the inclusion of woodwind, brass, and percussion instruments with the objective of the formation of a full symphonic orchestra and ultimately an adult orchestra.

== Venezuelan collaboration ==
Each year the orchestra holds a collaborative workshop in August with tutors from The State System for Youth and Children’s Orchestras and Choirs (FESNOJIV) Venezuela.

== Past performances ==
The St. Augustine Chamber Orchestra has two major performances annually. They have been actively performing year-round in Classical, Pop, and Christmas Concerts. Each year, these performances have different themes.

== Achievements ==
SACO has had several achievements over the years. These include:

- Forming the largest Youth Philharmonic Orchestra in the English-speaking Caribbean.
- The only orchestra in the Caribbean to perform the full score for the New World Symphony.
- Performing with cellist Luis Leguia of the Boston Symphony Orchestra and Luis and Clark.
- Performing with Kanye West at a local concert.
- Performing for the spouses of Commonwealth Heads of Government.
- Performing at the opening of The Beacon Trinidad and Tobago Cycling Festival.
- Performing with soloist Andrew Sords
