= Naparima Girls' High School =

Coordinates: 10.28085°N 61.46192°W

Naparima Girls High School
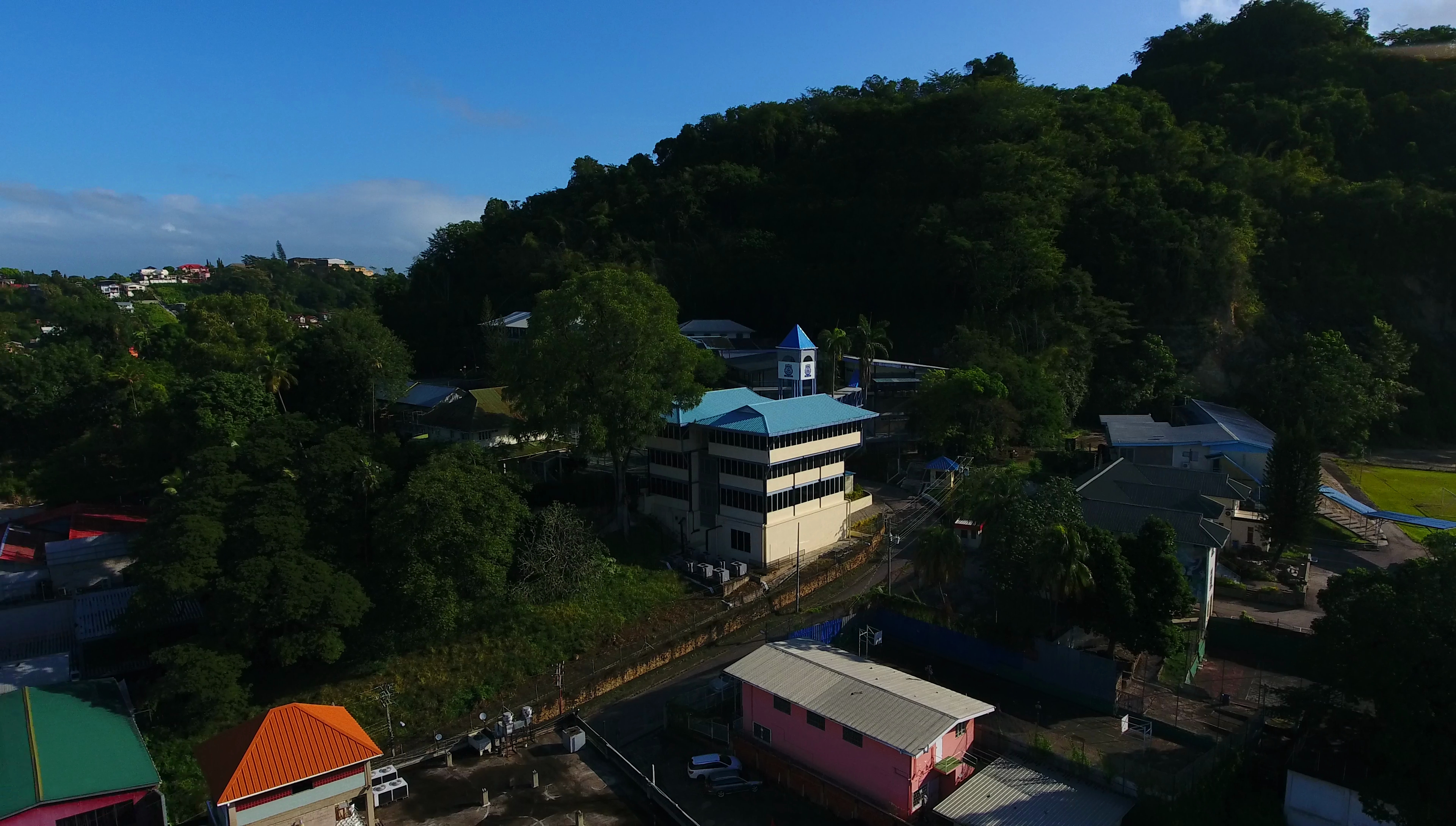

Location
- 4 La Pique Road; San Fernando, 601418; Trinidad and Tobago

Information
- Type: Secondary school
- Motto: Non nobis solum sed omnibus ("Not for ourselves only but for others")
- Religious affiliation: Presbyterian
- Established: 12 January 1912
- Founder: Dr. Fulton Coffin
- School board: Presbyterian Secondary School Board
- School district: Victoria West
- School code: 160035
- Principal: Karen Bally (Ag.)
- Years: 7
- Gender: Female
- Age range: 12–18
- Hours in school day: 6.5
- Website: http://naparimagirls.edu.tt

Naparima Girls' High School is an all-girls high school in San Fernando, Trinidad and Tobago. The school was founded in 1912 by Rev Dr. Fulton Coffin to complement the education offered to boys by Naparima College. It is located on La Pique Hill (part of San Fernando Hill) which overlooks San Fernando.

== History ==
In 1912, the school opened with its first 22 pupils in a small classroom on Coffee Street, San Fernando with Miss Edith Doyle as the first Headmistress and the sole teacher. When Miss Doyle retired six months later, she was succeeded by Miss Marion Outhit M.A., a graduate of Dalhousie University.

In 1914, With the school's popularity growing, a small dormitory was created in an existing structure on Coffee Street to house ten girls with Miss Mary John becoming the first matron.

In 1916, Miss Outhit was succeeded in 1916, by Miss Grace Beattie, an Arts graduate of the University of Toronto and a deaconess of the Presbyterian Church. Miss Beattie's vision for the school was one of holistic education, aiming to build sound character through all-round development.

1925 – Planted the now iconic tamarind tree. It was in 1925, that NGHS attained the official status of Secondary School and the first Senior Cambridge class consisting of two students sat the external examination.

== Motto and Hymn ==
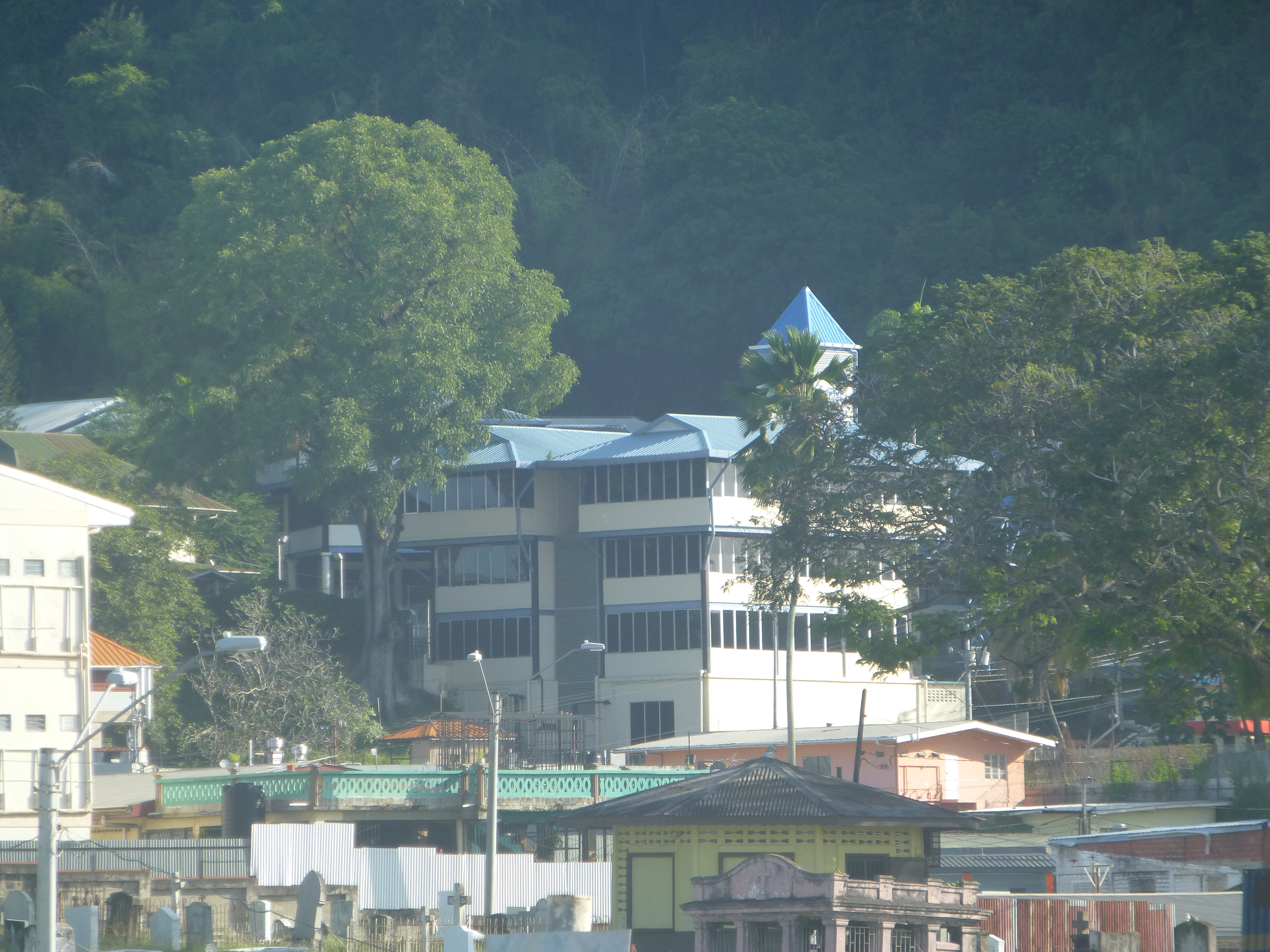
Naparima Girls' High School

The school's motto is Non-nobis solum sed Omnibus which is Latin for Not for ourselves only but for Others.

In keeping with these words to live by, all students are required to complete forty hours of community service during the first four years (forms 1–4) of their secondary education at the school. After these compulsory hours, students are free to add more.

The school hymn is Youth Undaunted.

== Principals ==
- Miss Edith Doyle (1912–1913)
- Miss Marion Outhit (1913–1916)
- Miss Grace Beattie (1916–1917)
- Miss Adella Archibald (1917–1927)
- Miss Constance Young (1927–1928)
- Miss Grace Beattie (1939–1950)
- Miss Margaret Scrimgeour (1950–1964)
- Miss Beulah Meghu (1964–1984) [First Trinidadian Principal]
- Mrs. Mavis Lee Wah (1984–1986)
- Mrs. Jean Bahadur (1984– 2000)
- Mrs. Patricia Ramgoolam (2000–2012)
- Mrs. Carolyn Bally-Gosine (2012–2020)
- Mrs. Karen Bally (2020–present)

The years 1928 to 1939 saw four changes of Acting Principal: Mrs. Irene Thompson-Kerster in 1928, Miss Margaret Scrimgeour in 1930, Mrs. Maude Howell-Dales in 1932 and Miss Bessie Bentley in 1936.

== House system ==
The students are placed into five teams called 'houses'. The houses compete against each other in sporting, arts and cultural activities. All houses vie for the title "Best House" which is named at the end of every school year. Houses gain points and merits which are totalled, the highest scoring house receives the award. Each house was named after a prominent female figure and also assigned a colour. The houses and their colours are:

- Archibald – blue (Adella Archibald)
- Cavell – green (Edith Cavell)
- Curie – red (Marie Curie)
- Keller – yellow (Helen Keller)
- Scrimgeour – purple (Margaret Scrimgeour)

== Entrance ==
Entry into the institution is done after writing the Secondary Entrance Assessment.

== Notable alumni ==
- Dionne Brand – poet, novelist, essayist and documentarian
- Gillian Lucky, politician and lawyer
- Anna Mahase CMT – former Principal of SAGHS Teaching Service Commissioner
- Jean Ramjohn-Richards – former First Lady of Trinidad and Tobago.
- Sparkle L. Sooknanan - United States federal judge
- Shakuntala Haraksingh Thilsted – Winner of the 2021 World Food Prize

== See also ==
- List of schools in Trinidad and Tobago
