= Presentation College, Chaguanas =

Presentation College Chaguanas

Location
- Corner Yves and Rene Streets; Chaguanas; Trinidad and Tobago
- 10°31′11″N 61°24′44″W

Information
- School type: Government Assisted, Denominational Roman Catholic
- Motto: Domine Nos Dirige (Lord Show Us The Way)
- Denomination: Roman Catholic
- Patron saint: Blessed Edmund Rice
- Established: March 1959
- Founder: Canon Max Murphy
- Status: Open
- School board: The School Management & Advisory Committee(SMAC) Mr. V.Pilgrim, Chairman
- School district: Caroni Educational District
- Authority: Archdiocesan Education Board of Management
- Principal: Dr. Rene Wihby
- Chaplain: Fr. Dereck Anthon, Chaguanas R.C. Church
- Teaching staff: 40
- Gender: Male
- Age range: 11-19
- Enrollment: 634
- Sixth form students: 160
- Classes: 21
- Average class size: 35
- Classes offered: 21 approx
- Hours in school day: 6.5
- Houses: Finbar, Aquinas, Chaconia, Ibis
- Colours: Brown, burgundy, blue
- Song: Virgin of the Presentation
- Sports: Football, Cricket, Track and Field, Badminton
- Nickname: Pres, Pres Chag, PCC
- National ranking: Number 1
- Website: Presentation College Chaguanas

Presentation College, Chaguanas is a Roman Catholic secondary school in Chaguanas, Trinidad and Tobago and is the brother school of Presentation College, San Fernando.

== History ==
The Endeavour estates donated the land on which the school is. With the concern for the welfare of underprivileged youths, Canon Max Murphy founded the school with the permission of the then Archbishop of Port of Spain, Count Finbar Ryan. It was first known as "the parish school," but was later renamed Pamphilian High School, and then The College of St. Phillip and St. James. In 1959, the school was established at its current location, and management was taken over by the Presentation Brothers who continued to run the school until 1997. On 19 March 1959, the then Education and Culture Minister, Dr. Patrick Solomon, formally commissioned the school. On 4 October 2009, the school celebrated its 50th anniversary.

Although the school is primarily Roman Catholic, it has a diverse student body of different religions. Hosted and organized by the students, the school holds various religious celebrations annually, such as Diwali, Eid, and Christmas.

== House system ==
The school has four houses:

- Aquinas (after St. Thomas Aquinas patron saint of schools)
- Chaconia (the national flower),
- Finbar (after former Roman Catholic Archbishop of Port of Spain, Count Finbar Ryan, who donated the Virgin Mary statue which stands at the center of the school)
- Ibis

== See also ==
- List of schools in Trinidad and Tobago
