= Presentation College, San Fernando =

Coordinates: 10.27869°N 61.46105°W

Presentation College

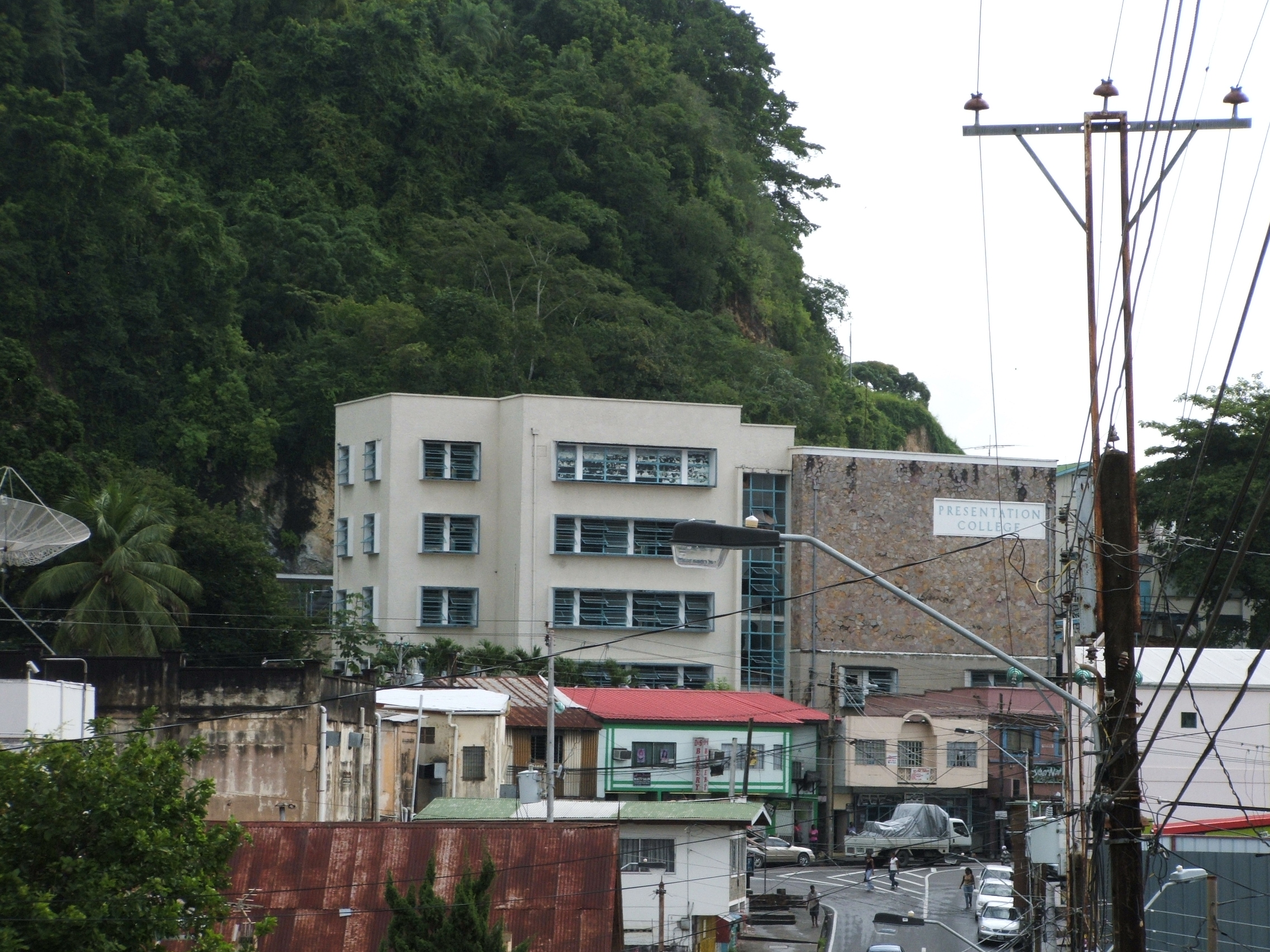
- Presentation College San Fernando captured from Lord Street, San Fernando
- 32-34 Coffee Street; San Fernando; Trinidad and Tobago

Information
- School type: Government Assisted, Male Secondary School
- Motto: Laudate Pueri Dominum (Latin) (Literal: Boys Praise The Lord)
- Denomination: Roman Catholic
- Patron saints: Blessed Virgin Mary; Blessed Edmund Rice
- Established: 1948
- School district: Victoria Educational District
- Principal: Mr. Nicholas Cooper-Neaves
- Age: 11 to 20
- Classes: 26
- Average class size: 31
- Hours in school day: 6.5
- Houses: St. Andrew, St. Augustine, St. Barnabas, St. Bede, St. Gregory, St. Winifred
- Colors: Green and White
- Song: O Lady of Presentation
- Affiliation: Roman Catholic Board of Trinidad and Tobago
- Website: presmen.org

Presentation College San Fernando is a selective, government-assisted Roman Catholic Boys’ Secondary School located in San Fernando, Trinidad and Tobago. It claims to be the first Catholic secondary school in South Trinidad, having been established around 1930 in the basement of San Fernando Presbytery. It relocated to the Colony Buildings at La Pique (near Spring Vale, and north of Coffee) in 1931. Originally named St. Benedict's College, the name was changed in 1948 when management of the school was assumed by the Presentation Brothers.

== Present day ==
Based on the academic achievements of its graduates and overall success of its alumni, Presentation College, San Fernando is considered by many to be one of the premier secondary schools in Trinidad and Tobago. Each year, several students are awarded National Scholarships, which are essentially highly selective merit-based grants earned by students who have attained the highest grades in the Advanced Level Examinations taken by students upon the completion of a seven-year secondary education curriculum. The top scholarship in Trinidad & Tobago, known as the "President's Medal", has been won on several occasions by Presentation College, San Fernando students. President's Medals are also awarded at the CSEC level.

Typically, students matriculate at age eleven and pursue the curriculum through either the age of sixteen or eighteen. Unlike other Caribbean islands, Trinidad and Tobago has a rigorous exam for students to get from primary education to high school education. Primary school student are given four choices of secondary schools and depending on their results in the exam, they will either be accepted to the country's top secondary schools or lower tiered schools. Presentation College maintains a high academic standard; the college receives the first five percentile of male students in the island and graduates are awarded a great number of scholarships.

=== Facilities ===
Presentation College, San Fernando houses a number of facilities that fit the secondary education curriculum. These include 5 Science Laboratories, an Information Technology Lab, 2 Lecture/ Conference Rooms, a Technical Drawing Lab, a Library, Music Rooms and an Art Room. Additional facilities include a football field, cricket pitch, tennis court, squash court and basketball court. The swimming pool is leased by the school and can be accessed by the public.

=== Campus ===
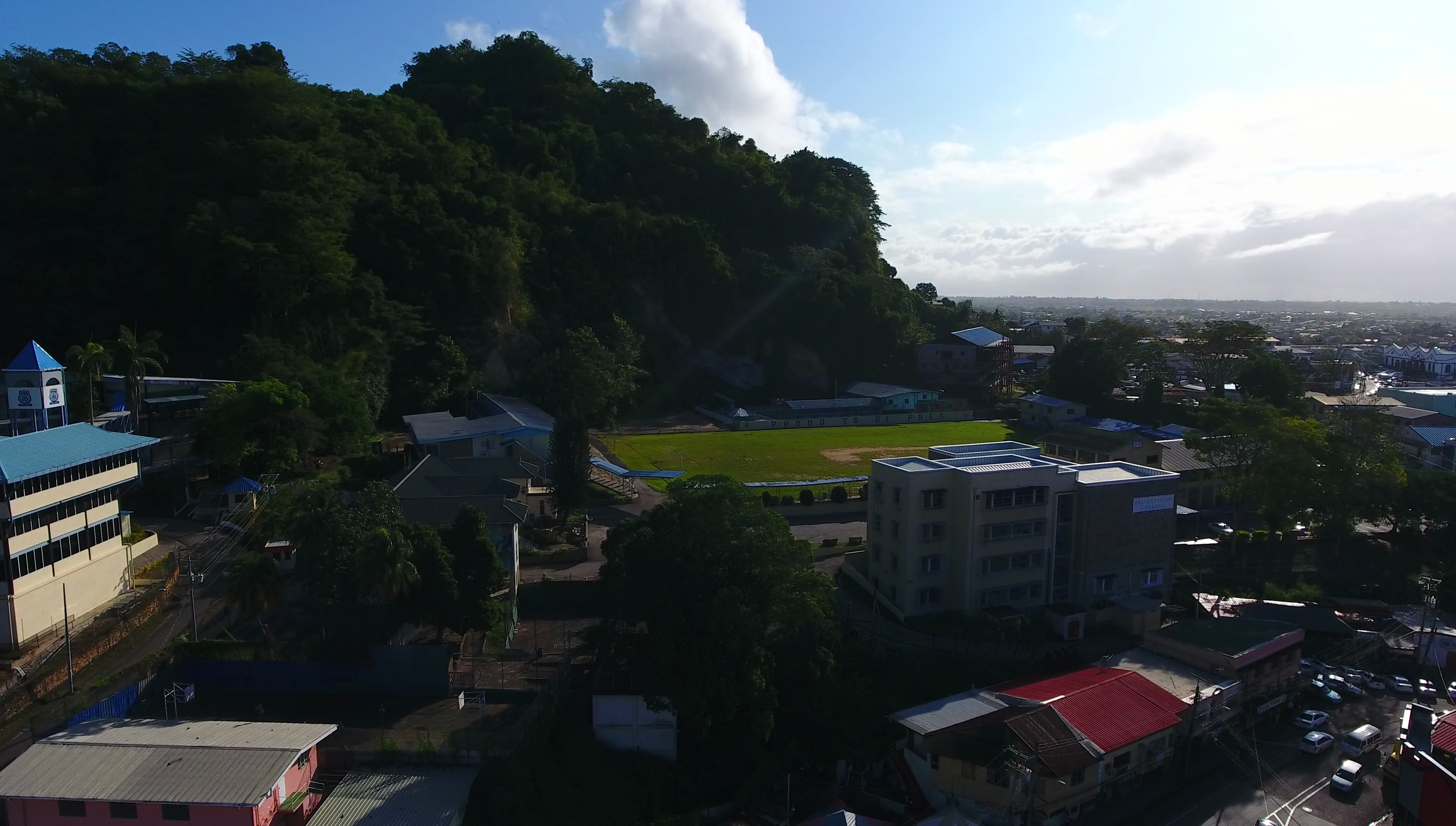
Presentation College campus

Presentation College stands tall at the foot of the San Fernando Hill, boarded by Coffee Street to the west, Carib Street to the south, La Pique Road to the north and the hill to the east. The main college entrance is located on Carib Street. Another gate, seldom used, is located on Coffee Street. A third gate separates the connected compound of Naparima Girls High School from the college but provides access to students to cross to either side. Upon entry via the Carib Street entrance, a visitor is met by the Benedictine Block which houses eight classrooms, the office lobby, offices of the principal, vice principal and deans, a staff room and a cafeteria. Almost perpendicular to this block is another building which accommodates the art room, washroom facilities, showers and storage. Underneath is the 'garage' and is out of bounds to all students. Adjoining this are the music rooms, the Pan Theatre and the conference room.

Seen from a vast distance, the Bro. Browne Block still remains the college's most imposing building, dominating Lower Coffee Street. This five-storey wing houses eleven classrooms, the Information Technology Laboratory, the lecture room and the auditorium. The auditorium is utilised for college activities such as assemblies, Mass (due to its Roman Catholic influence), lectures etc. as well as for indoor sporting events like badminton, gymnastics and table tennis. The northernmost building is the Bro. Jerome Block, which possesses Lower and Upper 6 classes, the Physics/Chemistry/Biology Laboratories, the library, the Technical Drawing Room, the Accounting Room, the Book Room, Form 6 Deans' Offices and washroom facilities. To the rear of this building, one can find the gate which permits access into the Naparima Girls High School compound. This building is strictly out of bounds to lower school students who must be accompanied by a teacher to gain access to the facilities. Next to the aforementioned building is the Brothers' House, which formerly served as residence for the Presentation Brothers but is now occupied by the College Chapel and Language Rooms. Plans have been made to incorporate a gymnasium into the building, however this project remains under scrutiny and review.

The field is located at the heart of the school and constitutes the largest portion of the compound. The cricket pitch is found at the south-eastern corner of the campus while the tennis and basketball courts are located at the western end. These facilities are to only be used during timetabled Physical Education sessions, the luncheon intervals and after school hours and also serve as training grounds for the school's Presentation Lions sports teams.

=== Milestones ===
- 1947 The Presentation Brothers came to Trinidad.
- 1948 The Benedictine Monks handed over St. Benedict's College to the Presentation Brothers on January 12. Presentation College started with 400 students. Bro. Livinus Kelly was the first principal and served until 1952.
- 1950 GCE Advanced Level introduced.
- 1952 First distinctions at the Advanced Level examinations were recorded. Bro. Liam Dromey was appointed Principal.
- 1953 Bro. Bartholomew Browne was appointed Principal.
- 1956 The Bro. Browne Block, commonly known as The New Block and Auditorium, constructed.
- 1957 Bro. Jerome Kelly was appointed Principal.
- 1958 First Island and National Scholarship in Mathematics.
- 1963 First Jerningham Gold Medal awarded nationally was won by Presentation College.
- 1963-1972 The college won 19 of the 40 1st places & 15 of the 40 2nd places nationally. The Gold Medal was won 6 times. Bro. Jerome Kelly was presented with the keys to the Borough of San Fernando. This period is often referred to as the Golden Era.
- 1966-1967 Roy Chong Kit created history by winning the Gold Medal twice. He was not yet 16.
- 1969 Bro. Anslem O'Callaghan was appointed principal.
- 1970 Bro. Matthew Feheney was transferred to San Fernando as principal. During his term of office the daily morning assembly was introduced. After 25 years of dedicated care and leadership under the Brothers, in 1973, the Jubilee year, the college won both the Jerningham Gold (Kevin Granger) and Silver Medals (Floyd Chadee) in the same year! There were also three National Scholarship Winners: Gary Roberts- 1st in Modern Studies, Larry Homer- 1st in Math and Harry Mungalsingh- 2nd in Math.
- 1975 Michael Samuel, the first local Principal, was appointed.
- 1980-2002 Reeza Mohammed wins the President's Gold Medal in 1998.
- 1990-1991 South Intercol Football Champions.
- 2002 Brother Michael retires.
- 2003 Presentation Brothers handed over Management of two Colleges to the R.C. Archdiocesan Education Board of Management.
- 2004 Errol Jaikaransingh appointed principal. First lay Catholic principal.
- 2006-2007
- - 5 Top Ten World Rankings.
- - Mathieu Ramsawak- President's Gold Medal for Business.
- - South Intercol Football Champions.
- - Mrs. Carol Glenn-Aimey appointed as vice principal.
- 2008 - 2009
- - 60th Anniversary.
- - CXC's Most Outstanding Candidate in Mathematics 2008 - Matthew Maharaj
- - International Mathematics Olympiad Bronze Winner- Chandresh Ramlagan.
- 2009 CXC's Most Outstanding Candidate in Environmental Science 2009 - Kiron Neale
- 2010
- - CXC awards the Dennis Irvine Award for the Most Outstanding Candidate in the Caribbean in CAPE 2010 to Nicholas Sammy. Consequently, Presentation College San Fernando also receives CXC's School of the Year Award, received by Principal Mr Errol Jaikaransingh the CXC Regional Awards Ceremony in the Turks & Caicos Islands.
- - Trinidad and Tobago's first Silver Medal at the International Mathematics Olympiad (IMO) was copped by Kerry Shastri Singh.

-Trinidad and Tobago's first and to date only gold medal at the Youth Olympic Games - Christian Homer- swimming (50m backstroke) Singapore

- 2011
- - President's Gold Medal- Kerry Shastri Singh.
- - CXC awards the Dennis Irvine Award for the Most Outstanding Candidate in the Caribbean in CAPE 2011 to Kerry Shastri Singh. Consequently, Presentation College San Fernando also receives CXC's School of the Year Award, received by Principal Mr Errol Jaikaransingh the CXC Regional Awards Ceremony in Trinidad & Tobago. Kerry Singh also was awarded the CXC's Most Outstanding Candidate in Natural Sciences and Most Outstanding Candidate in Mathematics in CAPE 2011, claiming three of CXC's prestigious Regional Awards in one year.
- 2013 Mr. Dexter Charles Mitchell appointed Principal.
- - President's Medal Gold (CSEC)- Riyád Khan.
- - President's Medal Silver (CSEC)- David Craig
- 2017 CXC awards the Dennis Irvine Award for the Most Outstanding Candidate in the Caribbean in CAPE 2017 to Joel Kissoon. Consequently, Presentation College San Fernando also receives CXC's School of the Year Award, received by Principal Mr Dexter Mitchell the CXC Regional Awards Ceremony in St. Kitts & Nevis.
- President's Gold Medal (CSEC) - Kavesh Sugremsingh
- 2019 Intercol Champions

== Sports ==
Presentation College, San Fernando has a talented football team, and has produced several players who would later represent Trinidad and Tobago Football at national level (senior or junior age group), as well as collegiate and professional teams throughout the United States and Europe. Notable players include Avery John, who played at the 2006 FIFA World Cup. Cricket is also popular in the college; Oscar Durity, Trinidad and Tobago opening batsman of the early 1970s, attended the school. Presentation College won 26 South-Intercol Championships, the most recent being won in 2016 against the talented Shiva Boys.

== Organisation ==
In academic structure the college is organised into three blocks. In the lower school, students range in age from eleven to fourteen. In middle school, students range in age from fifteen to sixteen. In upper school, students range in age from seventeen to nineteen. The college is organised along intramural lines. Upon entry to the college, students are assigned to one of several houses, and remain in their assigned house though their tenure at the school. The house system serves as an organisational basis for intra-college sporting competition as well as for participation in other aspects of college life. The system was introduced during the years of Brother Livinus Kelly's principalship. The houses are St. Andrew (yellow), St. Augustine (light blue), St. Barnabas (red), St. Bede (green), St. Gregory (dark blue and gold), and St. Winifred (maroon/purple).

The prefect system provides a supplemental basis for the administration of the college. Prefects exist in two forms. The first variety, college prefects, come exclusively from the sixth form or most senior students. They enforce adherence to the college's code of conduct systemwide and are accountable to the principal. The other variety of prefects are referred to as class prefects. Class prefects monitor conduct within their particular form or classroom and are accountable to the form master or mistress.

=== Admission policy ===
Admission to college is determined by performance on an examination, known as the Secondary Entrance Assessment (SEA). The SEA comprises three papers that must be attempted by all candidates; creative writing, mathematics and language arts. The precursor to the SEA was the Common Entrance Examination (CEE), which mirrored the SEA in several significant respects. Presentation College tends to be an institution of first or second choice of the four prospective institutions each exam is required to list in preferential order of interest prior to the exam. The four preferences are drawn from the totality of secondary institutions nationwide. Students may apply and be permitted entry into the college at the Form 6 level if they achieve high levels of performance at the CSEC examinations. However, there are instances of students being permitted to transfer into the college at any point due to academic excellence or great ability in sports.

=== Curriculum ===
Students of the college pursue a course of instruction leading to external examination under the authority of the Caribbean Examinations Council (CXC). After five years at the college (and in selected instances, four years), students sit the Caribbean Secondary Education Certification (CSEC) examination in various fields of study.

The CXC was established in 1972 by agreement of regional governments seeking an effective and functional model through which to provide and assess a secondary education curriculum. As a body, the council has an operative relationship with the University of the West Indies and the governments of fifteen participating territories aside from that of the Republic of Trinidad and Tobago.

The CSEC examinations are the accepted and internationally recognised equivalent of the GCE or General Certificate of Education Ordinary Level examinations they replaced. For decades, examinees at Pres took GCEs set by the University of Cambridge Local Examinations Syndicate, now known as University of Cambridge International Examinations. However, a preceding generation of students took a version of Cambridge examination known as the Cambridge School Certificate, a precursor of contemporary GCE O-levels.

Students at the college first sat CXC exams (CSEC) in 1979. At that time, the subjects available for examination under CXC existed in limited number. The first group of examinees submitted to examination in the areas of English, mathematics and geography, while also taking Cambridge GCEs in these three subjects and other subjects. Gradually, the range of subjects offered by the Caribbean Examinations Council expanded until CSEC exams came to replace the traditional Cambridge GCE exams completely.

In everyday parlance, CSEC examinations are commonly referred to as CXCs because from 1979 to 1998 they constituted the only form of examination offered by the Caribbean Examinations Council. However, the Council later developed the Caribbean Advanced Proficiency Examinations (CAPE) examinations to replace the British Advanced level exams. Presentation College began to enlist students for the CAPE examinations instead of the GCE Advanced Level examinations in 2007. Now, CAPE examinations are taken by students who have completed their standard secondary education (the CSEC) and who seek to continue their studies, beyond the minimum age for completion of compulsory education. Students who wish to sit for the CAPE usually possess CSEC or an equivalent certification.

== Notable alumni ==
- Faris Al-Rawi: Former Attorney General of Trinidad and Tobago
- Anthony Carmona: Former President of Trinidad and Tobago, Justice-Elect to the International Criminal Court in the Hague (withdrew upon being elected as Head of State of Trinidad and Tobago)
- Keith Clifford: Physician & Fmr. Television Host
- Henry Ian Cusick: Actor, Director
- Anthony Lucky: Fmr. Justice of the Supreme Court of the Republic of Trinidad and Tobago
- Patrick Manning: former Prime Minister of Trinidad and Tobago (1991-1995 & 2001-2010)
- Machel Montano: Soca Artiste
- Basdeo Panday: former Prime Minister of Trinidad and Tobago (1995–2001)
- Pt. Dr. Rampersad Parasram: SDMS Dharmacharya of Trinidad and Tobago; former medical doctor and politician
- Randall Mitchell: Former Minister of Tourism, Culture and the Arts of Trinidad and Tobago, former member of Parliament for San Fernando East.

== See also ==
- Presentation Brothers
- List of schools in Trinidad and Tobago
