= Bishop Anstey High School East =

Location
- 35-51 College Avenue, Millennium Lakes, 340319 Trincity; Trinidad and Tobago
- Coordinates: 10.632°N 61.343°W

Information
- Type: private -girls school
- Motto: "Selflessly Serving Our Community"
- Patron saint: St. Clare
- Established: 2001
- Principal: Kheisha Nicholls-De Souza
- Colors: Red, Black and Gold
- Website: batce.edu.tt

Bishop Anstey High School East (BAHSE) is a private secondary school for girls, located in Trincity, Trinidad.

== History ==
The school was established as part of a wider project initiative of the Anglican Diocese in Trinidad and Tobago for the provision of secondary education. The Church pooled is resources with the Government and private sector organizations, whilst the land and construction services for the project were procured from Home Construction Limited.

Since its establishment in 2001, BAHSE has promoted the tenets of Anglicanism and Christian values as a pathway to enriching the scholastic, moral and spiritual lives of students, with St Clare of Assisi being the Patron Saint. BAHSE is one of eight secondary schools (8) under the purview of the Bishop Anstey Association.

The school shares a campus of nineteen acres of land space with Trinity College East and collectively, these two schools are referred to as Bishop Anstey & Trinity College East (BATCE). Pride is taken in maintaining a clean, safe and positive environment conducive to teaching and learning and the all-round development of students.

As a seven-year school, BATCE prepares students for the Caribbean Examinations Council (CXC) Caribbean Secondary Education Certificate known as “CSEC” at 5th Form and the Caribbean Advanced Proficiency Examinations (CAPE) level examinations at 6th Form level.

BATCE celebrated its ten-year anniversary in 2011 by hosting a series of celebratory activities, including its annual Carnival, Soca 4 U.

BAHSE's current Principal is Kheisha Nicholls-De Souza.

== Subjects ==
Art-

- Graphic Arts
- Visual Arts
- Technical Drawing
- Theatre Arts
- Music

Business-

- Principles of Accounts
- Principles of Business
- Economics

English-

- English A
- Literature (English-B)

Foreign Languages-

- French
- Spanish

Technology-

- Information Technology
- Technology Education
- Industrial Technology: Electrical and Electronic Engineering

Library-

- Information Literacy Skills

Mathematics-

- Mathematics
- Additional Mathematics

Sciences-

- Agricultural Sciences
- Integrated Science
- Chemistry
- Physics
- Biology
- Human and Social Biology

Social Sciences-

- Geography
- Social Studies
- History
- Business
- Accounts
- Economics

Religion-

- Religious Education

Physical/Health Class-

- Physical and Health Science/Education

== Extra curricular activities ==
- Archery
- Robotics
- Basketball
- Choir
- Cricket
- Drama
- Environmental Club
- Folk/ Ballroom Dancing
- Football
- Four-H Club
- Hockey
- Interact Club
- Karate
- Netball
- Pan
- Photography
- String Ensemble
- Swimming
- Tennis
- Track and Field
- Volleyball
- Board Games Club
- Chess Club
- President's Award Trinidad
