= Presentation Brothers =

International Catholic congregation

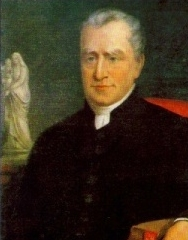
Blessed Edmund Ignatius Rice

The Congregation of Presentation Brothers (Latin: Fratres Presentationis Mariae; English: "Brothers of the Presentation of Mary"; abbreviated F.P.M.) is an international Catholic congregation of laymen founded in 1802 in Waterford, Ireland, by a local Irish businessman, Edmund Ignatius Rice, now Blessed Edmund Ignatius Rice. Presentation Brothers live and work in Ireland, England, US, Canada, Ghana, Nigeria, Zimbabwe, Zambia and Grenada with about 100 brothers throughout these countries.

The brothers take three promises—poverty, chastity and obedience—and live together in small groups called "communities". The motto of the congregation was adopted from that of the Jesuits: "Ad Majorem Dei Gloriam" or For the greater glory of god". Brothers bear the initials F.P.M. (Fratres Presentationis Mariae).

The expressed mission of the Presentation Brothers is to "form Christ in the young" and traditionally they have worked to achieve this through education. Today Presentation Brothers work in a wider range of ministries including with the homeless, elderly, disadvantaged youth and the Roma people. In 2007 the Presentation Brothers opened new missions in Slovakia and Nigeria and an advocacy office for the poor in Geneva.

== History ==
The Presentation Brothers were founded by Edmund Rice in the city of Waterford, Ireland in 1802.

=== Edmund Rice ===
Edmund Rice was born in the townland of Westcourt near the village of Callan in County Kilkenny on June 1, 1762. His parents, Robert and Margaret Tierney Murphy Rice, were prosperous farmers. The family spoke Irish but would also have spoken English in order to conduct their business affairs. Ireland in 1762, was under British rule and the anti-Catholic Penal Laws prevented a Catholic from receiving an education. Rice received his primary school education from a hedge school. These were illegal schools established by travelling teachers. The laws were relaxed at the time of Rice's childhood and eventually, he attended an academy in Kilkenny.

At the age of 17, Rice was apprenticed to his uncle, Michael Rice, in Waterford city. Waterford was one of the busiest ports in the world at the time, second only to Hamburg. Seven years later, Rice's uncle signed the business over to him. A shrewd businessman, Rice invested his growing fortune in land and property. At the age of 25, Rice married Mary Elliot, the daughter of a local businessman. Elliot was killed in a horse riding accident and the baby she was carrying was born with a handicap. The baby was christened Mary and Edmund's step-sister Joan took charge of looking after her.

After his wife's death, Rice became more religious and he developed a devotion to Saint Teresa of Jesus. He also became involved in charitable works and regularly visited the poor of Waterford providing financial assistance to those in need. In 1798, Rice helped the Presentation Sisters open a convent and school for girls in Waterford. Rice decided to try something similar for young boys. In 1800, he began to teach youngsters at his business premises in Barronstrand Street with the assistance of some volunteers. The following year, Rice converted some stables on New Street into a makeshift school. His friends and colleagues described it as an act of "mad folly". Two men, Thomas Grosvenor and Patrick Finn, arrived to help. The three men lived in temporary accommodation over the horse stable as they waited for a monastery to be built.

=== The congregations ===
In the early days, when Rice first began to attract followers to his way of life, these formed themselves into a small group of companions. They lived together in the community and began to follow an adaptation of the Presentation Sisters’ rule. The Holy See had already approved of this Rule when Edmund and his followers began to use their adaptation of it to guide their first steps along the path of religious life.

In 1832, the Rule of the Religious Brothers, approved by the pope, was adopted. As Superior General of a Pontifical Institute, Rice could now move brothers between dioceses without having to seek each local bishop's permission. The majority of brothers accepted the new Rule and went on to become the Congregation of Christian Brothers. Today there are Irish Christian Brothers in 17 different countries.

Brother Michael Augustine Riordan, and a few of the Cork Brothers decided to remain under the jurisdiction of local diocesan bishop and continued to live by the Presentation Rule. They became a Pontifical Institute in 1889. The Presentation Brothers have a particular devotion to Our Lady of Good Counsel.

== Expansion ==
In 1876, the first Presentation school outside Ireland opened in England. Like the Irish Christian Brothers, the Presentation Brothers have followed the missionary example of the great Irish missionaries Brendan and Colmcille, responding as they believe Edmund Rice would have, to different needs as they encounter them in different regions and different circumstances. Presentation Brothers College, Cork was founded in 1878.

The main foundations have been: US 1843; England 1876; Canada 1910; West Indies 1946; Ghana 1968; Peru 1969; Geneva 2007; Nigeria 2007; Slovakia 2007.

From 1991 along with other orders was involved in the Christian Formation Resource Centre (CFRC) in Cork, which developed into the Christian Leadership in Education Office (CLEO), which since 1993 has delivered postgraduate courses in education, in Cork (and from 1993 to 1996 in Limerick), validated by the University of Hull. Since 1995 CLEO has been solely run by the presentation order, and is based in Mardyke House, Cork.

The Leadership Education and Formation (L.E.A.F) Project from the Presentation Brothers is based at Mount St. Joseph's, Cork.

== Headquarters ==
The Presentation Brothers' Generalate is located at Mount St. Joseph, Blarney Street in Cork, Ireland, originally built as a House of Studies, it has been home to the brothers since 1892.

== Provinces ==
There are about 350 Presentation Brothers living in 22 communities in 7 countries around the world. The congregation is divided into three Provinces:

- Anglo-Irish Province (Ireland, England)
- Our Lady of the Americas Province (Canada, US, Grenada)
- Ghana Province (Ghana, Nigeria)

== Schools ==
- Presentation Brothers College, Cork, Ireland
- Coláiste an Spioraid Naoimh, Cork, Ireland
- Presentation College, Bray, Wicklow, Ireland
- St. Aloysius Grade School, Montreal, Canada
- Brebeuf College School, Toronto, Canada
- Coláiste Chríost Rí, Cork, Ireland
- Coláiste Mhuire, Cobh, Ireland
- Scoil Iosaef Naofa, Cobh, Ireland
- Presentation College, San Fernando, Trinidad
- Presentation Brothers College, Grenada
- Presentation College Chaguanas, Trinidad
- Presentation Secondary Miltown, Kerry, Ireland
- Scoil Chríost Rí, Cork
- Presentation College, Carlow

St Mary's College, Vigie, St. Lucia.

== Former schools ==
- Presentation College, Reading, England
- Presentation High School, Montebello, Quebec
- Verdun Catholic High School, Verdun, Quebec
- Daniel O'Connell School, Montreal, Quebec
- Sacred Heart Elementary School, Prince George, British Columbia
- Presentation College, Saint John, Barbados
- St Joseph's College Enniskillen, Northern Ireland
- Presentation College Glasthule, Leinster, [Ireland]

== Notable alumni ==
- Michael Bond, author of Paddington Bear series (Reading)
- Jonathan Bowden, political activist and orator (Reading)
- Joseph Boyden, author of "Three Day Road" and "Through Black Spruce" (Brebeuf)
- Marc Kielburger, co-founder of Me to We, Free the Children and Leaders Today (Brebeuf)
- John McGahern, author (Presentation College Leitrim)
- Patrick Manning, Prime Minister of Trinidad and Tobago (Pres San Fernando)
- Micheál Martin, former Taoiseach (Prime Minister) of Ireland (Coláiste Chríost Rí), he also taught in Presentation College. Cork.
- Cillian Murphy, actor (Pres Cork)
- Cardinal Cormac Murphy-O'Connor, former Archbishop of Westminster and former President of the Bishops' Conference of England and Wales (Reading & Cork)
- Seán Ó Faoláin, author and Short Story writer (Pres Cork)
- Joseph Kelly, Editor and CEO of the Universe Catholic newspaper (Reading)
- Michael O'Leary, Irish Tánaiste and former leader of the Irish Labour Party (Pres Cork)
- Mike Oldfield, musician (Reading)
- Basdeo Panday, former Prime Minister of Trinidad and Tobago (Pres San Fernando)
- Numerous Irish rugby players including Ronan O'Gara, Peter Stringer and Irish Coach Declan Kidney.
- Anthony Carmona, Current President of Trinidad and Tobago (Pres San Fernando)
- Jack Warner, Previous Vice President of FIFA (Pres Chaguanas)
- Lawrie Sanchez, footballer and football manager (Reading)
- Gerard Johnson, musician, composer and producer (Reading)
- Damian Thompson, Journalist and Associate Editor of the Spectator (Reading)
- Hon. Keith Claudius Mitchell, PhD (Current Prime Minister of Grenada) Presentation Brothers College Grenada
- Mr. Maurice Bishop, LLB (Deceased) Former Prime Minister of Grenada. Presentation Brothers College Grenada
