= Anna Mahase =

Trinidad and Tobago headteacher (1932/1933–2024)

Anna Mahase (1932/1933 – 24 May 2024) was a Trinidadian educator and administrator. She was principal of the St. Augustine Girls' High School in Trinidad and Tobago. She was the commissioner of teaching of the Republic of Trinidad and Tobago. She was noted for her service to education as well as to other public and charitable organisations.

== Early life and education ==
Mahase was born in the village of Guaico, Trinidad, to Kenneth Mahase and Anna Mahase (Sr.). Her mother was the first Indian woman to become a teacher in Trinidad and Tobago in 1918. Her father was headmaster and her mother a senior teacher at several Canadian Mission (CM) schools. Both played a role in developing early education in rural North East Trinidad.

Mahase attended the Guaico CM School (Guaico Presbyterian Primary School), followed by Naparima Girls' High School in San Fernando. Afterwards, she studied at Mount Allison University in New Brunswick, Canada, graduating with a BSc and BEd.

Mahase subsequently received an honorary degree of Doctor of Laws from Mount Allison University and another from the University of the West Indies.

== Career ==
After her studies, Mahase returned to Trinidad and Tobago and after she was appointed headteacher of St. Augustine Girls' High School. She was the first local woman to hold this post. Her achievements and ideas became the standard for many other secondary schools.

During her long service, Mahase received many awards and honours including the Medal of Merit (Gold) (1976) and the Chaconia Medal (Gold) (1990), and was selected in top 50 persons to receive in excellence in education and distinguished public service to commemorate the 50th anniversary of the independence of Trinidad and Tobago in 2012.

== Death ==
Mahase died at a private hospital in St Joseph, on 24 May 2024, at the age of 91.
