= Cowen Hamilton Secondary School =

School in Trinidad

Coordinates: 10.23053°N 61.32251°W

Information
- Motto: Our Task to Build
- Established: 16 January 1962; 63 years ago
- Head teacher: Mrs. Natalie Small
- Houses: London; Payne; Bell; Parkes

Cowen Hamilton Secondary School is a school in south Trinidad. Pronounced "Co-win", the school was founded on 16 January 1962 to provide education in the fifth company village, located near Princes Town and Moruga, Trinidad.

The need for education beyond the primary level led a group of seven visionaries to establish a secondary school. The group comprised members of the Baptist faith; F. W. Webb, K. Charles, T. Ayers, and pastors Chapman, Parkes, Bell, and Payne. The dream came to reality on 16 January 1962 when Trinidad and Tobago's only Baptist secondary school was born. The school was named after two pioneers in secular and religious education namely George Cowen and William Hamilton. George Cowen was a British missionary and educator who established missions in Princes' Town. Williams Hamilton was a local baptist pastor who led the fifth company Baptist church.

In 1966 Cowen Hamilton Secondary School became a government assisted secondary school. With the assistance of corporate grants received from British Petroleum, National Petroleum and contributions received from benefactors such as Mr. Sookdeo Ramroop, the school expanded rapidly. The Bell Multipurpose Hall was erected in 1989. Provision was made for administrative offices, improved library facilities, a computer science room, an audio-visual arts room, and an assembly area. The Kern Bungalow was demolished to make way for a new structure.

The curriculum includes Physical Sciences and Technical Vocation studies. Advanced studies (CAPE) started in 1979.

Cowen Hamilton Secondary School has participated in Young Leaders, Public Speaking, Drama Festival, and also performances in Parang and Music Festival.

(The history was adapted from "History Of Cowen", published in the school yearbook in 2007 by Ms. A McKell (past teacher))

== Principals ==
- Rev. Eric Payne
- Rev. Cranston W Bell
- Mr. Malcolm London
- Rev. Alan J. Parkes
- Mrs. Joycelyn Bobb
- Ms. Marlene Charles
- Mrs. Natalie Small (current)

== House System ==
The house system uses the names of past principals. There are four houses - London (Yellow), Payne (Red), Bell (Green) and Parkes (Blue). Every 2 years, Cowen Hamilton Secondary holds its Annual Inter-House Sports Day where students take part in different types of sports against other houses.

== Motto ==
Our Task To Build

== See also ==
- List of schools in Trinidad and Tobago
