= National Certificate of Secondary Education =

School examination in Trinidad and Tobago

The National Certificate of Secondary Education is an examination that is held at the last week of June for form 3 students in Trinidad and Tobago, for entry into the upper secondary system for students to choose subjects for the Caribbean Certificate of Secondary Education Exam offer by the Caribbean Examinations Council (CXC).

It was introduced in 2005, to replace the fourteen plus exam system for Junior Secondary Schools to enter the Senior Comprehensive school or a prestige school, according to the marks. It is multiple-choice question-based. The format for answering questions is based in both written, oral, and practical forms. The subjects are: Mathematics, English Language, Integrated Science, Physical Education, Spanish, Information & Communication Technology, Social Studies, Technology Education, Visual and Performing Arts,

== See also ==
- Education in Trinidad and Tobago
