= List of colleges and universities in Trinidad and Tobago =

This is a list of the Universities and other educational institutions in Trinidad and Tobago.

== Universities ==
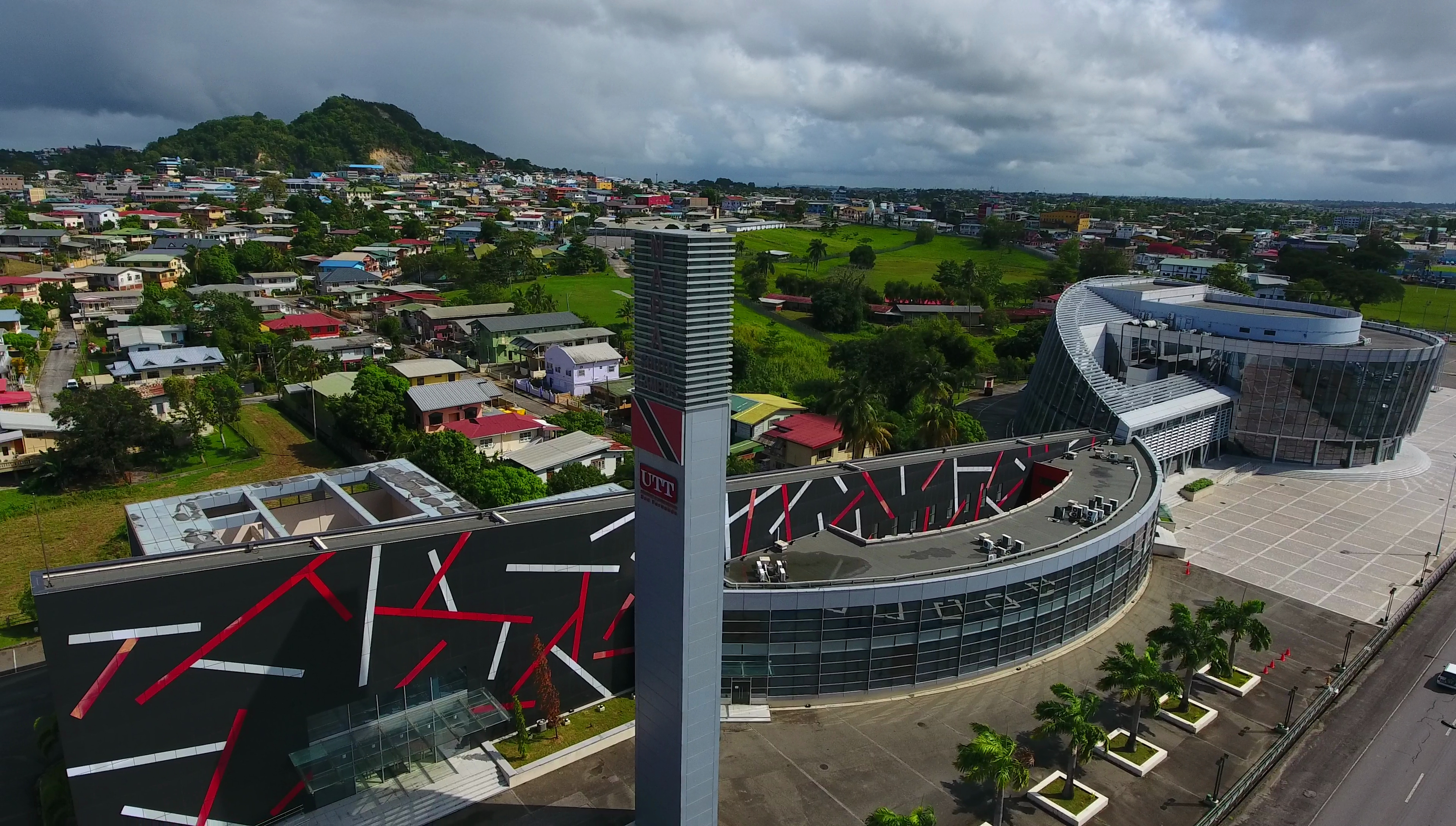
UTT South Campus, San Fernando

- University of the Southern Caribbean (previously known as Caribbean Union College)
- University of Trinidad and Tobago (UTT)
- University of the West Indies at St. Augustine

== Other educational institutes ==
- BorderCom International (BCI)
- Caribbean Nazarene College (CNC)
- Cipriani College of Labour and Cooperative Studies (CCLCS)
- College of Professional Studies (COPS)
- CTS College of Business and Computer Science
- College of Science, Technology & Applied Arts of Trinidad and Tobago (COSTAATT)
- Hugh Wooding Law School (HWLS)
- Professional Institute of Marketing and Business Studies Ltd. (PIMBS)
- Roytec
- SAM Caribbean Limited (SAM)
- School of Business and Computer Science (SBCS)
- School of International Travel and Languages (SITAL)
- Tobago Hospitality and Tourism Institute (THTI)
- Trinidad and Tobago Hospitality and Tourism Institute

== See also ==
- List of schools in Trinidad and Tobago
