= Dunross Preparatory School =

- West Moorings; Trinidad and Tobago

Information
- Motto: Learning for life
- Founded: 1955
- Principal: Karena Amow
- Enrollment: 421

Dunross Preparatory School is a private primary school located in Westmoorings, Trinidad and Tobago. It is the only school in Trinidad and Tobago that is owned by a cooperative society.

The school was founded in 1955 by Harry Ross. In 1978 land in Westmoorings was purchased for the school because it had grown. 17 new classrooms were built. Later the science lab, library, music, art and computer rooms were added. Today the school offers general subjects like reading, social studies, spelling, writing, maths, physical education, art, keyboarding, penmanship, literature, remedial, science, Spanish, music and computer studies. The classes are divided into infants and primary.
