= Westmoorings =

Neighborhood in west Trinidad and Tobago

Coordinates: 10.677°N 61.562°W

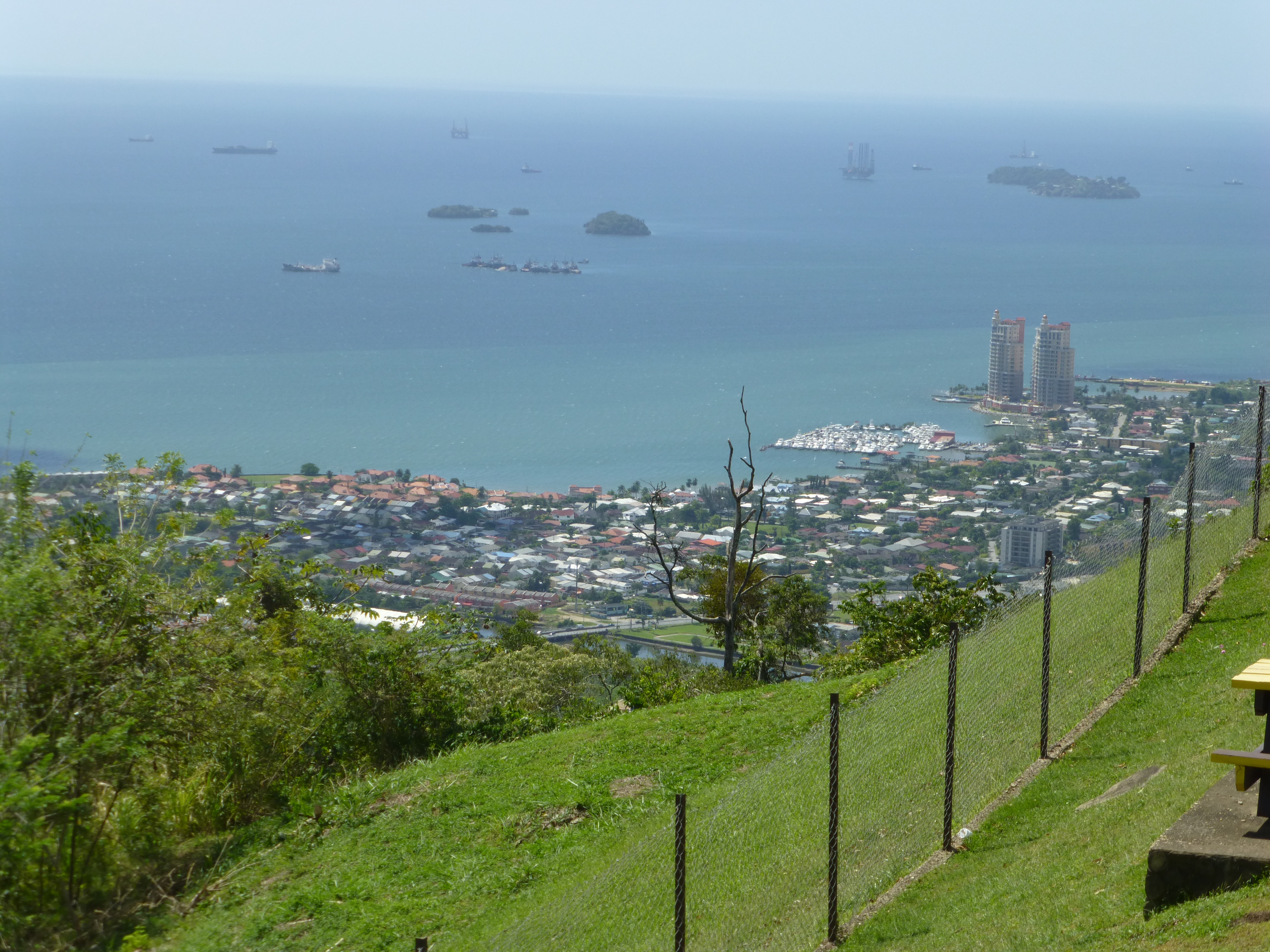
Westmoorings (left)

Westmoorings is a residential area in the region of Diego Martin on the island Trinidad, west of Port of Spain, the capital of Trinidad and Tobago. This suburb consists mainly of upper-class families and is generally known throughout the country for its upscale housing and expatriate population. This area mainly consists of small apartments and large upscale houses. It also has a few offshore moorings, a mall (The Falls at Westmall), a government college (St. Anthony's College), the International School of Port of Spain, and a private primary school, Dunross Preparatory School. It is bordering the sea and Diego Martin river.

== Notable residents ==
- Noor Hassanali, former President of Trinidad and Tobago (1987–1997)
- Zalayhar Hassanali, former First Lady of Trinidad and Tobago (1987–1997)
