= The British Academy of Port of Spain =

The British Academy

Location
- Coordinates: 10.6684°N 61.5218°W

Information
- Website: britishacademy.edu.tt

The British Academy is a private, co-ed, primary and secondary school in Port of Spain, Trinidad and Tobago established in 2006. It is certificated by Cambridge Assessment International Education.
