= International School of Port of Spain =

International school located in Trinidad and Tobago

Location
- 10.67881°N 61.55787°W

Information
- School type: International School
- Established: 1994
- Age: 3 to 18

The International School of Port of Spain is an international school in Westmoorings, Trinidad and Tobago. It is a private, co-educational day school offering prekindergarten through grade 12 classes. The school opened in September 1994.

== Students ==
The school has around 445 students. ISPS students have frequented the most prestigious universities in England, Canada and the United States. At the beginning of the 2022–23 school year, enrollment was 245. Of the total, 55 were U.S. citizens, 109 were host-country nationals and 81 were third-country nationals.

== Organization ==
The school is governed by a Board of Directors with seven primary members, each of whom has an alternate. Six of the directors are elected from the Parent-Teacher Organization and eight are representatives of major corporate sponsors of the school, including the U.S. Embassy. The school is operated with the consent of the government of Trinidad and Tobago.

In the 2022–23 school year, there were 62 total staff, comprising 45 teachers, 7 of whom are U.S. citizens, 32 are host country nationals and 6 are third-country nationals.

== Curriculum ==
The International School of Port of Spain (ISPS) is an academic college-preparatory school located west of the capital city of Port of Spain in Westmoorings. The school offers a curriculum that includes Spanish as a foreign language from grade 2. All students also participate in art, music, physical education, drama, health and computer studies.

The school follows the Primary Years Programme and the Middle Years Programme.

The school is structured into separate elementary, middle, and high schools. Since August 1997, ISPS has been offering Advanced Placement courses. Additionally, there is a program meant for students with mild learning difficulties. The school holds accreditation from the Southern Association of Colleges and Schools.

== Facilities ==
ISPS operates on a purpose-built campus that was established in May 1999 on reclaimed land. The campus features various instructional spaces, including a multi-purpose hall, cafeteria, three computer labs, four science labs, two art rooms and a library/media center. With 30 classrooms and a fully air-conditioned gymnasium, the campus also provides athletic fields, asphalt play yards, a sandy playground, and enclosed activity areas.

== See also ==
- List of schools in Trinidad and Tobago
