= Tobago Hospitality and Tourism Institute =

Coordinates: 11.197665°N 60.683480°W

- Other names: THTI, Tobago Hotel School
- Motto: Committed to Tourism, Committed to You
- Type: Public
- Established: 1997
- Affiliations: Tobago House of Assembly
- Officer in charge: Mr. Stephen Sheppard
- Location: Blenheim, Mt. St. George Tobago , Trinidad and Tobago
- Campus: 99 acres (0.40 km^{2})
- Website: www.thti.edu.tt

The Tobago Hospitality and Tourism Institute, also known as THTI, is a state owned Institute in Tobago, Trinidad and Tobago founded in 1997. The campus is currently situated on 99 acres (0.40 km^{2}) of land in the Blenheim, Mount Saint George on the island of Tobago of the Republic of Trinidad and Tobago. The Institute caters for graduates from the Secondary Schools or persons with experience in the world of tourism, hospitality and culinary arts. THTI has designed their programs ensuring that students are fully prepared through both theory and practical applications. The institute has a mix of associate degrees, Certificates (Short Courses) and Modular courses.

It is one of two Institutes in Trinidad and Tobago, that deal with tourism, hospitality and culinary studies, the other being the Trinidad and Tobago Hospitality and Tourism Institute (TTHTI).
