= Tunapuna =

- Town
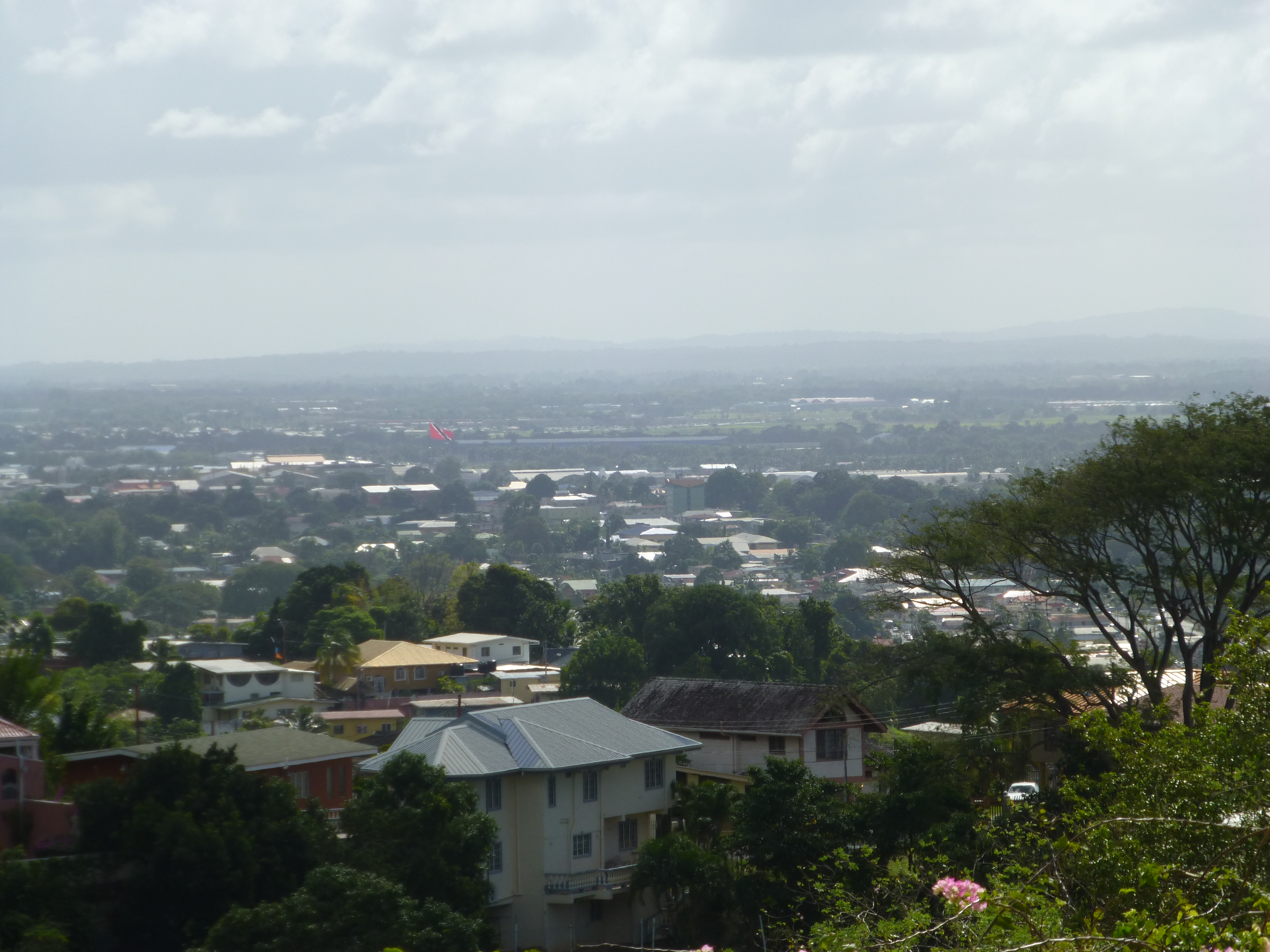
- Tunapuna, with Trincity in the background

- Location in Trinidad
- Coordinates: 10°38′N 61°23′W
- Country: Trinidad and Tobago
- Region: Tunapuna–Piarco

Population (2011)
  - Total: 26,829
- Time zone: UTC-4 (UTC -4)

Tunapuna is a town in the East–West Corridor of the island of Trinidad, in Trinidad and Tobago.

== Town ==
Tunapuna is located between St. Augustine, Tacarigua and Trincity. Tunapuna is the largest town between San Juan and Arima. It is an important market and commercial centre, and is the seat of the Tunapuna–Piarco Regional Corporation. The Tunapuna Parliamentary seat is a marginal, hence popular wisdom dictates: "If you win Tunapuna, you win the elections." The only gurdwara (Sikh temple) in Trinidad and Tobago is located in Tunapuna and dates back to some of the first Punjabi Indian immigrants in 1929.

== Carnival ==
For more than one hundred years, Tunapuna has been a Carnival venue. Each year this regional carnival, which is a showcase for traditional and conventional mas, steel band, and stick fighting, is organised by the Tunapuna Carnival Committee.

== Notable people ==
The renowned writer and scholar C. L. R. James was born and is buried here, and popular 1950s pianist Winifred Atwell was born here. Songwriter, composer, writer and director Donald Heywood, best remembered for composing "I'm Coming Virginia" in 1926, which became a hit for Ethel Waters was born in Tunapuna in 1896. Professional footballer Stern John was born in Tunapuna.

== In popular culture ==
The song "Tuna Puna Trinidad" was the B-side of a single released by Petula Clark in 1955.
