= Arima Government Secondary School =

Coordinates: 10.6343°N 61.2769°W

Arima Central Secondary School
- Robert Street; Arima; Trinidad and Tobago

Information
- Type: Public/Government
- Motto: Adelantemos Juntos ("Moving Forward Together")
- Established: 1961
- Principal: Mr. Billy Dhoray
- Faculty: about 55 staff members
- Grades: Forms 1 - 6
- Enrollment: < 600
- Campus: Urban
- Colors: Cream, brown and khaki
- Mascot: Centralite powder
- Nickname: Central

Arima Central Secondary School, formerly called Arima Government Secondary School (commonly referred to as "Central" or "ACSS"), is a co-educational secondary school on Roberts Street in Arima in the Republic of Trinidad and Tobago. The school is administered by the Ministry of Education, Trinidad and Tobago.

Arima Central Secondary school is regarded as one of the best schools in east Trinidad. The winner of the Environmental Management Authority Green Leaf award in 2006, its students have had marked success in the areas of Science, Politics, Law, Engineering, English literature, Business, as well as Performing Arts.

The school can be termed a "seven-year" school since it offers form six subjects. Expanding its list of subjects, it is now one of only two schools in Arima offering Mathematics as a Form Six subject. In 2009, the school introduced Chemistry and Biology to Form Six students, and the school introduced Physics in 2011. The introduction of form six classes saw and increase in students pursuing higher learning, more than 90% of these students have gone onto tertiary education at the University of the West Indies as well as other prestigious schools in the US, Europe, and Canada.

The motto of the school is "Adelantemos Juntos" which translates to "Moving Forward Together" in English.

== School layout ==
The main entrance to ACSS happens to be via Robert Street, which feeds directly into the front gate. Upon entering the front gate the Form 2 and 3 blocks are immediately on the left, the cafeteria is directly ahead and the administrative offices are to the right along with the Information Technology lab. Beyond the cafeteria is the basketball court, to the right is a famous spot for students fondly called "the tunnel", to the left is the staff room. Walking straight ahead would lead to an open area for sports. The form six block is the last one closest to Arima New Government, a primary school which was formerly situated next to ACSS. And has now become a part of the main school, for the purpose of new facilities and added space.

== Active groups and extracurricular activities ==
=== Co-Curricular ===
- Netball
- Cadets
- Football
- Basketball
- Cricket
- Swimming
- Badminton
- Volleyball
- Track & Field
- Ballroom and Latin Dance
- Scrabble
- Chess
- Table Tennis

=== Other Extra Curricular Groups ===
- Various Religious Groups
- Heroes Foundation

== Academic Year ==
The school year is divided into three terms, with Term 1 beginning in early September and running to December, Term 2 running from January to March, and Term 3 from April to July. In addition to a summer break, there is typically a two-week break between terms.

=== School holidays/vacation ===
==== First Term: September to December ====
- Republic Day, September 24
- Eid ul-Fitr
- Diwali
- Christmas, Approximately 3 weeks vacation

==== Second Term: January to March ====
- Carnival
- Easter, Approximately 2 weeks vacation
- Spiritual Baptist/Shouter Liberation Day, March 30

==== Third Term: April to July ====
- Corpus Christi
- Indian Arrival Day, May 30
- Labour Day, July 19
- Summer, Approximately 9 weeks vacation

=== View of the school ===
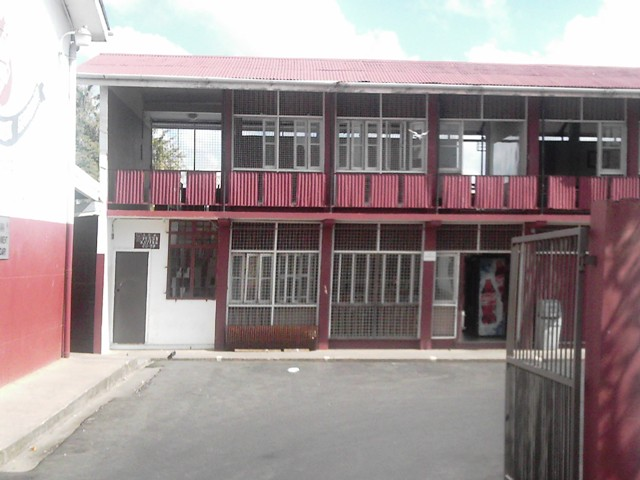
The Front of ACSS

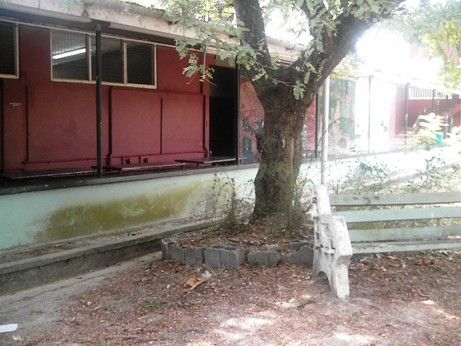
The Famous Tunnel

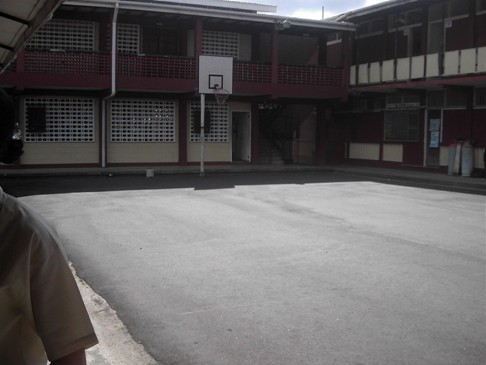
The Court Yard

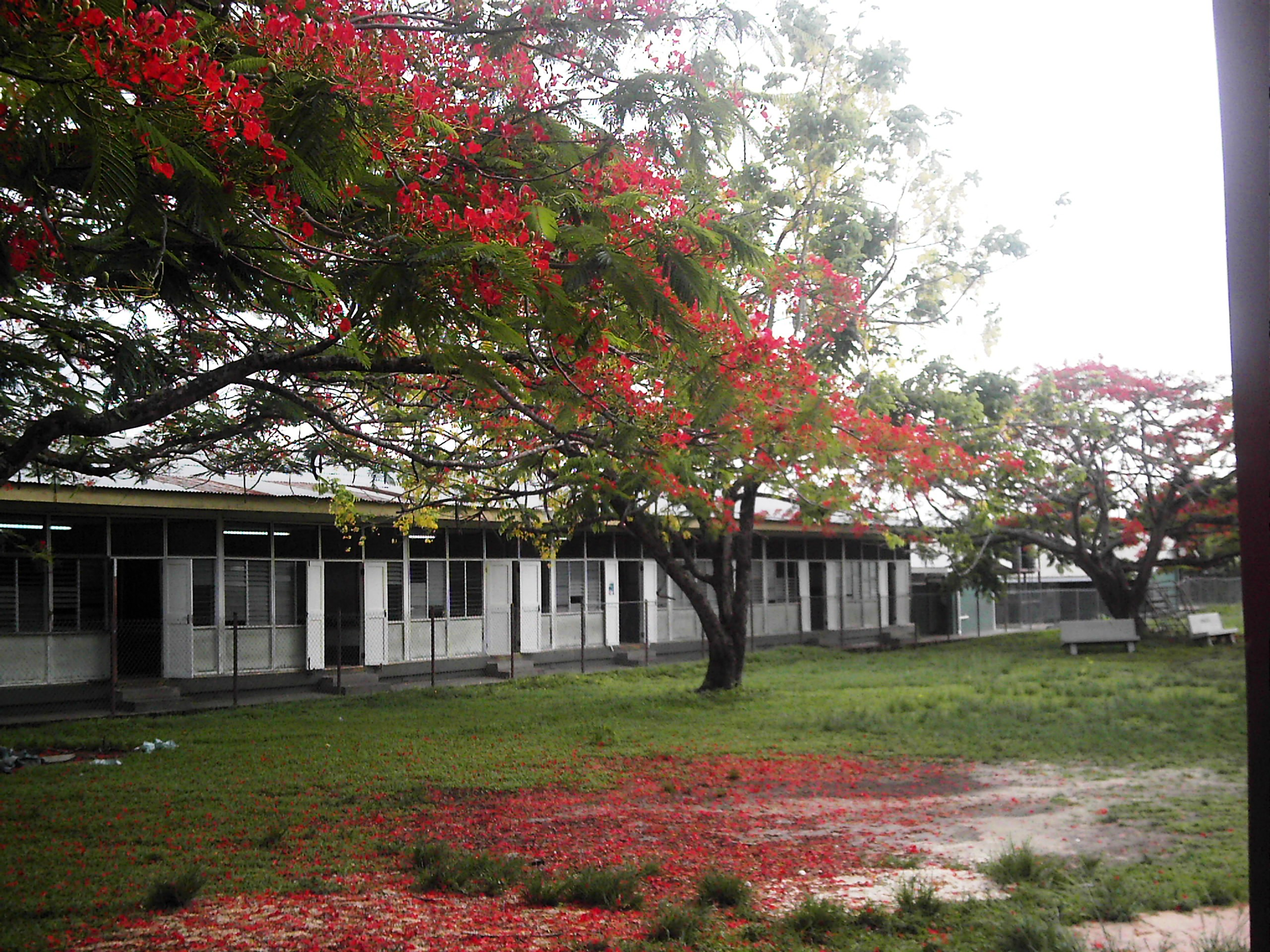
View of The back near ANG (Arima New Government Primary)

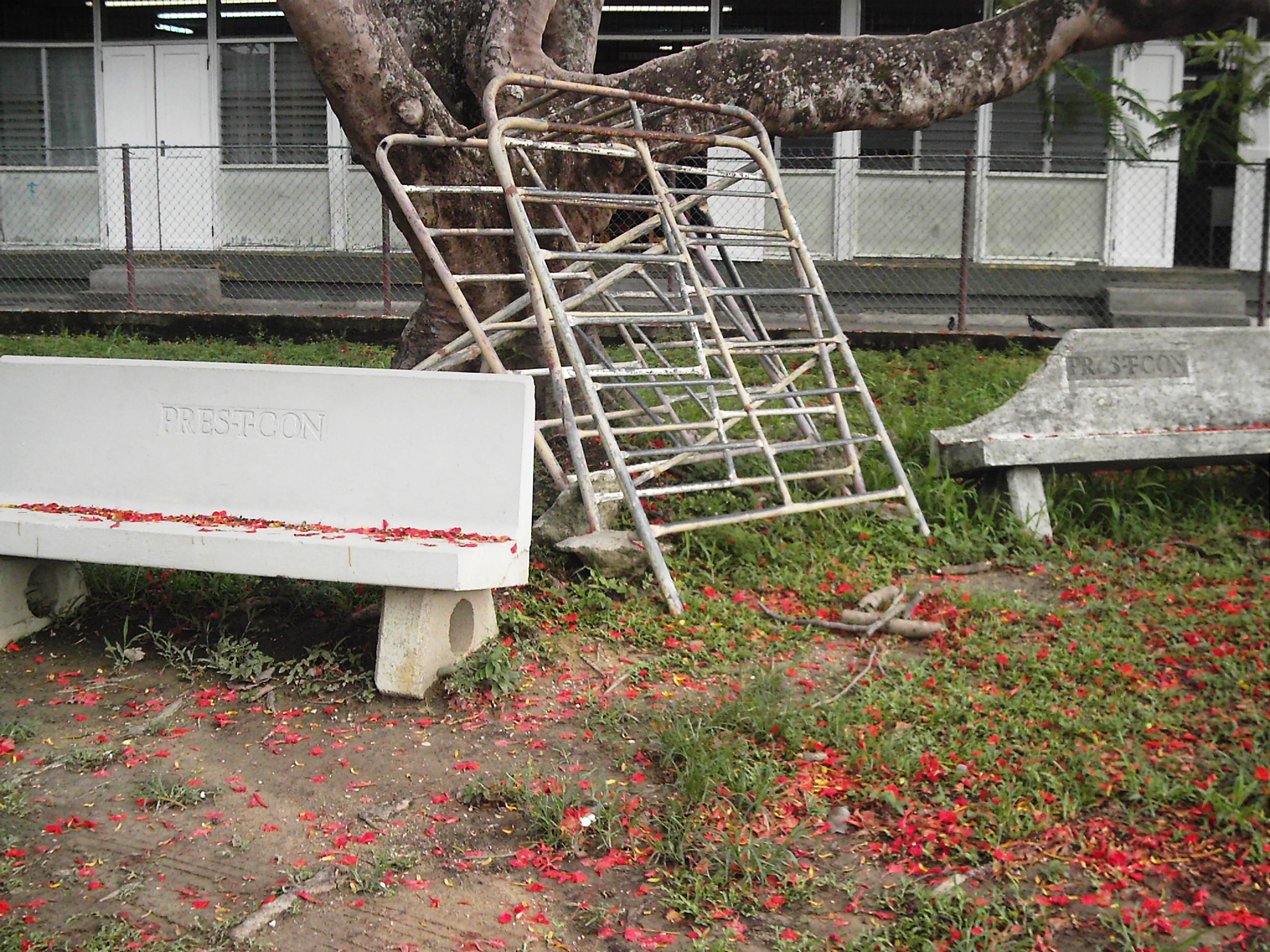
Another Famous Liming Spot

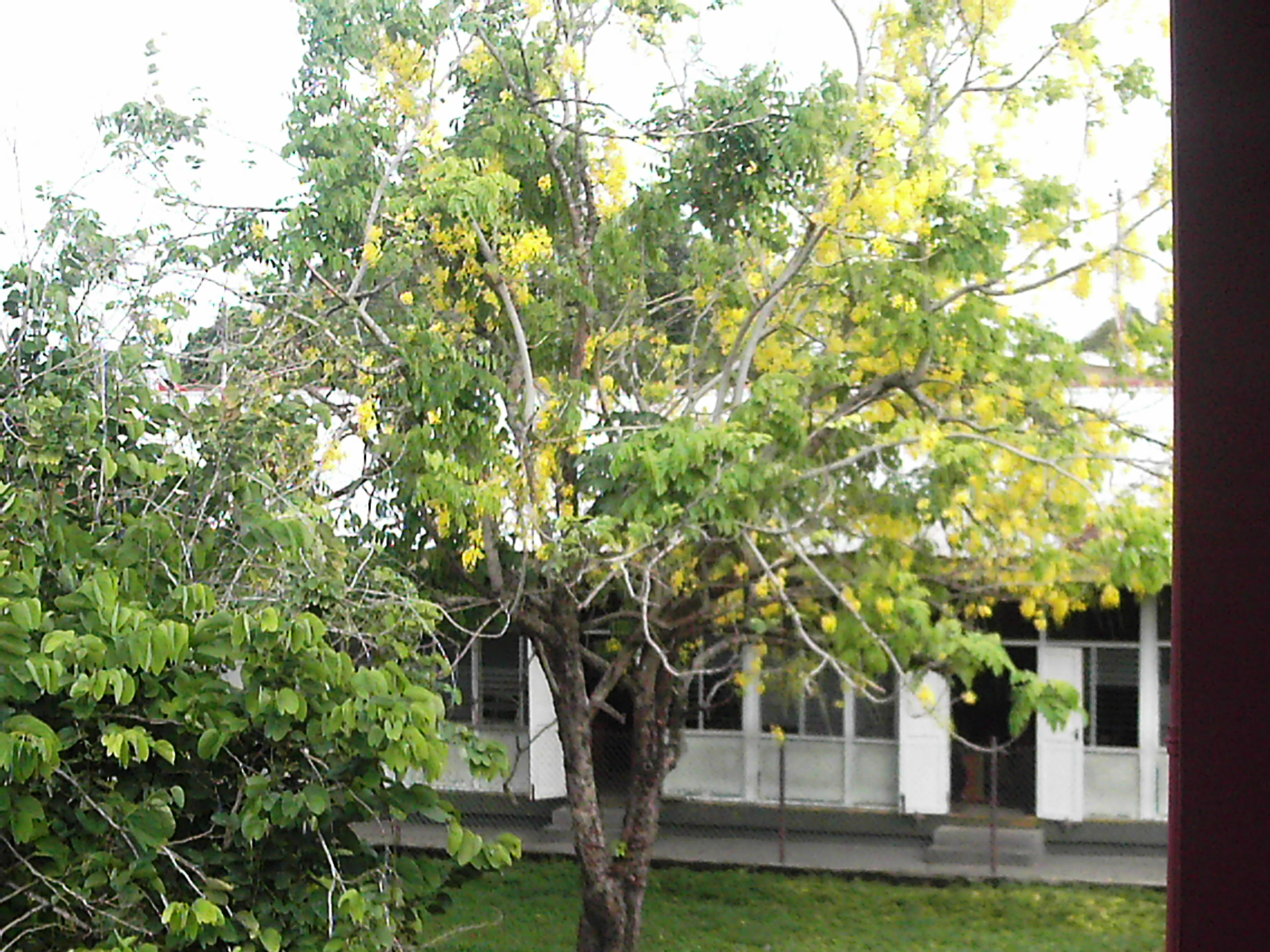
The Back
