= Harmon School of S.D.A. =

Harmon School of Seventh Day Adventist
- Rockley Vale, Scarborough, Tobago. Trinidad and Tobago

Information
- Type: High School
- Motto: Nihil Sine Numine
- Established: 1952
- Website: http://harmonsda.edu.tt/

Harmon School of S.D.A. is a private Seventh-day Adventist secondary school in Tobago. Established in 1952, it was named after the founder of the Seventh-day Adventist Church, Ellen G. White's maiden name, Harmon.
