= List of Trinidad and Tobago special schools =

This article lists the special schools in Trinidad and Tobago

- Charis Works Christian Academy
- The Academy for Special Needs
- The Immortelle Centre
- Princess Elizabeth Centre (for physically disabled people)
- School for the Blind
- School for the Deaf
- Lady Hochoy Home (for the cognitively impaired)
- Visionary Learning Centre (for children with mental and learning disabilities)
- Palmeras Learning Centre ( For children who experience learning difficulties in the primary and secondary schools)
- Aspirare Learning Community ( NPO for children with mental and learning difficulties in the primary age category)
- Little Blossoms Behavioral Centre( For children with learning difficulties in the preschool and primary school)
