= The Immortelle Centre =

Immortelle Children's Centre for Special Education

Location
- 1A St. Ann's Gardens; St. Ann's; Port of Spain; Trinidad and Tobago
- Coordinates: 10.6797°N 61.5076°W

Information
- School type: Private
- Opened: 1989
- Founder: Mrs Beth Teelucksingh
- School district: Port of Spain and Environs
- Category: Special Education (Profound)
- Oversight: School Board
- Chairman: Mr Charles Mouttet
- Principal: Mrs. Charlene Gittens (Acting)
- Faculty: 25
- Gender: Co-ed
- Enrollment: 70
- Campus type: Urban
- Colours: Orange, White and Gray
- Affiliations: Consortium of Disability Organisations, Private Special Schools Association of Trinidad and Tobago

The Immortelle Children's Centre is a special school for disabled people located in Port of Spain, Trinidad and Tobago. It is the only school in the area that accepts persons with multiple disabilities in the moderate to severe range.

The school was founded in 1986 by Beth Harry.

== Services ==
The centre offers a wide range of services to its students given the broad range of their abilities and challenges. The centre is a pioneer among local special schools for its wide use of various therapies. As part of its general curriculum the school offers music therapy and art therapy onsite as well as equine therapy and aquatherapy. The Immortelle also has several arrangements with foreign universities and local professionals who visit yearly for varying periods of time to offer services in psychotherapy, occupational therapy and speech therapy.
