= Trincity =

- Town
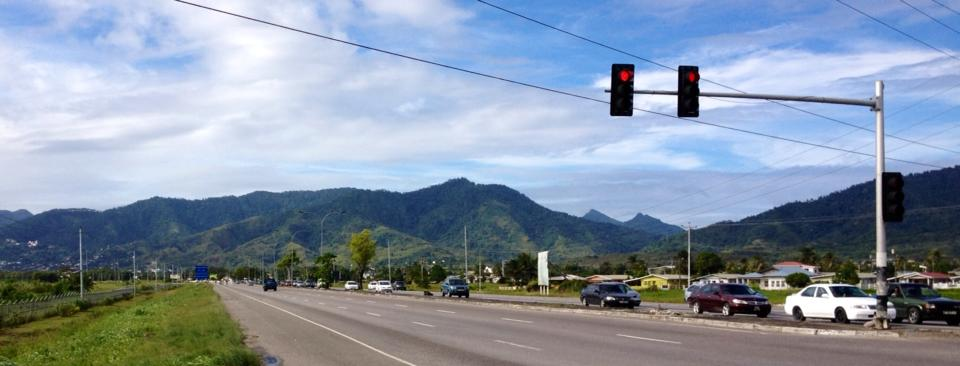
- View of Trincity housing looking north-west from the Churchill–Roosevelt Highway

- Location within Trinidad and Tobago
- Coordinates: 10°38′07″N 61°21′22″W
- Country: Trinidad and Tobago
- Region: Tunapuna–Piarco

Area
  - Total: 1.087 sq mi (2.82 km^{2})

Population (2011)
  - Total: 10,075
- Ranked
- Time zone: UTC−4 (AST)
- Area code: 868

Trincity is a planned community in northern Trinidad. It is located along the East–West Corridor south of Tunapuna and north of Piarco. It is part of the Trincity/Maloney parliamentary constituency with an area of 1.087 km^{2}. It has a population of 10,075 residents. It also has two schools Dinsley/Trincity Government Primary School and Bishop's/Trinity East College, a secondary school.

Trincity was developed by Home Construction Limited which is part of CL Financial (CLF) group. In recent years Trincity has been one of the major growth areas in Trinidad and Tobago (together with Chaguanas).

Trincity Mall has been substantially enlarged, to a total of 2 million square feet making it the largest contiguous mall in the Caribbean. Trincity Mall's anchor tenants include Caribbean Cinemas (eight-screen cineplex), Radio Shack, Francis Fashions, Tru Valu Grand Market, Pennywise Superstore and Excellent Stores. Construction of an office park, three gated communities and a PGA golf course have been completed.

Trincity Mall is a large indoor shopping center located adjacent to the Churchill Roosevelt Highway in Trincity. It is part of Trincity Commercial Centre of Home Construction Limited (HCL). The CL Financial group has been under liquidation since 2017, with the liquidators being Grant Thornton. In April 2025 the Trinidad Guardian reported that Trincity Commercial Centre was sold for TT$505 million to a consortium consisting of Johnny Aboud, Anthony Rahael, KallCo and Fides Ltd.

== Gallery ==
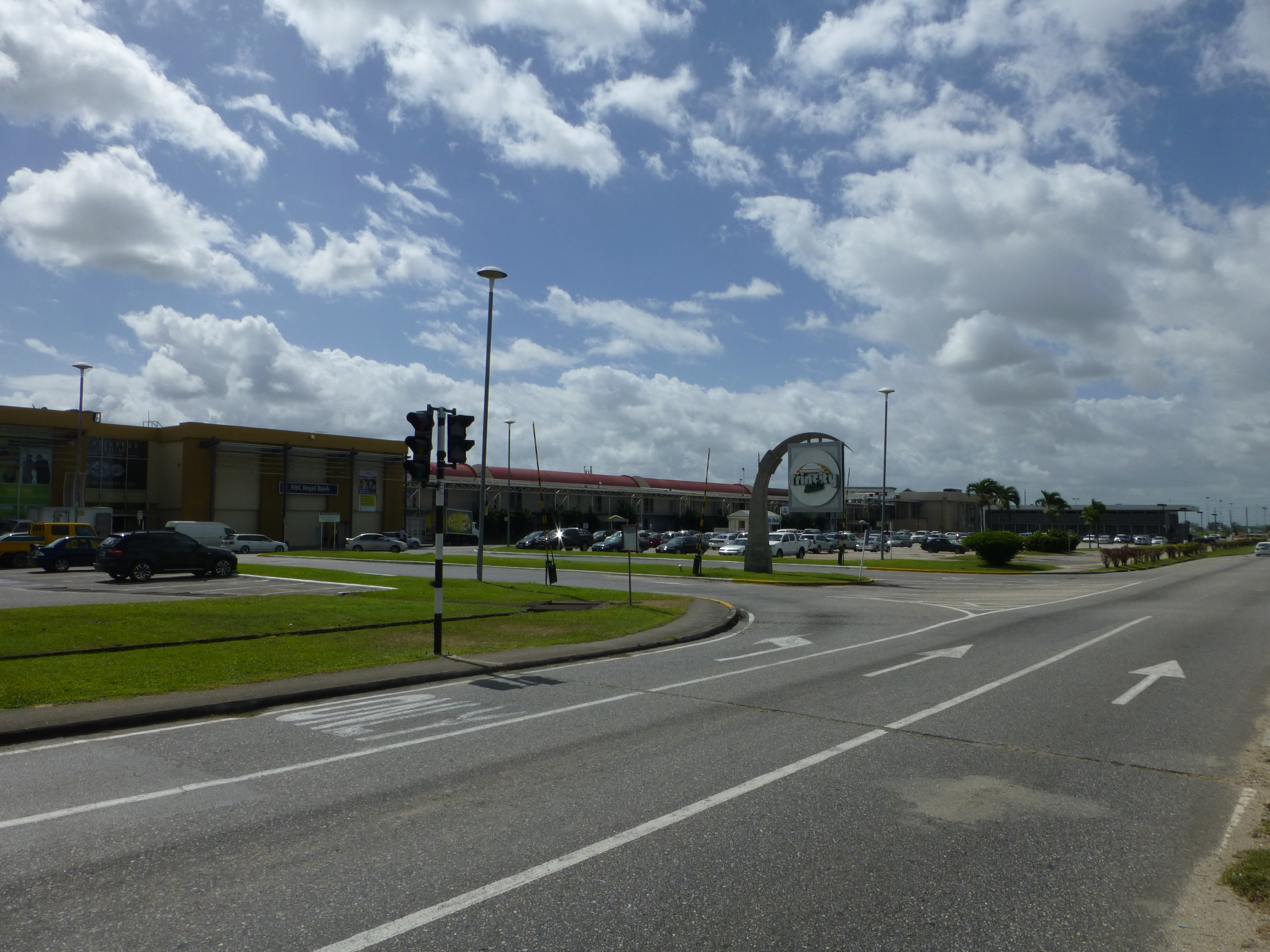
Trincity Mall

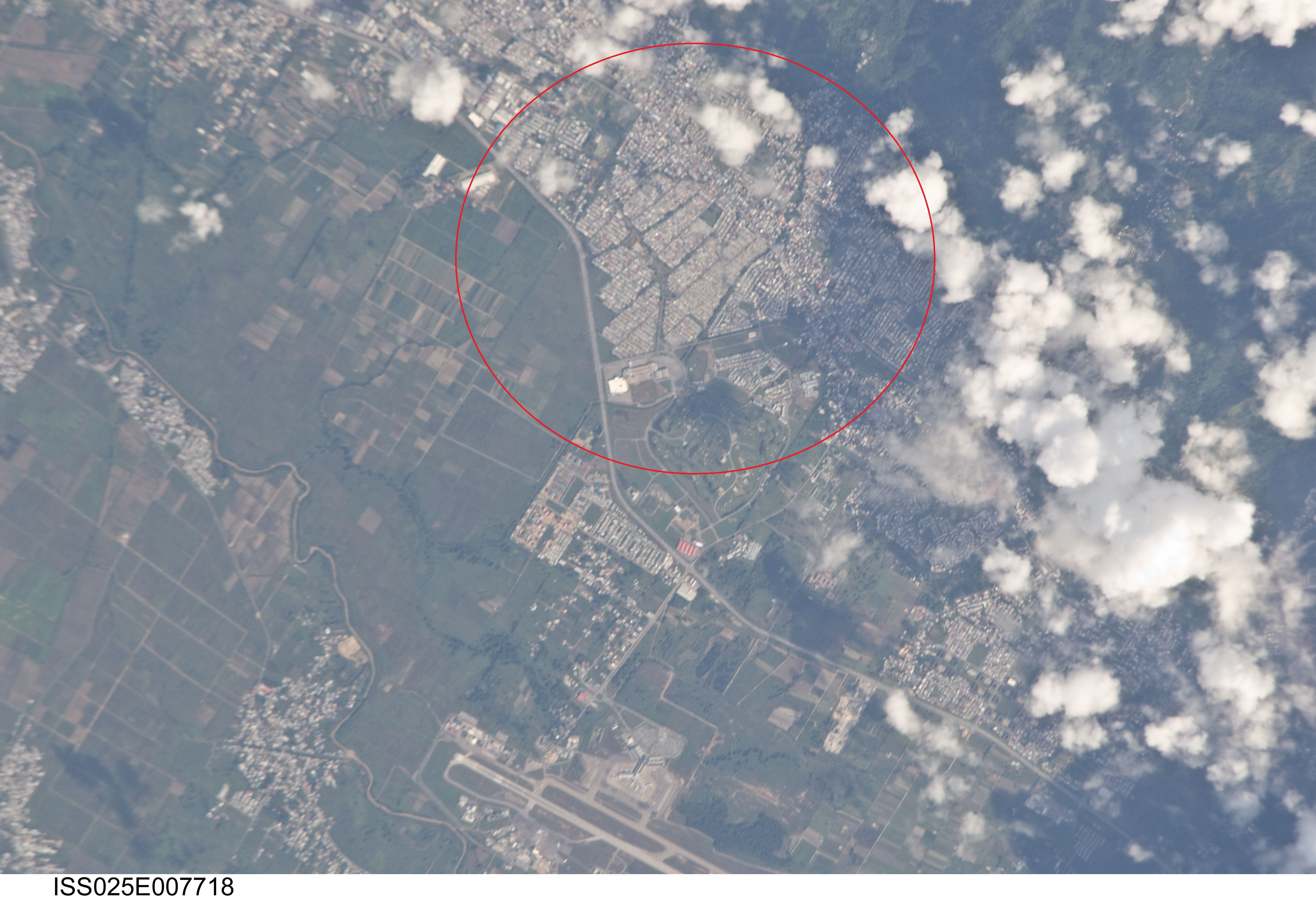
Satellite view of Trincity
