= Secondary Entrance Assessment =

School exam in Trinidad and Tobago

The Secondary Entrance Assessment (SEA) is a government exam sat by children aged 11 to 13 of Trinidad and Tobago as part of the admissions process for all public secondary schools. The SEA was introduced in 2001, to replace the older Common Entrance exam.

== Subjects ==
The SEA tests students on three areas: Language Arts, which includes Spelling, Grammar, and Punctuation and Capitalization and Comprehension, and a Graphic Task 6, Mathematics, and Creative Writing.

== Structure ==
=== Language Arts ===
The Language Arts section of the exam is divided into three sections, testing respectively Grammar Skills, Spelling,Punctuation, Vocabulary, Graphic and Comprehension.

=== Mathematics ===
The Mathematics section of the exam is divided into three sections of general mathematics content, with the difficulty and value of the questions increasing with respect to section. For example section one is usually one(1) mark per question, section two(2) is two(2) or three(3) marks and section three(3) is four(4) marks

=== Creative Writing ===
In the Creative Writing section, students must choose to write either a narrative or a report, from a small choice subject material. The themes chosen usually reflect some aspect of Caribbean life, such as picking fruit or apologizing to a neighbor for a broken window. Creative writing is assessed in grades four and five. In grade four students are to write factual passages and in grade five students are to write narrative descriptive passages

=== Preparation for the Exam ===
Parents and Students both find preparing for this exam a difficult task, mainly due to the emphasis placed on passing for the First Choice school. Many students attend after-school Private Lessons. Leading towards the exam, most students will prepare via Practice Tests and Past Papers from previous years; these are usually sold by private organizations; Local newspapers also regularly offer free tests on set days. As of 2010, a free to use website has been available for all students within Trinidad and Tobago; pennacool.com offers exercises for 24 Topics in both Mathematics and Language Arts.

== Comparison to the Common Entrance Examinations ==
The precursor to the SEA, the Common Entrance exam, was multiple choice and tested a wider range of subjects. English, Mathematics, Social Studies and Science were tested. Apart from a short Creative Writing Section at the end of the English section, the entire exam was multiple choice. Multiple choice was eliminated when the exams changed to the SEA, the idea being that a written exam would be more indicative of a child's education and competency.

== See also ==
Common Entrance
