= Caribbean Examinations Council =

Caribbean-based examination board

Caribbean Examination Council

Agency overview
- Formed: 1972; 54 years ago
- Headquarters: Prince Road Pine Plantation Road, Saint Michael, Barbados
- Annual budget: $50 Million
- Agency executives: Dr Wayne Wesley, Chief Registrar and CEO; Dr Eduardo R. Ali, Pro Registrar and Deputy CEO
- Website: cxc.org

The Caribbean Examinations Council (CXC) is an examination board in the Caribbean. It was established in 1972 under agreement by the participating governments in the Caribbean Community to conduct such examinations as it may think appropriate and award certificates and diplomas on the results of any such examinations so conducted. The council is empowered to regulate the conduct of any such examinations and prescribe the qualification requirements of candidates and the fees payable by them. It is now an examining body that provides educational certifications in 16 English-speaking Commonwealth Caribbean countries and territories and has replaced the General Certificate of Education (GCE) examinations used by England and some other members of the Commonwealth. The CXC is an institution of the Caribbean Community (CARICOM); it was recognised as an Associate Institution of the Community in the 1973 treaty that created the Caribbean Community. Members of the council are drawn from the 16 territories and the region's two universities, the University of Guyana and the University of the West Indies.

== Structure of the council ==
It currently consists of the following members:

- The vice chancellor of the University of the West Indies;
- The vice chancellor of the University of Guyana;
- Three representatives of the University of the West Indies appointed by the vice chancellor of the University of the West Indies, regard being given to the geographic dispersion of the campuses;
- One representative of the University of Guyana appointed by the vice chancellor of the University of Guyana;
- Two representatives appointed by each of the Participating Governments of Barbados, Guyana, Jamaica and Trinidad and Tobago and one representative appointed by each of the other Participating Governments;
- One representative of the teaching profession appointed by each National Committee from among its members.

The Participating Territories are Anguilla, Antigua and Barbuda, Barbados, Belize, British Virgin Islands, Cayman Islands, Dominica, Grenada, Guyana, Jamaica, Montserrat, Saint Kitts and Nevis, Saint Lucia, Saint Vincent and the Grenadines, Trinidad and Tobago and Turks and Caicos Islands.

Members of the council hold office for a period of three years. The chairman (who is eligible for re-election) and deputy chairman are elected from among the members of council to hold office for three years or for the unexpired term of their appointments as members of the council. The council organises its business on a triennial basis, using the calendar year as its operative year.

The registrar is the chief executive of the council, and the council may delegate to him any of its duties relating to the holding of examinations and the appointments of staff members other than himself or the pro-registrar.

== Examinations ==
In 2002, there has been a move away from the GCE Advanced Level to the CXC CAPE examinations, making them a de facto university entrance examination in some nations. Some universities also require applicants to take separate entrance examination. The International Baccalaureate and European Baccalaureate are also accepted.

The Caribbean Examinations Council offers three levels of examinations and certifications:

- the Caribbean Primary Exit Assessment (CPEA)
- the Caribbean Secondary Education Certification (CSEC)
- the Caribbean Advanced Proficiency Examinations (CAPE)

The CXC Associate Degree Programme was unveiled in 2005; it is a tertiary qualification based on the CAPE certification.

- Caribbean Secondary Education Certificate (CSEC) examinations are usually taken by students after five years of secondary school, and mark the end of standard secondary education. The CSEC examinations are equivalent to the Ordinary Level (O-Levels) examinations and are targeted towards students sixteen and older. The CSEC examinations are often called the CXC examinations as they were the only examinations offered by the CXC from 1979 until 1998.
- Caribbean Advanced Proficiency Examinations (CAPE) examinations are taken by students who have completed their secondary education and wish to continue their studies. Students who wish to sit for the CAPE usually possess CSEC or an equivalent certification. The CAPE is equivalent to the Advanced Levels (A-levels) and they are both voluntary qualifications that are intended for university entrance. Since it was introduced in 1998, the number of subjects offered at CAPE has increased.

While it may vary by territory, the CSECs are generally viewed as an employment qualification certifying the holder as a secondary school graduate. While the CAPE is considered a suitable qualification for entry into tertiary education.

The island territories of Sint Maarten and Saba—both part of the Kingdom of the Netherlands—also conduct exams administered by the council. In 1993, the Caribbean Examinations Council Act was commenced by the Parliament of Jamaica to secure the integrity of examinations conducted by the council in the country.

== See also ==
- IB Diploma Programme
- International Standard Classification of Education
