= Sforzata Steelband =

Steel band

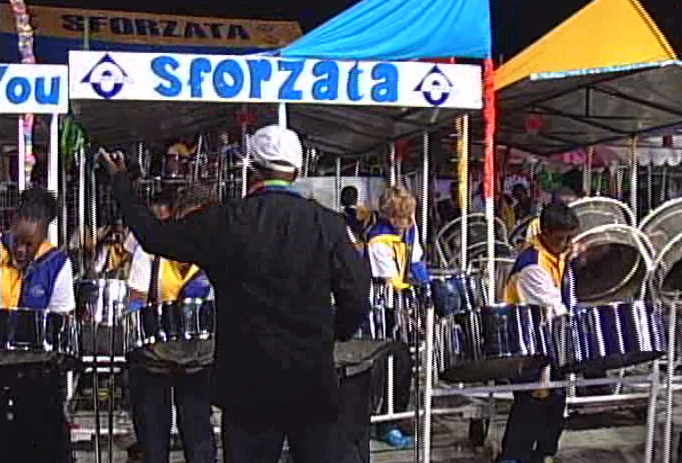
- Sforzata Steelband at the Panorama finals in 2008

Background information
- Origin: Curepe, Trinidad
- Genres: Steelpan; Trinidadian
- Years active: 1975–present
- Members: (incomplete list) Merlin "Mutt" Gill (Founder); Yohan Popwell (Arranger); Trevor Reid (Captain/Manager); Joslyn Earle-Jones (Treasurer) Derek Nurse (Drillmaster)
- Website: http://www.sforzatatt.com

The Sforzata Steel Orchestra is a Trinidad and Tobago steelpan band, formed on 29 July 1975 by arranger Merlin "Mutt" Gill, Irvin Burgess and other musicians who had left the nearby Scherzando Steel Orchestra.

== Early years ==
Early on, Sforzata gained financial support from the National Brewery in the sum of TTD $8,000.00. For this assistance, the band adopted the name Mackeson Sforzata for a short period of time. Sforzata gained a local following but were not as popular as Scherzando had been. Part of the reason for this had to do with its location and composition. The panyard site was at the corner of Warren Street and the Eastern Main Road, Saint Augustine. However, the band drew the majority of its membership and strength of its support from outside the area - as far as Arouca, Arima and Santa Cruz. For this reason, it was decided to remove the city name "Curepe" from the band's title, in contrast to its predecessor, which is still known as Curepe Scherzando. In 1984 Sforzata was evicted from its panyard and forced to take up residence on a vacant lot near the Priority Bus Route. New support from the area at this time was encouraged not only by the band's success at national competitions, but also by the negative stigma attached to the Scherzando due to the high incidence of drugs within the band and panyard site.

== Music competition ==
In the 1976 Panorama, Sforzata placed third in the Eastern Zonal Finals and made it as far as the National Semi-Finals. In the same year, 16 members of the band toured to Miami and played at the bicentennial celebration of American Independence. The band managed to make it to the finals in 1978 but placed last with their rendition of Lord Kitchener's Pan in the 21st Century. Surrounded by a variety of musical styles, the band won the Bomb competition with the folk song Mango and continued to be in winner's row for the next three years.

Sforzata's track record at Panorama prompted it to be labelled by pan aficionados as the Sunshine Band. The orchestra was consistently unsuccessful on the final night of the Panorama Competition despite performing well in preliminary rounds. This affected the band's players, and the band gradually shrank in size. In an attempt to reverse this trend, the band's arranger Merlin "Mutt" Gill sponsored the band in 1985, but even this had little effect.

With the establishment of the medium band category in 2004, Sforzata found new success. In 2005, the band began working with a new arranger, Yohan Popwell, and subsequently won the preliminary, semifinal, and final rounds in 2005 for their first ever Panorama victory with Shadow's tune, Dingolay. They successfully defended their title in 2006 playing Baron's This Melody Sweet. In 2007 and 2008 the band placed third in the Panorama finals.

== Songs and placement ==
Sforzata in the Medium Category of the national Panorama competition:

Year	Song	Arranger	Rank
2004	War 2004	Merlin Gill	-
2005	Dingolay	Yohan Popwell	1st place
2006	This Melody Sweet	Yohan Popwell	1st place
2007	Calypso Music	Yohan Popwell	3rd place
2008	Thunder Coming	Yohan Popwell	3rd place
2009	Bandoleros	Yohan Popwell	1st place
