= Uriah Butler Highway =

Highway in Trinidad and Tobago

Route information
- Length: 15.6 km (9.7 mi)
- Existed: 1958–present

Major junctions
- North end: Champs Fleur
- Valsayn
- South end: Chaguanas

Location
- Country: Trinidad and Tobago
- Major cities: Chaguanas, San Juan

Highway system
- Transport in Trinidad and Tobago

The Uriah Butler Highway, sometimes referred to as UBH, is one of the major north–south highways on Trinidad in Trinidad and Tobago.

It is named after Tubal Uriah Butler.

It runs from Champs Fleurs to Chaguanas where it meets the Sir Solomon Hochoy Highway. It crosses the Churchill–Roosevelt Highway at Valsayn.

The highway was originally named the Princess Margaret Highway and was constructed in 1958. It was extended and renamed for labour leader Tubal Uriah Butler in 1988.

== Description ==
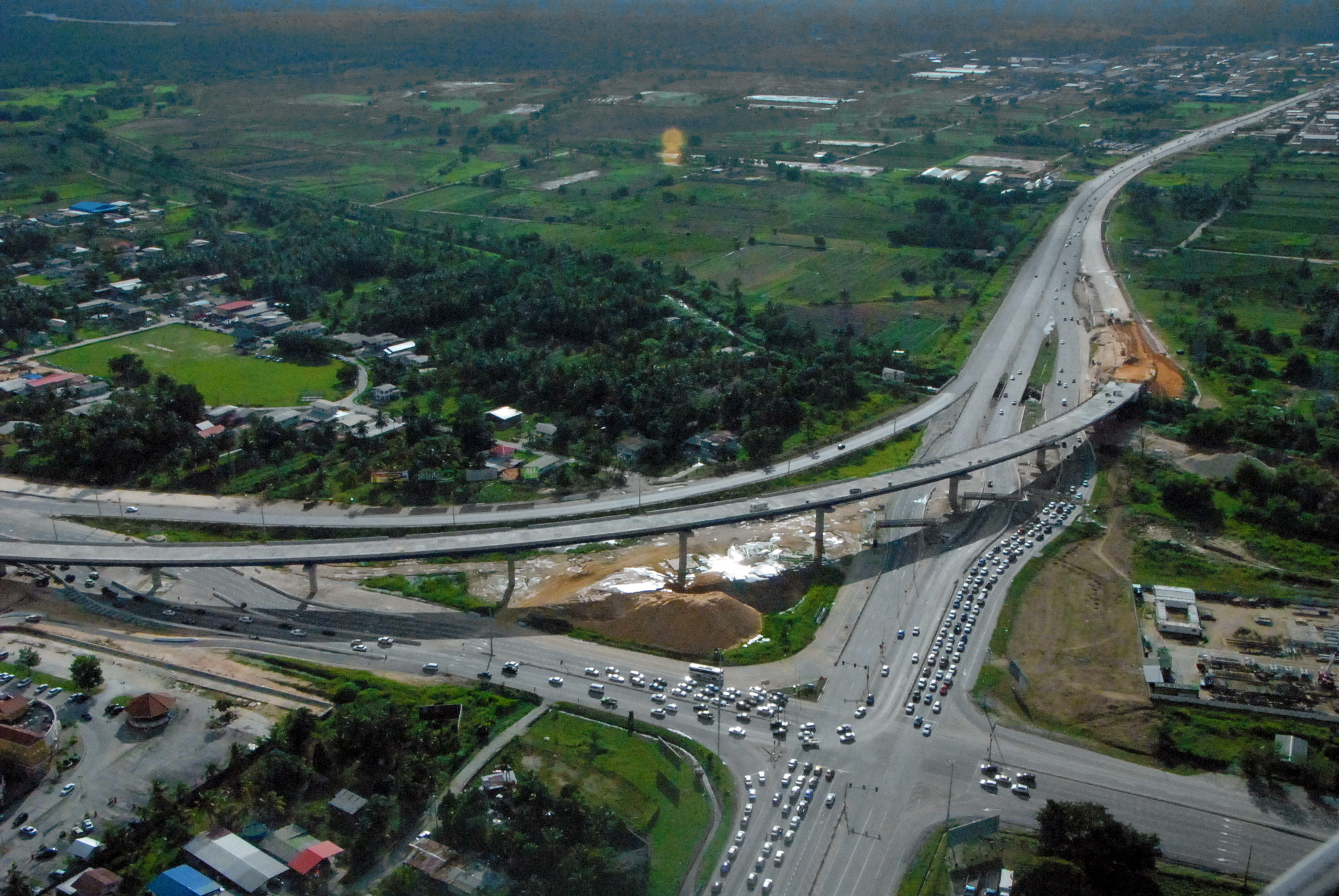
An intersection of Churchill–Roosevelt Highway and Uriah Butler Highway, 2009

The Uriah Butler Highway is generally considered the more important of the two north-south highways on Trinidad, as it carries both traffic from the Sir Solomon Hochoy Highway and traffic from areas north of Chaguanas. Because of this, it suffers from congestion on most weekdays.

=== Route ===
The highway begins at Champs Fleurs, crossing the Priority Bus Route and Eastern Main Road successively. Further south and just before the Valsayn interchange, a roundabout provides access to Mount Hope. At Grand Bazaar, west of Valsayn, the highway crosses the east-west Churchill Roosevelt Highway, connected via a modern interchange with high speed ramps. It then continues past Bamboo Village, Caroni, Cunupia and Chaguanas, where it joins the Sir Solomon Hochoy Highway which runs south to Debe.

=== Features ===
From Champs Fleurs to Grand Bazaar, the expressway has 2 lanes in either direction. From Grand Bazaar to the southern terminus at Chaguanas, the expressway is mostly a 6 lane dual carriageway, excluding a brief section of the southbound lane at Grand Bazaar having 4 lanes. The entire highway is grade separated from Grand Bazaar to Chaguanas. North of Grand Bazaar, one roundabout provides access to the Eric Williams Medical Sciences Complex, while the northern terminus is signalized. There are six pedestrian overpasses scattered from Guayamare to Endeavour.

== Exit List ==
The following table lists the major junctions along the Uriah Butler Highway. The entire route is located in Trinidad.

Region	Location	Km	Mile	Exit	Destinations	Notes
San Juan–Laventille	Champs Fleur	0.0	0.0	—	Eastern Main Road	Northern Terminus
San Juan–Laventille	Champs Fleur	0.05	0.031	1	Priority Bus Route	Access to Buses, Taxis, emergency vehicles and authorised private vehicles only
San Juan–Laventille	San Juan	0.8	0.50	2	– Eric Williams Medical Sciences Complex; Max Richards Drive	Exit via Roundabout. Access to UWI Arthur Lok Jack Global School of Business and Eric Williams Medical Sciences Complex (Mt. Hope Hospital)
San Juan–Laventille	Valsayn	1.8	1.1	3	Churchill Roosevelt Highway – Port of Spain, San Juan, Tunapuna, Arima – Piarco International Airport	Interchange with Churchill Roosevelt Highway
San Juan–Laventille	Bamboo Village	2.8	1.7	4	Bamboo #1 Road	
San Juan–Laventille	Caroni	5.0	3.1	5	Caroni Savannah Road – Piarco International Airport	Alternative route to Piarco International Airport
San Juan–Laventille	Chaguanas	8.6	5.3	6	Guayamare Link Road	Access from UBH Nouthbound only
San Juan–Laventille	Chaguanas	9.1	5.7	7	Bejucal Road	UBH Southbound Exit only
Chaguanas		9.5	5.9	8	Munroe Road	
Chaguanas		11.5	7.1	9	Charlieville Feeder Road, Caroni Savannah Road, Ackbar Road, Jerningham Junction Road	
Chaguanas		12.5	7.8	10	Endeavour Connector Road, Narsaloo Ramaya Marg Road, Soogrim Trace, Biljah Road	
Chaguanas		15.5	9.6	11	Chaguanas Main Road, Southern Main Road	
Chaguanas		15.6	9.7	—	Sir Solomon Hochoy Highway – Couva, San Fernando, Point Fortin	Southern terminus, freeway continues south into Couva–Tabaquite–Talparo as the Sir Solomon Hochoy Highway
1.000 mi = 1.609 km; 1.000 km = 0.621 mi: Closed/former; Concurrency terminus; Incomplete access; Tolled; Route transition; Unopened
