= List of steelbands =

Steelbands, originating from Trinidad and Tobago, are groups of musicians who play steelpan instruments including the Tenor, Double Tenor, Double Second, Cello, Guitar, Quadrophonic and Bass together as an orchestral ensemble, often with expansive percussion and rhythm section.

This is a list of notable steelbands organized by country.

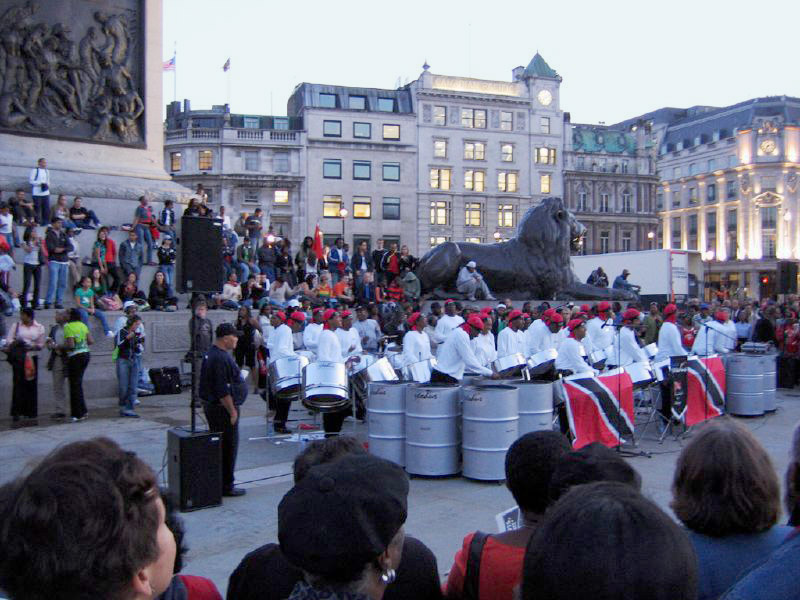
The Exodus Steelband from Trinidad and Tobago play at Trafalgar Square in the UK

== Trinidad and Tobago ==
Band	Location
Shell Invaders	Tragrete Rd, Pos
Nutrien Silver Stars	Woodbrook, Pos
Desperadoes	George St, Pos
Hadco Phase II	Woodbrook, Pos
Proman Starlift	Woodbrook, Pos
Massy Trinidad All Stars	Duke St, Pos
Bp Renegades	#138 Renegades Way, Pos
Sforzata	Curepe

== United Kingdom ==
Band	Location
CSI	London
Mangrove	London
Ebony	London
Metronomes	London
Endurance Steel Orchestra	London
Nostalgia	London
Croydon Steel Orchestra	London
Pan Nation Steel Orchestra	London
Steelasophical Steel Band Dj	Buckinghamshire
Milnthorpe Steel Band	Milnthorpe, Cumbria
Real Steel	Plymouth, Devon
Steelasophical Steel Band Dj	High Wycombe, UK
Harlow Steel Band	Harlow, Essex
KEVI Steel	Morpeth, Northumberland
Steelasophical	UK
Solid Steel	London, UK

== France ==
Band	Location
Les Allumés du Bidon (LADB Steelband)	Louverné (53)
Calyps'Atlantic	Rezé (44)
Pan'n'co Steelband	Saint-Pierre-des-Coprs (37)
Calypsociation Steelband	Romainville (93)
PanaTchao	Saint-Aubin-le-Cloud (79)
Les Allumettes	Louverné (53)
So'Calypso	Carbon-blanc (33)
