= Beetham Highway =

Highway in Trinidad and Tobago

Coordinates: 10.64468°N 61.48958°W

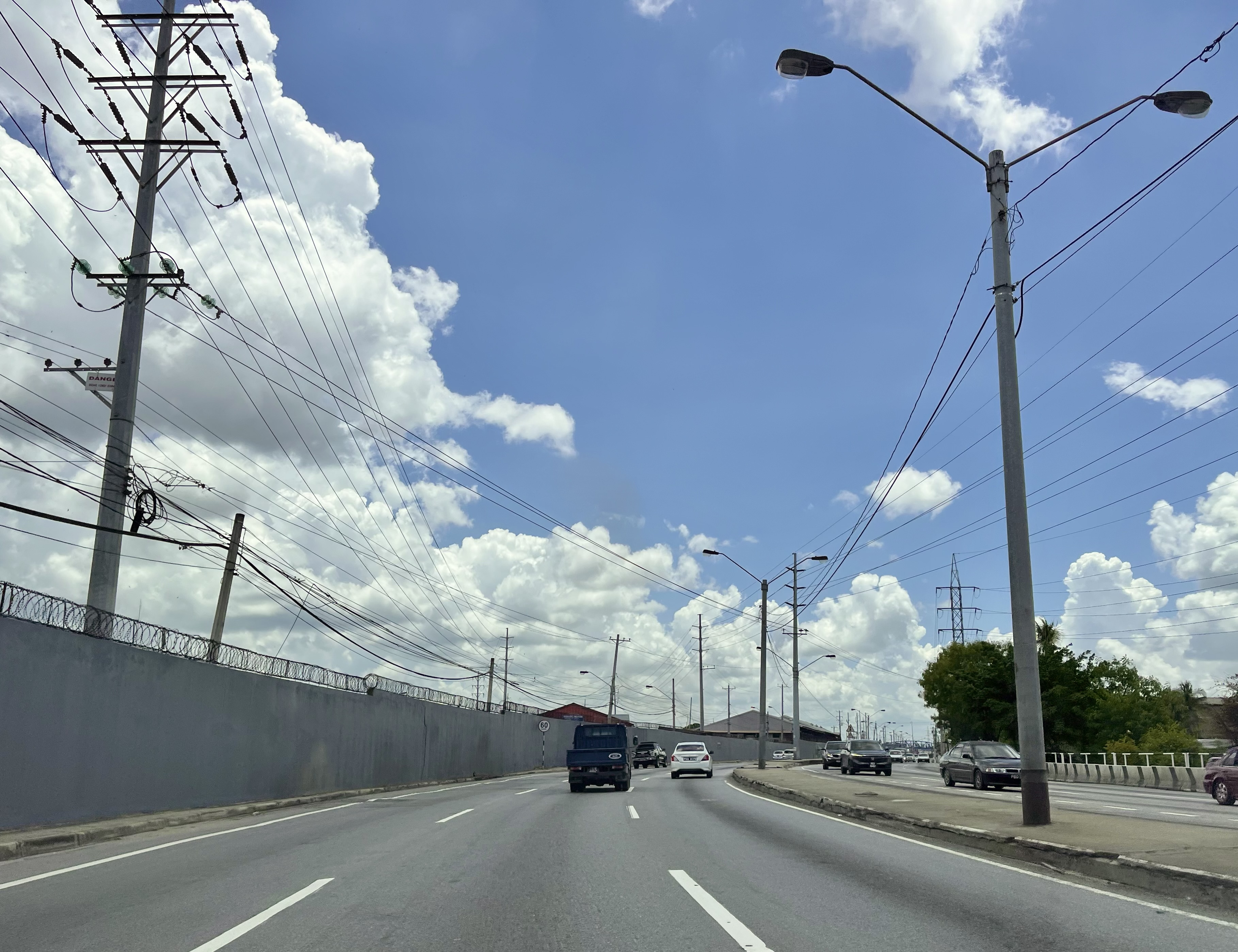

Route information
- Length: 4.8 km (3.0 mi)
- Existed: 1956–present

Major junctions
- West end: Downtown Port of Spain
- East end: Barataria, San Juan

Location
- Country: Trinidad and Tobago
- Major cities: Port of Spain, San Juan

Highway system
- Transport in Trinidad and Tobago

The Beetham Highway is a major highway in Trinidad and Tobago. It runs from downtown Port of Spain where it meets Wrightson Road to Barataria (where it connects with the Churchill-Roosevelt Highway). It was constructed between 1955 and 1956. The highway was named for former Governor Sir Edward Betham Beetham.

== Description ==
=== Route ===
The highway is fairly short, running for only 4.8 km from Barataria to Port of Spain. The highway runs alongside Beetham Gardens, an economically depressed area that is the source of many incidents on the highway. It is bounded to the south by the Caroni Swamp and Beetham Landfill.

=== Features ===
The Beetham Highway is a six lane freeway with 2 notable grade separated interchanges at Barataria and St. Joseph Road, the latter of which serves as a direct connection to Independence Square. The other two intersections on the highway are at Central Market and Broadway.

== Exit List ==
The following table lists the major junctions along the Beetham Highway. The entire route is located in Trinidad.

Region	Location	Km	Mile	Exit	Destinations	Notes
Port of Spain		0.0	0.0	—	Wrightson Road – Port of Spain General Hospital	Western terminus; Continuation from Port of Spain
Port of Spain		0.1	0.062	1	Broadway	Traffic Lights
Port of Spain		0.4	0.25	2	Pioneer Drive	Westbound access only
San Juan–Laventille	Port of Spain	0.6	0.37	3	Production Drive, Abattoir Road	Traffic Lights
San Juan–Laventille	Port of Spain	1.3	0.81	4	Saint Joseph Road	Westbound exit and eastbound entrance
San Juan–Laventille	Port of Spain	3.1	1.9	5	Beetham Landfill	Westbound access only
San Juan–Laventille	San Juan	4.8	3.0	—	Churchill Roosevelt Highway – San Juan, Tunapuna, Arima, Sangre Grande – Piarco International Airport	Eastern Terminus; freeway continues east into San Juan–Laventille as the Churchill Roosevelt Highway
1.000 mi = 1.609 km; 1.000 km = 0.621 mi: Closed/former; Concurrency terminus; Incomplete access; Tolled; Route transition; Unopened

== Incidents ==
In January 2009, world boxing champion Giselle Salandy died after a car crash at Beetham Highway.

On 4 July 2022, a large blockage occurred on the highway due to protests against a police related shooting that resulted in the deaths of three residents. The Eastern Main Road, Priority Bus Route and Lady Young Road were blocked concurrently.
