= Churchill–Roosevelt Highway =

Highway in Trinidad and Tobago

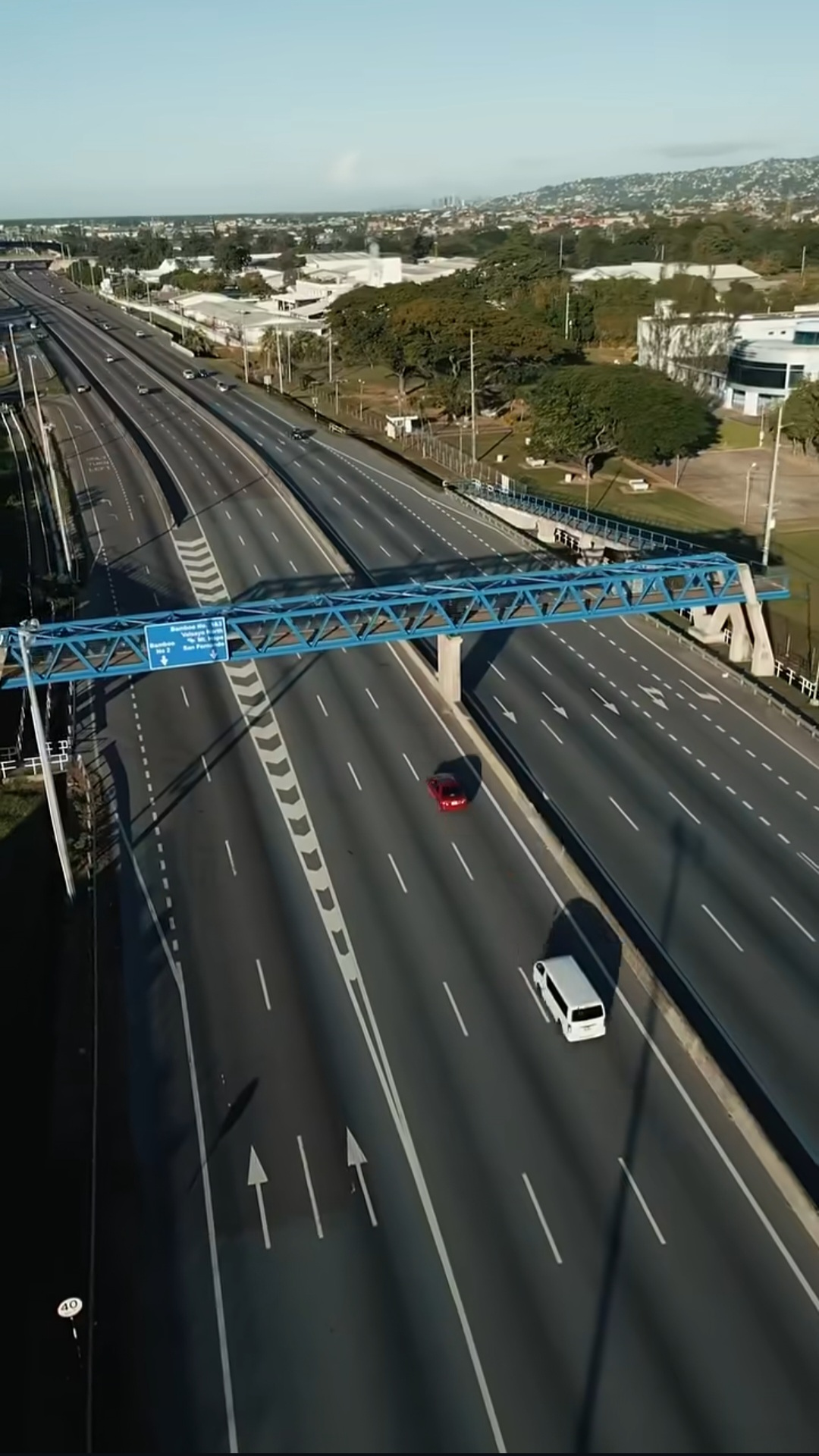

Route information
- Length: 35 km (22 mi)
- Existed: March 1942–present

Major junctions
- West end: Barataria, San Juan
- Valsayn
- East end: Wallerfield

Location
- Country: Trinidad and Tobago
- Major cities: Arima, Tunapuna, San Juan, Sangre Grande (soon)

Highway system
- Transport in Trinidad and Tobago

The Churchill–Roosevelt Highway, sometimes refers to as CRH, is the major east–west highway on Trinidad island in Trinidad and Tobago.

It runs for 35 km (22 mi) from Barataria in the west (where it joins the Beetham Highway) to Wallerfield in the east (south-east of Arima) where it ends in the former US Army base on Fort Read. It crosses the north–south Uriah Butler Highway (UBH) at Valsayn. Constructed during World War II to connect the US Army base with Port of Spain, the highway was named for the two wartime leaders, Winston Churchill and Franklin D. Roosevelt.

Construction began in December 1941 and was completed in March 1942. Originally reserved for the US armed forces, the road was turned over to the Government of Trinidad and Tobago on 24 October 1949.

== Description ==
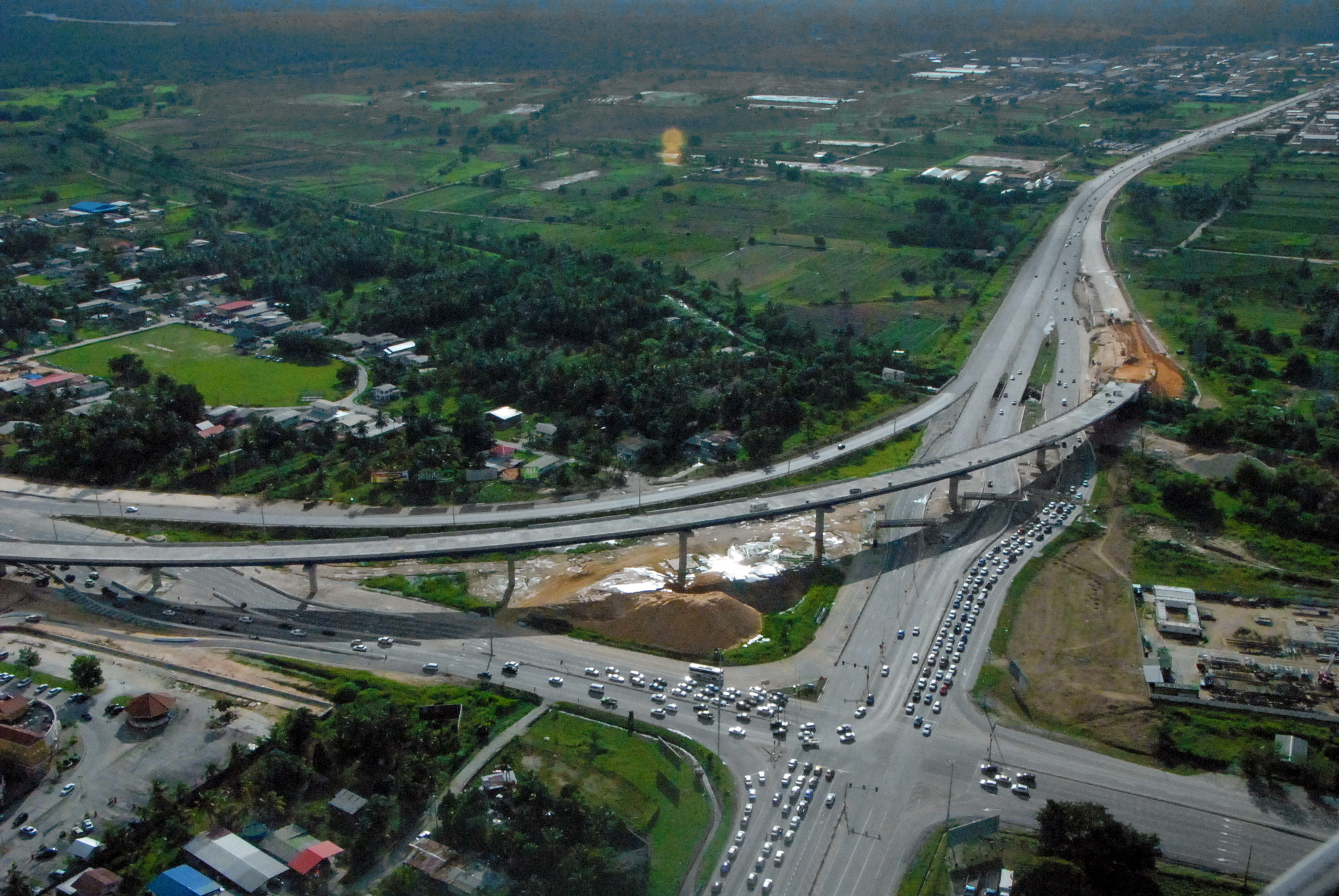
An intersection of Churchill–Roosevelt Highway and Uriah Butler Highway, 2009

The Churchill–Roosevelt Highway can be considered the most important highway in the country, running alongside the densely populated East-West Corridor, with an estimated population of 600,000. Because of this, it is often extremely congested.

=== Route ===
The Churchill-Roosevelt highway begins at the Barataria interchange, where it becomes the Beetham Highway heading west into Port of Spain. The highway then passes south of San Juan and through El Socorro/Aranguez. Soon after the Aranguez overpass, the highway intersects with the north-south Uriah Butler Highway just west of Valsayn. The highway continues eastwards past Curepe, St. Augustine, Tunapuna and Trincity. At the Piarco intersection, BWIA Boulevard provides direct access to the Piarco International Airport, south of the highway. The highway then continues past Maloney, Mausica and Arima. The highway terminates at a junction with Antigua Road in Wallerfield.

=== Features ===
Despite being one of the most important highways in the country, it is not entirely grade separated. Every major intersection after Curepe is signalized, leading to gridlock traffic congestion during peak times. The Barataria interchange connects to Morvant and Barataria via a connector road, while the Aranguez and Curepe interchanges are simple overpasses. The Grand Bazaar interchange is the largest and most important of the interchanges on the entire highway system, where it crosses the Uriah Butler Highway.

The highway is a six lane dual carriageway from Barataria to Mausica, and then narrows to four lanes before terminating at Wallerfield. However some sections of the highway contain additional lanes and divided frontage roads. At the Grand Bazaar interchange, the underpass is two lanes westward and three lanes eastward with the north to west and east to south ramps respectively carrying two lanes each, hence there being as many as nine lanes on the highway at this point. There is also a frontage road on the eastbound lane from Valpark to Grand Bazaar, which provides access to Bamboo No. 2 and 3, as well as the exits to the northbound and southbound lanes of the Uriah Butler Highway from the east. At this point, the highway carries as much as ten lanes due to an additional two lanes on the westbound lane for merging purposes. At the Curepe interchange, divided frontage roads also add to the number of lanes, with as much as ten lanes. After these major interchanges, additional lanes are only joined to the highway at junctions for turning or merging.

There are nine pedestrian overpasses along the course of the highway between Barataria and Arima.

=== Exit list ===
The following table lists the major junctions along the Churchill–Roosevelt Highway. The entire route is located in Trinidad.

Region	Location	Km	Mile	Exit	Destinations	Notes
San Juan–Laventille	San Juan	4.8	3.0	—	Beetham Highway – San Juan, Port of Spain, Diego Martin	Western terminus; Continuation from San Juan. Kilometer-based exit numbers continue from the Beetham Highway
San Juan–Laventille	San Juan	4.82	3.00	6	Lady Young Road	
San Juan–Laventille	San Juan			7	Don Miguel Road	North access from CRH eastbound only. South access from CRH westbound only.
San Juan–Laventille	San Juan			8	El Socorro Ext. Road #1, Sadhoo Trace, Chanka Trace	Access from CRH westbound only.
San Juan–Laventille	San Juan			9	Oudan Road	Access from CRH eastbound only.
San Juan–Laventille	San Juan			10	El Socorro Road, El Socorro Ext. Road #2, Aranguez/El Socorro Access Road	North access from CRH eastbound only. South access from CRH westbound only.
San Juan–Laventille	San Juan			11	Cyrus Trace	Access from CRH westbound only.
San Juan–Laventille	San Juan			12	Chootoo Road	Access from CRH westbound only.
San Juan–Laventille	San Juan	8.1	5.0	13	Aranguez Road, Samaroo Road, Garden Road	
San Juan–Laventille	Valsayn	9.4	5.8	14	Uriah Butler Highway – Chaguanas, Couva, San Fernando – Eric Williams Medical Sciences Complex	Interchange with Uriah Butler Highway
Tunapuna–Piarco	Valsayn			15	Cipriani College	Access from CRH eastbound only.
Tunapuna–Piarco	Valsayn			16	Prince Charles Avenue	Access from CRH eastbound only.
Tunapuna–Piarco	Valsayn			17	Morequito Avenue	Access from CRH westbound only.
Tunapuna–Piarco	Valsayn			18	Queen Elizabeth Avenue	Access from CRH eastbound only.
Tunapuna–Piarco	Valsayn			19	Taguaria Road	Access from CRH westbound only.
Tunapuna–Piarco	Curepe	11.5	7.1	20	Southern Main Road	
Tunapuna–Piarco	Saint Augustine			21	Evans Street	Access from CRH eastbound only.
Tunapuna–Piarco	Saint Augustine	12.8	8.0	22	University of the West Indies; College Street	Temporary traffic lights
Tunapuna–Piarco	Tunapuna			23	Stratham Lodge Road	Access from CRH eastbound only.
Tunapuna–Piarco	Tunapuna	13.8	8.6	24	Pasea Main Road	Temporary traffic lights
Tunapuna–Piarco	Tunapuna			25	Centenary Street	North access from CRH eastbound only. South access from CRH westbound only.
Tunapuna–Piarco	Macoya	14.7	9.1	26	Macoya Road	Temporary traffic lights. To be replaced by interchange.
Tunapuna–Piarco	Macoya			27	Tissue Drive	Access from CRH eastbound only.
Tunapuna–Piarco	Tacarigua	16	9.9	28	Orange Grove Road	Temporary traffic lights. May be replaced by interchange.
Tunapuna–Piarco	Tacarigua			29	Savannah Drive	Access from CRH eastbound only.
Tunapuna–Piarco	Trincity			30	Beaulieu Avenue	Access from CRH eastbound only.
Tunapuna–Piarco	Trincity	18	11	31	Trincity Central Road	Temporary traffic lights. To be replaced by interchange.
Tunapuna–Piarco	Piarco			32	Exposition Drive	Access from CRH eastbound only.
Tunapuna–Piarco	Piarco	19.9	12.4	33	– Piarco International Airport; BWIA Boulevard; Golden Grove Road	Temporary traffic lights. To be replaced by interchange.
Tunapuna–Piarco	Piarco			34	Piarco Old Road	Access from CRH eastbound only.
Tunapuna–Piarco	Arima			35	Maloney Boulevard	Access from CRH eastbound only.
Tunapuna–Piarco	Arima			36	Santa Barbara's Primary School	Access from CRH westbound only.
Tunapuna–Piarco	Arima	23.6	14.7	37	Mausica Road	Temporary traffic lights. May be replaced by interchange.
Tunapuna–Piarco	Arima			38	Andrew Lane, Signature Boulevard	North access from CRH eastbound only. South access from CRH westbound only.
Tunapuna–Piarco	Arima			39	Santa Rosa Race Course	Access from CRH westbound only.
Arima		25.8	16.0	40	O'Meara Road – Arima Hospital	Temporary traffic lights. To be replaced by interchange.
Arima				41	De Freitas Road	Access from CRH westbound only.
Arima		28.1	17.5	42	Tumpuna Road	Temporary traffic lights. To be replaced by interchange.
Tunapuna–Piarco	Arima			43	Pinto Road	Temporary traffic lights.
Tunapuna–Piarco	Arima	30.3	18.8	44	Demarara Road	Temporary traffic lights.
Tunapuna–Piarco	Arima			45	Cumuto Road	Temporary traffic lights. To be replaced by interchange.
Tunapuna–Piarco	Arima	34.8	21.6	46	Antigua Road	Eastern temporary terminus
Sangre Grande	Cumuto			47	Cumuto Road	Future interchange on new freeway to be constructed
Sangre Grande	Sangre Grande			48	Eastern Main Road	Future interchange on new freeway to be constructed
Sangre Grande	Sangre Grande			49	Ojoe Road – Sangre Grande Hospital	Future interchange on new freeway to be constructed
Sangre Grande	Sangre Grande	55	34	50	Toco Main Road	Future Eastern temporary terminus
1.000 mi = 1.609 km; 1.000 km = 0.621 mi: Closed/former; Concurrency terminus; Incomplete access; Tolled; Route transition; Unopened

== History ==
When WWII commenced, Trinidad became an important strategic point in the war effort. Through the Bases Agreement signed by British prime minister Churchill and US president Roosevelt, Britain got 50 old American destroyers, and the US was granted the right to establish bases in the British Territories. Although the US Army had several bases on the island by 1941, the most important were Chaguaramas and the Air Base at Wallerfield, called Fort Read. The road communications between the Port of Spain (POS) and Fort Read near Cumuto was difficult as it consisted solely of the crowded Eastern Main Road, which slowed down the large convoys moving between the two bases. The decision was made in 1941 to build a military two lane paved road between Fort Read and the Morvant Junction of the Eastern Main Road just outside POS (the extension of the highway, the Beetham Highway, was not built until the 1950s.)

Work began almost immediately, with the highway bisecting rural communities like St. Augustine, El Socorro and Tacarigua. Many crop farmers had to be moved as bulldozers ploughed the course. This era in history is documented in Samuel Selvon's classic novel, A Brighter Sun, where an inexperienced Indian youth is thrust headlong into the highway-building process. When the road was opened in 1942, it was the finest road in the island, being smooth and pothole free from end to end. It was not immediately asphalted, as it was pressed into service for the convoys almost as soon as the way was graded (a stark contrast to the island's roads today). Wilson Minshall, father of masman Peter Minshall, remarked “The new Roosevelt–Churchill Highway has swept across the country from Cumuto to a point near Laventille with the force of a flood rushing into a quiet valley. Cleared and graded but not yet surfaced, its naked earth weaves and interweaves protesting patterns under the wheels of army trucks and construction tractors that cannot wait until the road is finished.

Opened in 1942 and reserved exclusively for military traffic, with exceptions being made for top-ranking civil service personnel. Military police in jeeps constantly patrolled the 15 mile road looking for violators.

The highway was finally opened up for civilian use on 4 October 1949.

== Auxiliary routes ==
- EMR/CRH Link/Lady Young Road South - This route provides access to Lady Young Road, an alternative route into Port of Spain, and the Eastern Main Road at Barataria.
- Aranguez/El Socorro Access Road - This route provides access to El Socorro North from the Aranguez Overpass.
- Churchill Roosevelt Highway Frontage Road - This route runs alongside the westbound lane of the highway at Valsayn, providing access to the southbound and northbound ramps and connecting Bamboo No. 2 with Grand Bazaar and the westbound lane of the highway.

== Planned extensions and upgrades ==
There are currently plans to extend the Churchill–Roosevelt Highway from Wallerfield to Manzanilla as a fully grade separated four-lane expressway. These plans have begun with the widening of the highway from Mausica to Maloney to six-lanes, and construction of the section that bisects the Aripo Savanna.

Much of the highway suffers from congestion due to an aging collection of traffic lights on most major junctions. There are plans to convert the entire highway into a grade separated expressway including the construction of new interchanges. Notable are the Uriah Butler Highway interchange just west of Valsayn and the Curepe Interchange at the intersection with the Southern Main Road.
