= Priority Bus Route =

Highway in Trinidad and Tobago

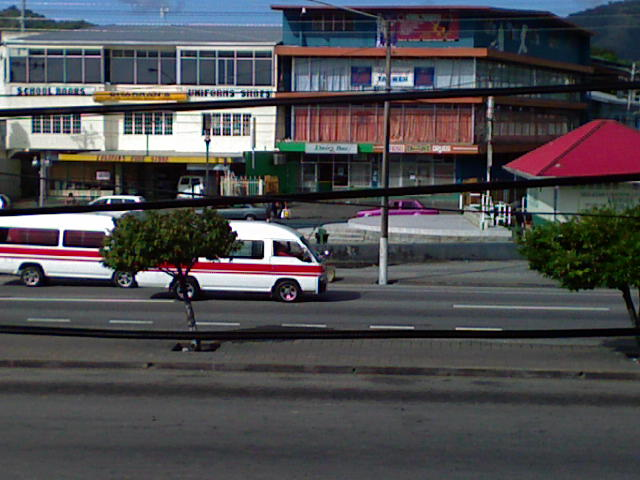
The Priority Bus Route in San Juan

The Priority Bus Route (or PBR) is a public transit corridor roadway on Trinidad island in Trinidad and Tobago.

It is dedicated for use only by buses, maxi taxis, and emergency vehicles. Other vehicles can only use this road if the owner possesses a special pass. At times the bus route is opened or partially opened to light motor vehicles in response to heavy traffic, road works or traffic diversions.

== Route ==
The route serves the East–West Corridor metro region, from the city of Port of Spain from the west, to the borough of Arima to the east.

It was built on the right of way of the former Trinidad Government Railway line. The Priority Bus Route is parallel to the public Eastern Main Road. It is approximately 24 km long.
