= UBH =

UBH is an abbreviation for:

- Unbihexium, symbol Ubh: element 126, a hypothetical chemical element
- United Behavioral Health, the behavioral health subsidiary of medical insurer UnitedHealth Group
- Uriah Butler Highway
