= Beetham Estate Gardens =

Neighbourhood in Trinidad and Tobago

Coordinates: 10°38′43″N 61°29′52″W

Beetham Estate Gardens is a neighbourhood in the twin island republic of Trinidad and Tobago. It is located south of Laventille and northeast of Sea Lots. It is bordered from west to east by the Beetham Highway and the Eastern Main Road and falls under the administration of Trinidad's capital city, Port- of- Spain. Formerly, a slum called "rat town", the community has evolved as a residential area but is still rife with systemic violence and is a clear example of environmental discrimination. In 2008–9 the government, under the leadership of the late Patrick Manning, built a 1.20-meter-high (3.9 ft) wall around the area in preparation for the 5th Summit of the Americas.
