= Valsayn =

Town in Trinidad and Tobago

Coordinates: 10°39′N 61°25′W

Valsayn is a town in Trinidad and Tobago. It is located along the East–West Corridor in northern Trinidad between the Eastern Main Road, Uriah Butler Highway, Churchill–Roosevelt Highway and Curepe. Valsayn consists of a small number of luxury residential communities divided between Valsayn-North and Valsayn-South, as well as settlements on the outskirts on the southern side of the highway, such as Bamboo Settlement on the West and Spring Village on the East. It is one of the most expensive residential areas on the island. Among its inhabitants are political figures, businessmen and foreign investors. The Valpark Shopping Plaza is one of the oldest shopping malls in Trinidad and Tobago.

It is also the site of Cipriani College of Labour and Co-Operative Studies, the Valsayn campus of the University of Trinidad and Tobago, the factory of Nestlé Trinidad and Tobago Limited, and has two licensed radio broadcasters, Radio 90.5 and Heartbeat 103.5.

== Valsayn Park ==
Valsayn Park is the upscale residential portion of Valsayn. It consists of Valsayn Park North and Valsayn Park South, the boundaries of which meet at and are delimited by the Churchill–Roosevelt Highway. The western portion of Valsayn Park North is referred to as Jamboree or Jamboree Park, named after a large scouting jamboree that took place there in 1961. The eastern portion of Valsayn Park South is referred to as Realspring or Realspring Gardens. Generally, the lot sizes in Jamboree and Realspring are smaller than in other parts of Valsayn.

== Architecture ==
The architectural heritage of Valsayn Park is spotty and incoherent. The original stock of houses were built in the "modern" ranch style, typified by low slope shed roofs, concrete vent blocks, in situ terrazzo floors and stock aluminum sliding doors. Some were architecturally designed, influenced by contemporary developments in North America during the forties, fifties and sixties. Most however, were designed by owners and contractors working loosely in that mode, with those elements and features, to varying degrees of success. As tastes and trends changed in the seventies and eighties, in step with the booming oil-based economy, the more modest homes of the fifties and sixties were joined by lavishly designed mansions, occupied by the wealthy business class of citizens. Over the decades it has become one of the most expensive neighbourhoods to live in.
