= Solo Beverage Company =

Soft drink manufacturer in Trinidad and Tobago

- Company type: Ltd.
- Industry: Non-alcoholic beverage
- Genre: Beverages
- Founded: 1949 in Port of Spain, Trinidad and Tobago
- Founder: Joseph Charles
- Headquarters: San Juan, Trinidad and Tobago
- Key people: Ken Charles (MD)
- Website: www.solobev.com

Solo Beverage Company, also known as Joseph Charles Bottling Works and Investments Ltd., is a soft drink manufacturer in Trinidad and Tobago.

== History ==
The company was founded by Joseph Charles (born Serjad Makmadeen), who was born in 1910 in Princes Town to Makmadeen, a Punjabi Muslim who emigrated from Punjab in then British India to Trinidad, and his wife Rosalin Jamaria, a Dougla (mixed Indian and African heritage) who emigrated from Martinique. It is currently still owned by the Charles family and is located on the Churchill Roosevelt Highway in San Juan.

== Products ==
- Solo Apple J: apple spritzer
- Solo Pear J: pear spritzer
- Royal Crown cola (under licence)
- Diet Royal Crown cola (under licence)
- Upper 10: lemon & lime lemonade (under licence)
- Solo Bentley: carbonated lime lemonade
- Diet Solo Bentley
- Solo Apple, Guava, Mango, Banana, Orange, Pineapple, Grape, and Sorrel: sugared juices
- Solo Kola Champagne, Ginger Ale, Ginger Beer, Grape, and Cream Soda: soft drinks
- Aqua Pure Water
