= 2018 Trinidad and Tobago floods =

- Date: October 19, 2018
- Location: Trinidad and Tobago

The 2018 Trinidad and Tobago floods were a series of over-bank floods and flash-floods occurring in the twin-island Caribbean nation, Trinidad and Tobago. These events followed consistent rainfall on Friday 19 October 2018 and intermittent rainfall on Saturday 20 October 2018. Rivers in Caroni, Diego Martin and Maraval breached their banks. Several communities were evacuated as homes and vehicles were flooded; many areas were inaccessible. Flooding along the Caroni Plain caused the submersion of a major part of the Uriah Butler Highway. The south-bound lane of this highway was temporarily closed to vehicular traffic. The north-bound lane was temporarily used for two-way traffic, permitting only large SUVs and heavy-T vehicles. Flight services out of Piarco International Airport were temporarily disrupted.

== Rainfall and Met Office warnings ==
Consistent rainfall persisted throughout the day on Friday 19 October 2018. Trinidad and Tobago is located on the band of the Inter Tropical Convergence Zone (ITCZ), making it prone to over-bank river flooding, flash flooding, and landslides following extreme and erratic rainfall. The Trinidad and Tobago Meteorological Service (TTMS) upgraded the Riverine Flood Alert level from orange to red. Citizens were advised then to secure themselves and their property and execute emergency evacuation procedures.

== Flooded roads and highways ==
The following table (incomplete) shows some of the roadways and highways that were affected.

Flooded Roads and Highways in Trinidad and Tobago due to the October 2018 rainfall and flooding.
ROADWAY	STATUS
Ann Avenue (Vicinity of Diego Martin)	Flooding Reported
Arima Blanchisseuse Road	Trees Fallen.
Bassie street (Vicinity of Valsayn)	Partially Flooded
Caroni Southbank Road	Flooded
Cunapo Southern Road	Landslips. Road blocked at some points. Flooding in some areas.
Diego Martin Main Road	Partially Flooded
Dookiesingh Street (Vicinity of St Augustine)	Partially Flooded
Eastern Main Road (Vicinity of Manzanilla)	Previously Flooded.
Eastern Main Road (Vicinity of Sangre Grande)	Previously Flooded.
Garnet Road, between Emerald Drive and Gopaul Avenue (Vicinity of Diego Martin)	Flooding Reported
Golden Grove Road (Vicinity of Piarco International Airport)	Flooded
Heights of Aripo	Five landslips.
Kiskadee Walk (Vicinity of River Estate, Diego Martin)	Flooding Reported
Madras Road (Vicinity of St. Helena)	Flooded
North Coast Road	Fallen Trees and Landslips.
North Oropouche Road and Fishing Pond Road	Flooding subsiding
Northpost Road (Vicinity of Diego Martin)	Partially Flooded
Paria Road	Landslips cleared from 55 km to 61 km.
Piarco Bypass Road	Flooded
Saddle Road (Vicinity of Maraval)	Flooding Reported
Sinai Street (Vicinity of Diego Martin)	Flooding Reported
Sienna Leone Road (Vicinity of Diego Martin)	Flooding Reported
Trantrill Road (Vicinity of St Augustine & Caroni)	Flooded
Uriah Butler Highway (Vicinity of Caroni) North-bound lane	Partially Flooded.
Uriah Butler Highway (Vicinity of Caroni) South-bound lane	Completely Flooded.
Warrenville Road (Vicinity of Cunupia)	Flooded
Washington Junction to Warren Road	Flooded

== Landslides and landslips ==
The following table shows a list (not yet complete) of landslides/landslips that have occurred.

Landslides and Landslips in Trinidad and Tobago due to the October 2018 rainfall and flooding.
Where	Vicinity
Second Trace	Bagatelle
Big Yard	Carenage
Seaview Gardens	Carenage
Upper Quarry Street	Covigne Richplain
Northpost Road	Diego Martin
Celestine Trace, Moka Boisse No II	Maraval
Faustin Trace, Moka Boisse No II	Maraval
La Sieva, Moka Boisse No II	Maraval
Moraldo Street, Moka Boisse No II	Maraval
Phillip Trace, Le Platte Village	Maraval
