= Cipriani College of Labour and Co-operative Studies =

Public university in Trinidad and Tobago

Coordinates: 10.63485°N 61.42315°W

Cipriani College of Labour and Cooperative Studies (CCLCS)
- Motto: Knowledge, Responsibility, Courage
- Type: Public university
- Established: February 22, 1966
- President: Andre Vincent Henry
- Location: Valsayn, Trinidad and Tobago
- Campus: Valsayn Campus, South Campus - Plesantville, Tobago Campus,
- Website: www.cclcs.edu.tt

The Cipriani College of Labour and Cooperative Studies (CCLCS) is a public university located in Trinidad and Tobago. The CCLCS was established in 1966 and its main campus is located in Valsayn but there are satellite locations in San Fernando and Tobago. The college is named in honor of the labour leader Arthur Andrew Cipriani.

== History ==
CCLCS was initially established to provide trade union training and worker education, conduct seminars and courses and other related activities in the field of Industrial Relations and to undertake research in Labour issues and problems. The Cipriani Labour College Act, No.4 of 1972, provides the legal framework for the functioning of the College. Over the period of time the curriculum has expanded to cover areas such as Co-operative Studies, Occupational Safety and Health, Human Resource Management, Project Management, Environmental Management, Security Administration and Management, and Emergency Management. CCLCS is accredited by Accreditation Council of Trinidad and Tobago (ACTT)
