= Racism in Trinidad and Tobago =

The island nation of Trinidad and Tobago is a place of tension between Afro-Caribbeans and Indo-Caribbeans. Around 39% of Trinidadians are of African descent, 40% are of Indian descent and a small population is of European descent. Africans usually live in urban areas, notably the East–West Corridor, and Indians usually live in the rural areas surrounding the sugar cane plantations.

According to W. Chris Johnson, in 1973, a secret wing of Trinidad and Tobago's police administration went to war against an equally-shadowy group of youthful people called the National United Freedom Fighters. On September 13, 1973, Beverly Jones, a soldier of the NUFF was killed in a firefight with Trinidad and Tobago's force. Revolutionary young girls and women like Jennifer, Althea, and Beverley Jones battled gender violence and racism that assembled both with and against anti-imperialist movements in which black men in tradition "set the agenda and stole the show."
