= Trinidad and Tobago Chess Championship =

Chess tournament in Trinidad and Tobago

The Trinidad and Tobago Chess Championships are the annual individual National Chess championships of Trinidad and Tobago. Although chess was being played in Trinidad and Tobago from 1922 or earlier, the first men's tournament took place in 1937.

Christo Cave is the player with the most wins to his credit, having won 13 titles. However, several other players have managed to pull off multiple wins: Ryan Harper has 9 titles, George E. C. Stanford has 6, Frederick Edward Brassington has 5, Fred Sabga has 4, Carl Brown, and Shawn Tavares each have 3 titles, and Isaiah McIntosh has 2 titles.

There is also an annual National Women's Championship. Aditi Soondarsingh has won a record nine titles.

NOTE: The table below lists only the years when tournaments took place. There were no chess tournaments in Trinidad and Tobago in 1938, 1940, 1941, 1943, 1960, 1962, and 1963.

| Year | National Men's Champion |
|---|---|
| 1937 | George E. C. Stanford |
| 1939 | Dr. Aldwyn G. Francois |
| 1942 | Ralph Bersodi Jr |
| 1944 | Dr. R. O. Young |
| 1945 | Dr. Maxwell G. Sturm |
| 1946 | George E. C. Stanford |
| 1947 | Dr. Maxwell G. Sturm |
| 1948 | George E. C. Stanford |
| 1949 | Rene Pratt, H.A. Mc Shine, George E. C. Stanford |
| 1950 | Rene Pratt |
| 1951 | Frederick Edward Brassington |
| 1952 | Tournament Unfinished |
| 1953 | Carl Brown |
| 1954 | Frederick Edward Brassington |
| 1955 | Eric Callender |
| 1956 | Frederick Edward Brassington |
| 1957 | Eric Callender |
| 1958 | Frederick Edward Brassington |
| 1959 | Carl Brown |
| 1961 | Frederick Edward Brassington |
| 1964 | Arnold Ramon-Fortune |
| 1965 | George E. C. Stanford |
| 1966 | Fred Sabga |
| 1967 | Carl Brown |
| 1968 | Arnold Ramon-Fortune |
| 1969 | George E. C. Stanford |
| 1970, 1971, 1972 | Fred Sabga |
| 1973 | Arthur Rudy Mohipp |
| 1974 | Arthur Rudy Mohipp |
| 1975 | John Raphael |
| 1976 | Arthur Morris |
| 1977 | Kwame Payne |
| 1978 | Cecil Lee |
| 1979 | Arthur Morris |
| 1980 | Courtney Lee |
| 1981 | Edward Duchesne |
| 1982 | Shawn Tavares |
| 1983 | Franklyn Pierre |
| 1984 | Cecil Lee |
| 1985 | Yogendranath Ramsingh |
| 1986, 1987 | Shawn Tavares |
| 1988 | Yogendranath Ramsingh |
| 1989 | Edward Duchesne |
| 1990, 1991, 1992, 1993 | Christo Cave |
| 1994 | Anderson Gordon |
| 1995, 1996, 1997, 1998, 1999, 2000, 2001 | Christo Cave |
| 2002 | Ryan Harper |
| 2003, 2004 | Christo Cave |
| 2005, 2006, 2007 | Ryan Harper |
| 2008 | Ravishen Singh |
| 2009 | Marcus Joseph |
| 2010, 2011 | Ryan Harper |
| 2012 | Frank Yee |
| 2013 | Ryan Harper |
| 2014 | Vishnu Singh |
| 2015 | Kevin Cupid |
| 2016 | Ryan Harper |
| 2018 | Adrian Winter Atwell |
| 2019 | Isaiah McIntosh |
| 2022 | Ryan Harper |
| 2023 | Isaiah McIntosh |
| 2024 | Joshua Johnson |
| 2025 | Quinn Cabralis |

== List of women's champions ==
| Year | National Women's Champion |
|---|---|
| 1982 | Ayodele Moheni |
| 1983 | Ayodele Moheni |
| 1984 | Marylin Geoffroy |
| 1985 | Ayodele Moheni |
| 1986 | Ayodele Moheni |
| 2002 | Desire Derrick |
| 2003 | Desire Derrick |
| 2004 | Aditi Soondarsingh |
| 2005 | Chantal Fitzpatrick |
| 2006 | Aditi Soondarsingh |
| 2007 | Aditi Soondarsingh, Jane Kennedy |
| 2008 | Aditi Soondarsingh |
| 2009 | Aditi Soondarsingh |
| 2010 | Aditi Soondarsingh |
| 2011 | Aditi Soondarsingh |
| 2012 | Aditi Soondarsingh |
| 2013 | Javanna Smith |
| 2014 | Gabriella Johnson, Javanna Smith, Shannon Yearwood |
| 2015 | Aditi Soondarsingh |
| 2016 | Gabriella Johnson |
| 2018 | Gabriella Johnson |
| 2022 | Obdulis Hermoso Rodriguez |
| 2023 | Zara La Fleur |
| 2024 | Ysvett Hermoso Rodriguez |
