= Aditi Soondarsingh =

Trinidadian chess player (born 1988)

Personal information
- Born: 1988 (age 37–38) Barataria, Trinidad and Tobago

Chess career
- Country: Trinidad and Tobago
- Title: Woman Candidate Master (2014)
- FIDE rating: 1687 (November 2018)
- Peak rating: 1867 (October 2008)

Aditi Soondarsingh (born 1988) is a women's chess player from Barataria, Trinidad and Tobago. Soondarsingh is the National Women's Chess Champion, having won the Women's half of Trinidad and Tobago Chess Championship eight times.

She holds the FIDE title of Woman Candidate Master and has represented Trinidad and Tobago as the Board 1 player at a number of World Chess Olympiads. In 2012, Soondarsinngh became the first women's chess player from Trinidad and Tobago and the second English caribbean speaking women's player to defeat a Women's International Master at a major team tournament.

Soondarsingh has represented Trinidad and Tobago at the World Youth Championship in France. She has also played in tournaments in El Salvador, Barbados, Venezuela, and in India for the Commonwealth Games.
