= Manzanilla Beach, Trinidad and Tobago =

Beach in Trinidad and Tobago

Manzanilla Beach
- Interactive map of Manzanilla Beach
- Location: Trinidad and Tobago
- Nearest town: Sangre Grande
- Coordinates: 10.507284°N 61.042915°W
- Operator: Sangre Grande
- Status: Open all year
- Designation: Public beach

Manzanilla Beach is a beach in Trinidad and Tobago. Located on the east coast of Trinidad, the larger island, the beach sits directly on the Manzanilla Bay adjoined to the larger north Atlantic Ocean.

== Etymology ==
The word manzanilla is the diminutive form of the Spanish word for apple, manzana. The beach was so named by early Spanish settlers, who encountered what they thought were apple trees with small fruit. They were in fact the manchineel tree, bearing toxic fruit that closely resembles apples. The name of the area was still maintained even after the arrival of the British in 1797.

== History ==
Largely uninhabited until 1822, Manzanilla beach saw new settlers when Governor Ralph Woodford brought soldiers of the West India Regiment in the area. The reason for this settlement was twofold: firstly, because the regiment was composed mainly of Black soldiers and wished to avoid the incidence of runaway slaves hiding among the Black soldiers and secondly, the Governor wished to promote the development of a roadway from Arima to the east coast.

These soldiers were each given sixteen acres of land which they developed with their families by growing rice and ground provisions. These agricultural productions were so large that wastage was a common feature of their lands and also because of the infrequency that the round-island steamer collected their produce.

These soldiers were underpaid and slighted by their employer, the government at the time. In fact, in an attempt to ameliorate conditions, the government used the soldier's own retirement pension to provide better facilities for the village.

By 1839, the village consisted only of one medical officer, one police officer, a superintendent and a Mico Charity School for the village children.

In 1841, three years after the abolition of slavery in 1838, the Governor at the time, Sir Henry MacLeod had sent Reverend J.H. Hamilton on a mission to report about the situation in Manzanilla. The Reverend, although more concerned about his proselytizing ambitions, did report that there were about five Mandingo priests and a horrible track between Arima and Manzanilla.

The residents of the area later developed cocoa and coffee and by 1898, the problem of transport of goods was solved with the introduction of the railway to neighboring Sangre Grande.

As a result of an agreement between Sir Winston Churchill and President Franklin Roosevelt, Manzanilla village served as a base of operations in the Caribbean for American soldiers in World War II in 1942. The area was established as a training camp for the army, where American soldiers trained in jungle warfare before being deployed in the region.

== Tourism ==
As one of the most sparsely populated areas on the island, Manzanilla has become a choice tourism destination for visitors seeking a quieter and less commercial beach experience. There are a few resorts, such as the Coconut Cove, that cater to tourists visiting the region for leisure. Despite its appeal as an attraction, Manzanilla is infamous for its consistently rough waters and dangerous undercurrents during high tide.

The beach is also known as a hatching site of the local leatherback sea turtle. Due to the abundance of these nests, Manzanilla beach has caught the attention of eco-tourists as a destination for turtle-watching.
