= Christo Cave =

Trinidadian chess player (born 1961)

Personal information
- Born: 19 December 1961 (age 64) Tunapuna, Trinidad

Chess career
- Country: Trinidad and Tobago
- Title: FIDE Master (2006)
- FIDE rating: 2142 (March 2010)
- Peak rating: 2296 (January 2000)

Christo Cave (born 19 December 1961) is a chess player from Tunapuna on the island of Trinidad, in Trinidad and Tobago. Cave is a former National Chess Champion and holds the record of thirteen wins in the Trinidad and Tobago Chess Championship.

He is a FIDE Master (FM) and has represented Trinidad and Tobago as the board 1 player at a number of World Chess Olympiads. In 2006, he became the first chess player from the English speaking Caribbean to defeat an International Grandmaster at a major team tournament. He has also won several chess competitions locally.

After a short hiatus due to the illness of a family member, Cave returned to competitive chess in 2011.
