= Ryan Harper (chess player) =

Trinidadian chess player (born 1977)

Personal information
- Born: 29 March 1977 (age 49) Port of Spain, Trinidad and Tobago

Chess career
- Country: Trinidad and Tobago
- Title: FIDE Master (2000)
- Peak rating: 2309 (January 2018)

Ryan Harper (born 1977) is a chess player and coach from Port of Spain, Trinidad and Tobago. Harper is a nine time Trinidad and Tobago Chess Championship National Champion.

He is a FIDE Master (FM). As of 2013 Harper is one of the top-ranked chess player in his country.

He has won numerous chess competitions locally and a number of competitions abroad.

He achieved his highest rating of 2309 in January 2018 maintaining his top ranking in Trinidad and Tobago at that time. Although his rating has dropped since then he maintains a national ranking among the top 10 players.
