= Eintou Pearl Springer =

Trinidad and Tobago writer, librarian and cultural activist (born 1944)

- Born: 24 November 1944 (age 81)
- Other name: Pearl Eintou Springer
- Occupations: Poet, playwright, librarian and cultural activist
- Known for: Poet Laureate of Port of Spain, Trinidad and Tobago (2002–2009)
- Children: 3

Eintou Pearl Springer (formerly Pearl Eintou Springer) (born Cantaro village, Santa Cruz, Trinidad, 24 November 1944) is a poet, playwright, librarian and cultural activist from Trinidad and Tobago. In May 2002, she was named Poet Laureate of Port of Spain, Trinidad and Tobago.

== Background ==
Springer's work frequently deals with social issues as well as pride in her African heritage. In 2003 she retired as Director of the National Heritage Library of Trinidad and Tobago, having founded the library and been its director since October 1993. She has served as a founding member of various cultural organizations, including the Writers Union of Trinidad and Tobago, the National Drama Association of Trinidad and Tobago (NDATT), and the Caribbean Theatre Guild. As an acclaimed performer and actress, she received NDATT's 2004 Vanguard Award, and through her family company, the Idakeda Group, she explores social issues using traditional performance forms. She was honoured as Poet Laureate of Port of Spain from 2002 to 2009.

She is the author of several books, including poetry collections, for both adults and children, as well as having her writings published in a range of publications and anthologies, including Sturdy Black Bridges: Visions of Black Women in Literature (1979, edited by Roseann P. Bell, Bettye J. Parker and Beverly Guy-Sheftall), Daughters of Africa (1992, edited by Margaret Busby), and Moving Beyond Boundaries, vol. I. International Dimensions of Black Women's Writings (1995, edited by Carole Boyce Davies and Molara Ogundipe-Leslie). Springer has received acclaim for her work as a storyteller and dramatist. In 2011, her play How Anansi Brings the Drum celebrated the United Nations' International Year for People of African Descent (IYPAD) and was part of UNESCO's Youth Theatre Initiative.

Springer is the subject of a 2010 film directed and produced by Amon Saba Saakana, entitled Ida's Daughter: The World of Eintou Pearl Springer.

== Personal life ==
Springer was born in Cantaro in the Santa Cruz valley above Port of Spain, into a staunchly Roman Catholic family. She is a devotee of the Orisha-Yoruba religion. She has three children and lives in San Juan, Trinidad, having come "to the traditional African religion as an act of political and ideological self expression." Her daughter Dara Healy is a dancer and a politician in Trinidad, and currently serves as Chairman of the Democratic National Assembly party. Writer and activist Attillah Springer is also her daughter.

== Awards ==
- 1996: Trinidad & Tobago Hummingbird Medal (Silver) for Culture
- 2004: Vanguard Award of the National Drama Association of Trinidad and Tobago (NDATT)

== Books ==
- 1986: Out of the Shadows (poetry). London: Karia Press. ISBN 0-946918-58-9
- 1987: The Caribbean: the lands and their peoples. London: Macdonald (previous ed. by Ken Campbell, 1980).
- 1991: Focussed (poetry) [S.l.]: Triangle.
- 1995: (Editor) The New Aesthetic and the Meaning of Culture in the Caribbean; the dream coming in with the rain: proceedings of the Carifesta V Symposia, Port of Spain, Trinidad, August 1992. Port of Spain, Trinidad: National Carnival Commission.
- 2000: Moving Into the Light (poetry). Kingston, Jamaica: Ian Randle. ISBN 9789766370237
- 2005: Loving the Skin I'm In (poetry). Port of Spain: Lexicon Trinidad.
- 2016: Survivor: A Collection of Plays for Children and Young Adults. Peepal Tree Press. ISBN 9789766310677.
