= ZR (bus) =

Privately-owned mini-bus in Barbados

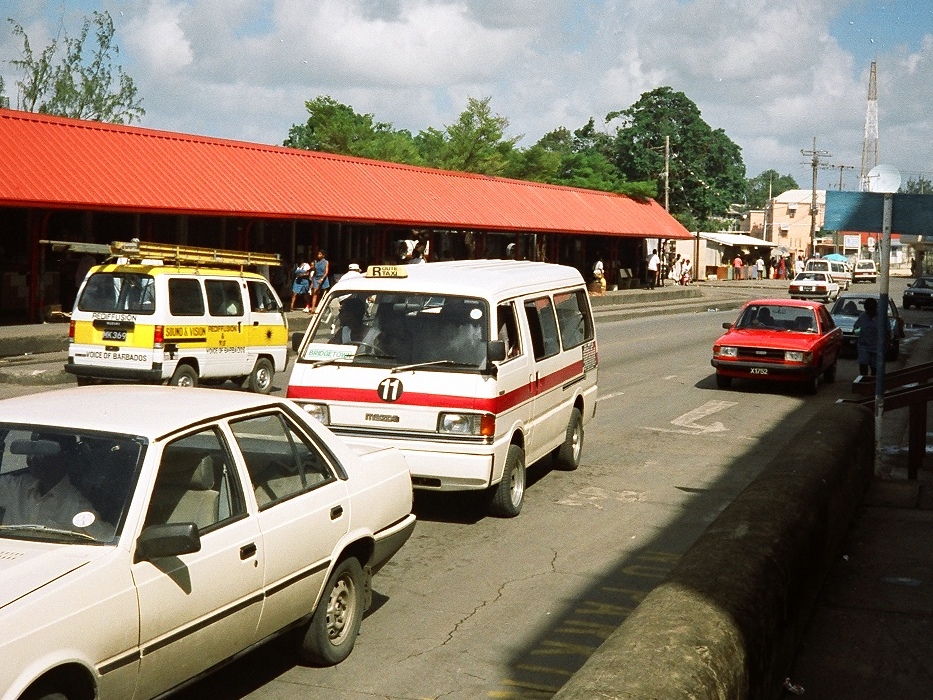
Barbados Route Taxi (ZR) for Route 11 (Bridgetown to Silver Sands via Oistins) off route in Fairchild Street, Bridgetown. (1995)

A ZR (pronounced "Zed R", formally called a route taxi) is a type of private taxi-bus system found in Barbados.

The vehicles are small vans, which mainly operate routes between the capital of Bridgetown and other terminals. They derive the name "ZR" from the license-plate code assigned to most route taxis.

ZRs have a reputation for overcrowded vans and loud music, high speeds and abrupt stops, and drivers compete intensely among each other to attract passengers. ZRs and minibuses can usually give change, while the large government-operated buses do not.

== Fares ==
ZRs charge the same fare as for the Barbados Transport Authority buses.

Current fare is BBD $3.50 and is payable in cash after boarding; change can usually be given. US dollars are usually accepted at an exchange rate of USD $1 to BBD $2 but other foreign currencies are not accepted.

== Terminals ==
ZRs have three main terminals:

- Constitution River Terminal Bridgetown (for Christ Church and parts of St Michael)
- Cheapside Terminal Bridgetown (for Saint James and parts of Saint Michael and Saint Thomas)
- Speightstown Terminal Speightstown (for St. Lucy and St. Peter)

ZRs share terminals and some routes with Minibuses, another type of private bus in Barbados.

== Routes ==
ZR routes are as listed by the Barbados Transport Authority

- 1 - Speightstown Terminal Speightstown and Six Mens, St. Peter - Crab Hill, St. Lucy
- 2 - Speightstown Terminal Speightstown, Mile & a Quarter and Indian Ground - Boscobelle, St. Peter
- 3 - Cheapside Terminal Cheapside, Eagle Hall and Black Rock, St. Michael and Wanstead, St. James - Redman's Village, St. Thomas
- 3D - Constitution River Terminal Nursery Drive, St. Michael, Oistins and Parish Land - Airport, Seawell, Christ Church
- 3W - Constitution River Terminal Nursery Drive and Jackmans, St. Michael and Proutes, St. Thomas - Sugar Hill and Airy Hill, St. Joseph
- 3Y - Cheapside Terminal Cheapside, Eagle Hall and Warrens - Jackson, St. Michael
- 4 - Cheapside Terminal Cheapside - Deacons & Grazettes, St. Michael
- 5 - Cheapside Terminal Cheapside, Bank Hall, Bush Hall, National Stadium and Green Hill - Eden Lodge, St. Michael
- 5A - Constitution River Terminal and Oistins - Six Roads & Oistins - Christ Church
- 6 - Constitution River Terminal and Station Hill - Bush Hall, St. Michael
- 7 - Constitution River Terminal and Fairfield Road - Ivy & Howells, St. Michael
- 8 - Constitution River Terminal and Culloden Road - Britton's Hill and Forde's Road, St. Michael/Christ Church
- 9 - Constitution River Terminal and Beckles Road, St. Michael, via Darrells Road - Rendezvous Gardens, Christ Church
- 9F - Speightstown Terminal Speightstown, St. Peter, Holetown, St. James, Eagle Hall and Garrison, St. Michael to Oistins Depot, Oistins, Christ Church
- 10 - Constitution River Terminal Nursery Drive, St. Michael - Silver Hill, Gall Hill and Newton, Christ Church
- 11 - Constitution River Terminal Nursery Drive, St. Michael, - Oistins and Silver Sands, Christ Church
- 12 - Constitution River Terminal Nursery Drive, St. Michael and Bournes Village - Market Hill, St. George
- 13 - Constitution River Terminal Nursery Drive, St. Michael and Charles Rowe Bridge and Ellerton - Greens & St. Judes, St. George
- 15 - Constitution River Terminal Nursery Drive and Hothersal Turning, St. Michael - Flat Rock, St. George
- 19 - Constitution River Terminal Nursery Drive and Government Hill, St. Michael - Dash Valley, St. George
- 21 - Constitution River Terminal Nursery Drive, Halls Road, Hothersal Turning and Market Hill - Horse Hill, St. Joseph
- 43 - Cheapside Terminal Cheapside, Eagle Hall, Green Hill and Warrens, St. Michael - Redman's Village and Arch Hall, St. Thomas and Lancaster, Orange Hill, Waterhall and Rock Dundo, St. James
- 61 - Constitution River Terminal Nursery Drive and Bishop's Court Hill - Pinelands & Wildey, St. Michael
- 64 - Constitution River Terminal Nursery Drive and Belmont Road, St. Michael - Six Roads. St. philp
- 88 - Cheapside Terminal and Spooner's Hill, St. Michael - Holders Hill St. James

== See also ==
- Types of buses in Barbados
- Maxi taxi
