= Barataria, Trinidad and Tobago =

Barataria
- Neighbourhood
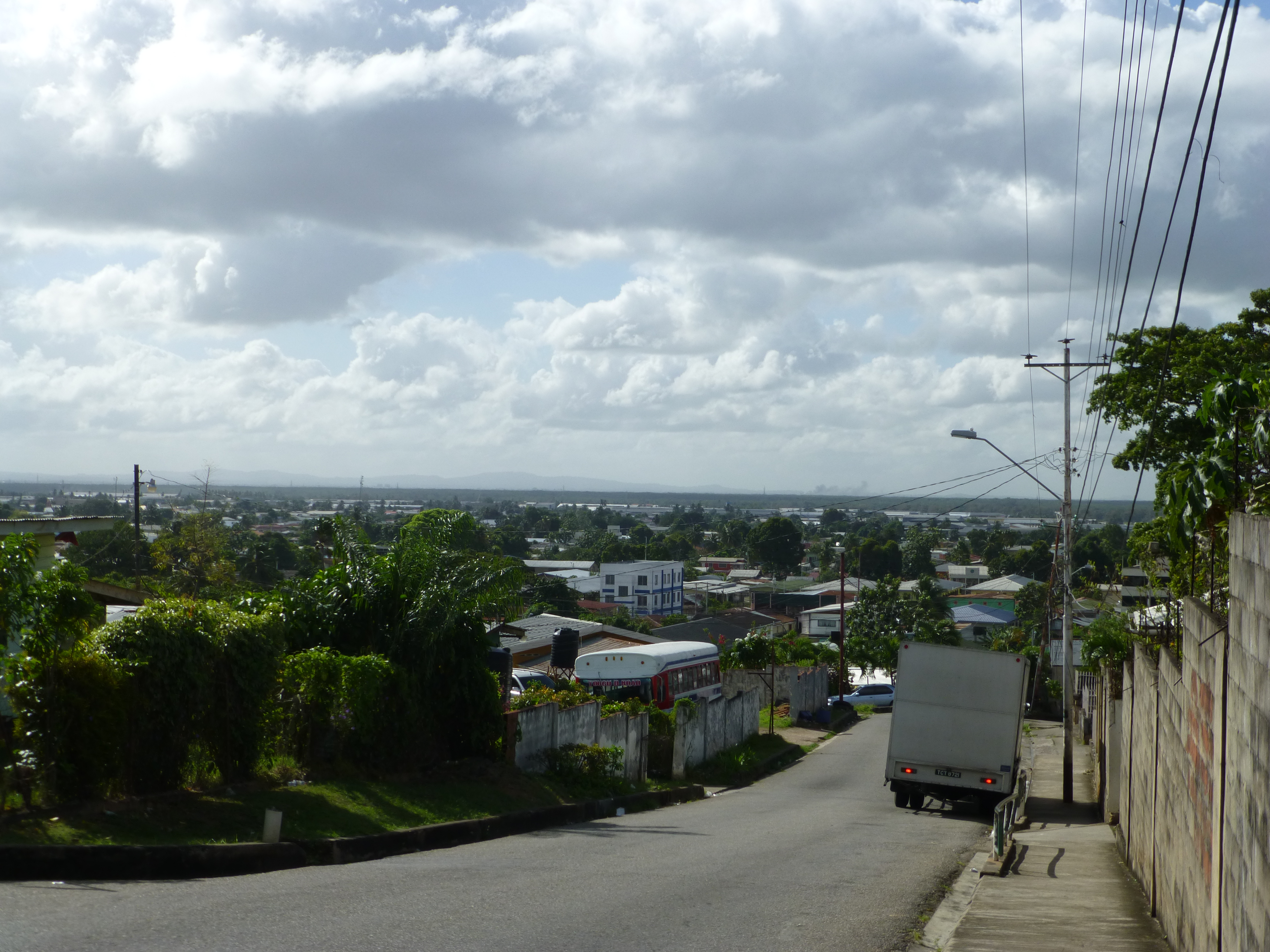

- Barataria, Trinidad and Tobago
- Coordinates: 10°39′N 61°28′W
- Country: Trinidad and Tobago
- Region: San Juan–Laventille
- Town: San Juan

Population (2011)
  - Total: 18.299
- Time zone: UTC−4 (AST)

Barataria is a neighbourhood in Trinidad and Tobago located in San Juan. It is east of Port of Spain and Laventille and west of the San Juan town centre. It is part of the East–West Corridor.

== Cityscape ==
Barataria falls under the San Juan–Laventille Regional Corporation. It is a relatively quiet residential area, home to retired and "middle classes" with streets running north–south and east–west with corresponding names, e.g. "Fifth Street". There is the usual suburban mix of churches, shops, bars and auto repair shops. It is not far from the main highways into Port of Spain direct or via the scenic Lady Young Road, and the East–West Corridor. Busy shopping areas are within walking distance. The busy bus route (maxi-taxis abound) running parallel with the eastbound highway runs next to fifth street in Barataria and the Eastern Main Road runs between second and third streets. The bus route was originally built to provide access to and from Piarco International Airport in case of a national emergency.

== Notable people ==
- Fitzroy Hoyte, cyclist
- Angela Hunte, singer
- Heather Headley, Grammy Award and Tony Award winning singer
- Aditi Soondarsingh, chess player

== Gallery ==
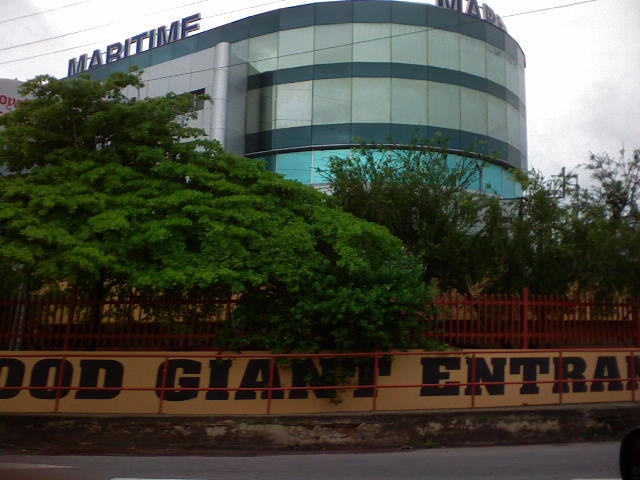
Maritime Headquarters in Barataria

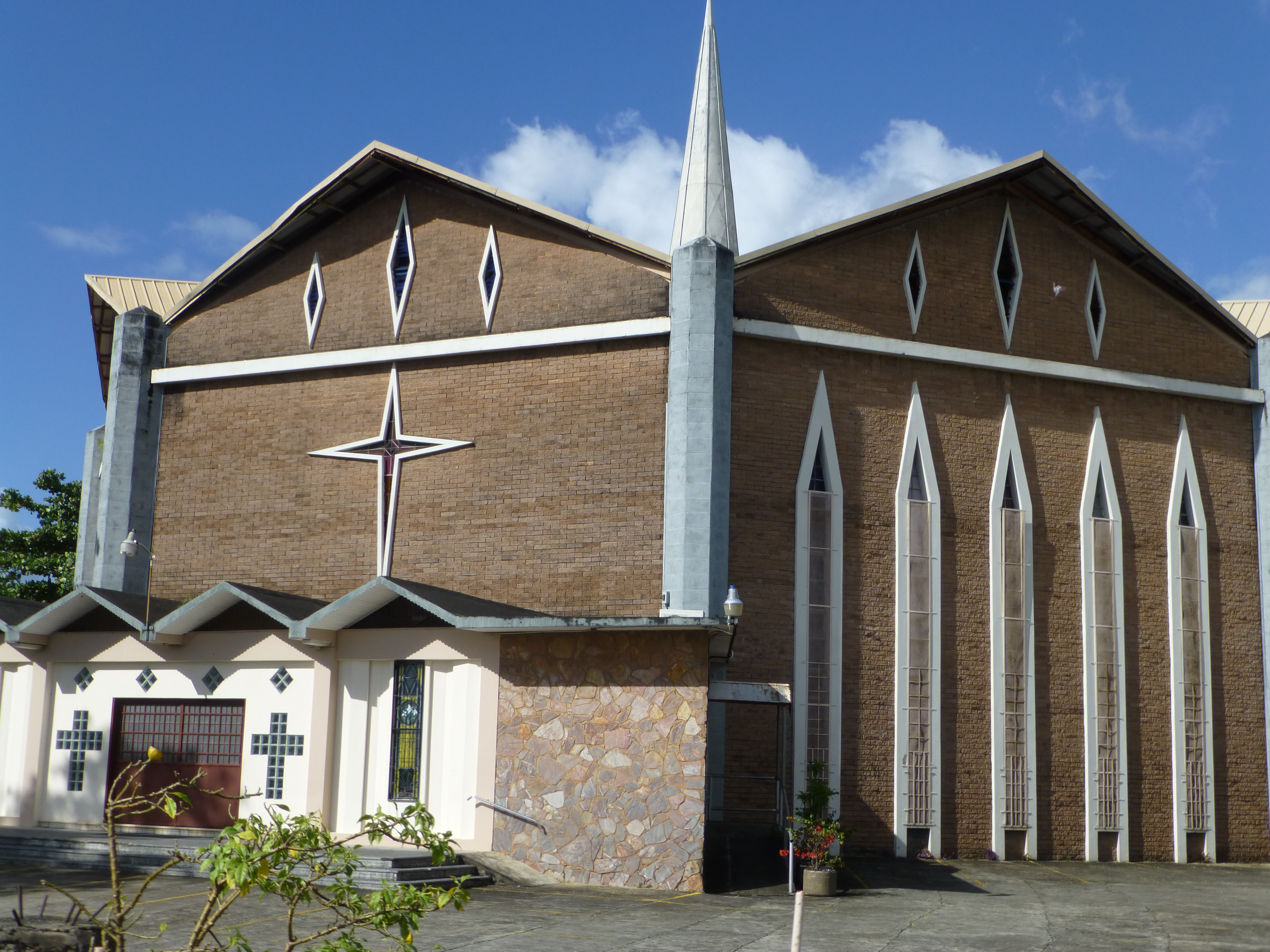
Barataria RC church
