= Santa Cruz, Trinidad and Tobago =

Santa Cruz
- Town
- Location of Santa Cruz in Trinidad and Tobago
- Country: Trinidad and Tobago
- Region: San Juan–Laventille

Santa Cruz is a town in Trinidad and Tobago. It extends across the Santa Cruz Valley, between Maraval and San Juan, along the Saddle Road. It lies between the hills of the Northern Range, a mountain range.

Formerly an important cacao bean producer, much of the valley consists of abandoned cacao plantations or small-scale agriculture. The Santa Cruz Valley is considered prime residential real estate, and many upscale residential developments like Riverside Park, have begun sprouting in the valley. Small neighbourhoods that form part of Upper Santa Cruz are Saddle Grove, Cangrejal, Jagan village, Hololo Road, Paxvale, Cantaro, Graceland Heights, Gasparillo, Sam Boucaud, La Pastora Settlement, Soconusco Settlement and Pipiol. Lower Santa Cruz consists of La Canoa and Bourg Mulatresse, commonly referred to as "Book" in local vernacular. Compared to Upper Santa Cruz, Lower Santa Cruz is more developed.

Santa Cruz is home for a few primary and secondary schools. Some primary schools include the La Pastora Government Primary School, Santa Cruz Presbyterian School, Cantaro Roman Catholic School and Bourg Mulatresse Primary School. San Juan North Secondary School is also situated in the Lower Santa Cruz Valley and it was constructed along the mountain side in Bourg Mulatresse near the Bourg Mulatresse Primary School. There are two postal delivery offices and fuel stations in Bourg Mulatresse and Cantaro. Santa Cruz is also home of a police station and a fire station. The Santa Cruz Fire Station houses the Land Search and Rescue Team, this team responds to all search and rescue calls within the Northern Division dealing with automobile accidents, fire emergencies, North Coast Road mishaps and assisting EMTs in responding to medical emergencies beyond road access.

== Notable persons ==
- Jeff Stollmeyer (1921–1989, cricketer)
- Eintou Pearl Springer (b. 1944, poet)
- Brian Lara (b. 1969, cricketer)
- Dwayne Bravo (b. 1983, cricketer)
- Darren Bravo (b. 1989, cricketer)
