= East–West Corridor =

Coordinates: 10.6445°N 61.3939°W

East-West Corridor
- Metropolitan Area
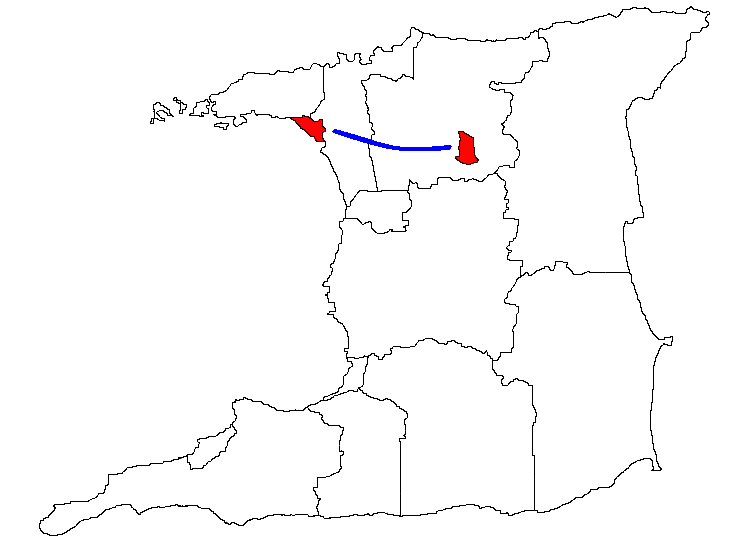
- Approximate location of East–West Corridor in blue, with Port of Spain and Arima in red.
- Interactive map of East-West Corridor
- Country: Trinidad and Tobago

Area
  - Land: 899 km^{2} (347 sq mi)

Population (2011)
  - Total: 546,014
  - Density: 607/km^{2} (1,570/sq mi)
- Combined population of Port of Spain, Arima, Diego Martin, Tunapuna-Piarco, San Juan–Laventille
- Time zone: UTC-4 (AST)
- Postal Code: 10xxxx - 36xxxx
- Area code: 868

The East–West Corridor is the built-up area of north Trinidad stretching from the capital, Port of Spain, 24 kilometres (15 mi) east to Arima. The term was coined by economist and political philosopher Lloyd Best, after gleaning the works of a technocrat named Lynette Attwell. The Corridor includes such towns as Laventille, Morvant, Barataria, San Juan, St. Joseph, Champs Fleurs, Curepe, St. Augustine, Valsayn, Tunapuna, Macoya, Trincity, Tacarigua, Arouca, D'Abadie, and El Dorado. For the most part it runs along the Eastern Main Road, between the Churchill–Roosevelt Highway and the foothills of the Northern Range. It is a densely populated and fairly congested strip of development along some of the best agricultural soils in the country.

== Gallery ==
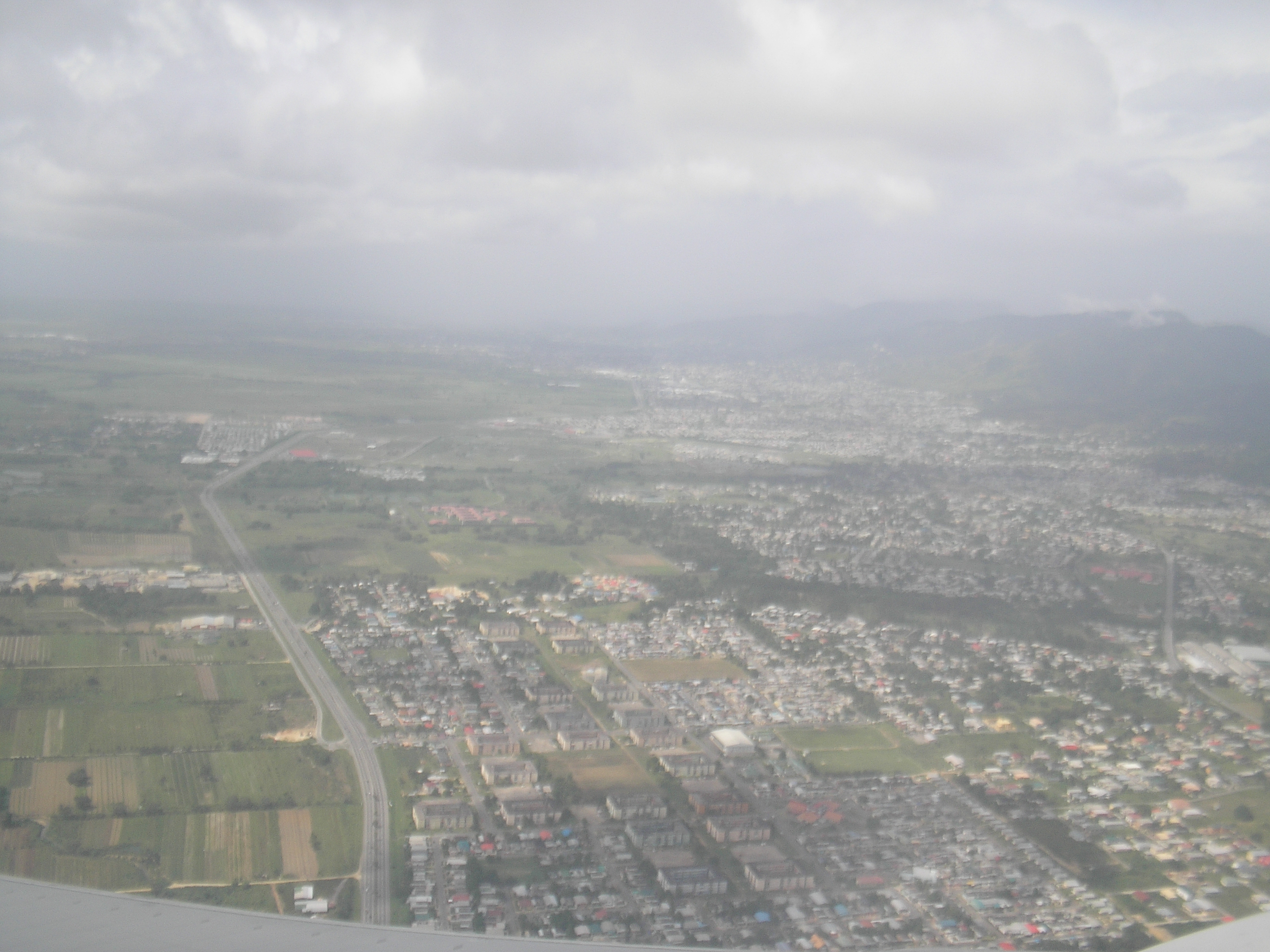
Looking west over the corridor.

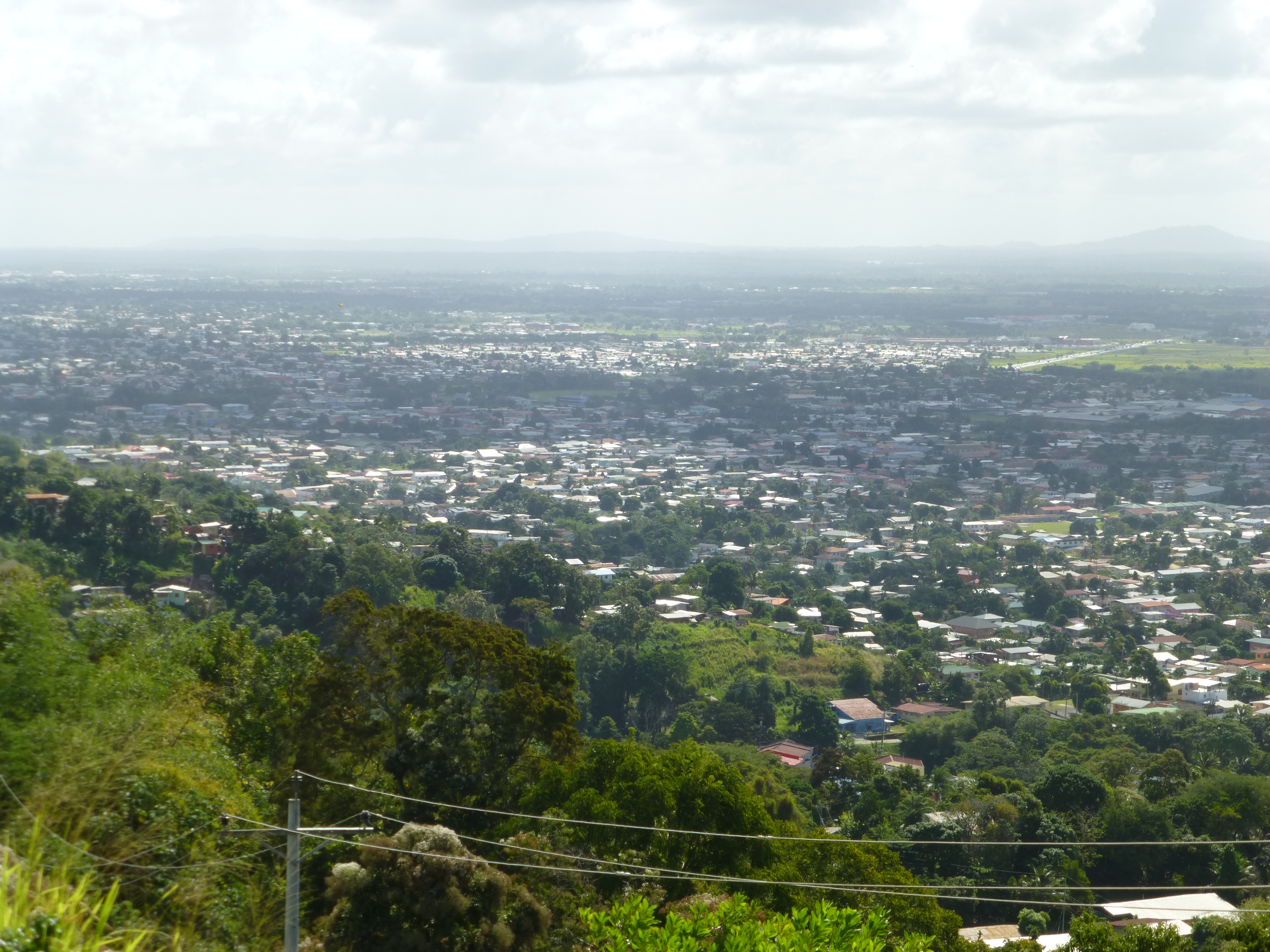
From front to back: Tunapuna, El Dorado, Tacarigua.
