= Maxi taxi =

Private, owner-operated minibus

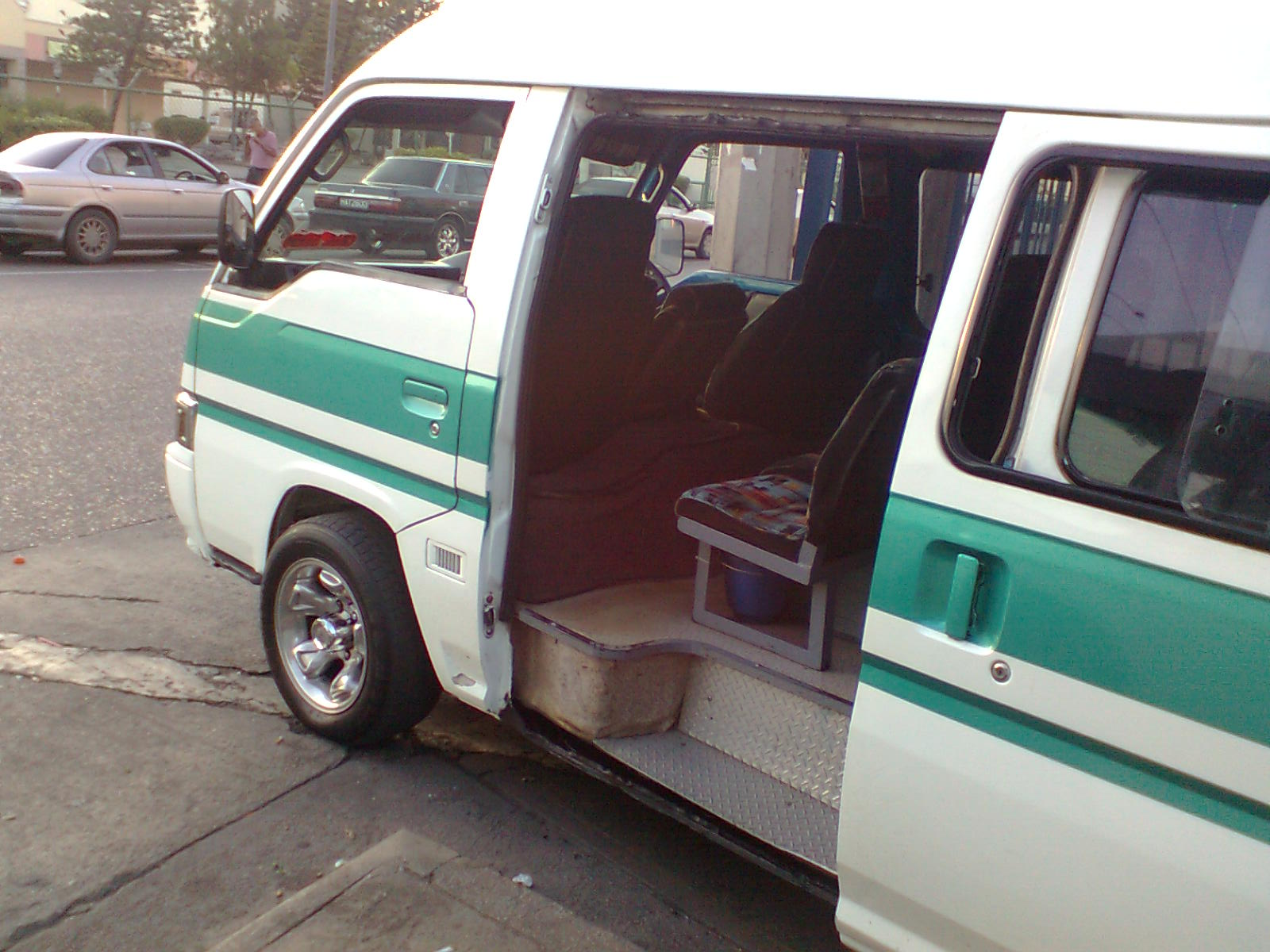
A third generation Nissan E24/Caravan operated by Maxi-taxi, servicing passengers in Couva and Chag San Fernando, Chaguanas- Curepe,Port of Spain-Chaguanas Arima-Talparo

Maxi taxis are private, owner-operated minibuses in Romania and Trinidad and Tobago that are used in public transport. They operate along fixed routes, having fixed fares and meeting points, but do not operate under a timetable. The ROUTE 3 UNIFIED MAXI TAXI ASSOCIATION a.k.a. route 3/green band maxi is the representative body 1868767-8285 in Trinidad.

== Australia ==
Similar maxi taxis are found in Australia.

A maxi taxi is a larger version of a regular taxi. While a standard taxi can usually accommodate up to 4 passengers, a Maxi-Taxi is designed to carry more people, usually up to 11 passengers. This makes Maxi Taxis great for group outings, events, or when you need more space for luggage. They provide a comfortable and spacious ride option beyond what a regular taxi can offer.

== Barbados ==
ZR buses in Barbados supplement the government-run buses.

== Philippines ==
In the Philippines, maxi-taxis are referred to in English as shuttles (Tagalog: siyatel; Cebuano: syatol).

== Romania ==
Maxi taxis are private, owner-operated minibuses that are used in public transport. They operate along fixed routes, having fixed fares and meeting points, but do not operate under a timetable.

== Trinidad and Tobago ==
The colours of each route as follows:

- Port of Spain–Arima (and onward to Sangre Grande): Red Band (G11)
- Port of Spain–Diego Martin (or Chaguaramas): Yellow Band (W11)
- Port of Spain–San Fernando (including Curepe–Chaguanas–Couva): Green Band (W18)
- San Fernando–Princes Town (and onward to Mayaro): Black Band (W21)
- South of San Fernando (Point Fortin, Cedros)–Siparia: Brown Band (W22)
- Tobago: Blue Band (G17)

The fares are paid on board and are based on distance. They come in 12 and 25 seater versions. The maxi taxi was introduced in 1978.

== See also ==
- Dolmuş, their Turkish counterpart
- Marshrutka, their Russian counterpart
