= San Juan, Trinidad and Tobago =

Town in Trinidad and Tobago

Coordinates: 10°39′N 61°27′W

San Juan
- Town
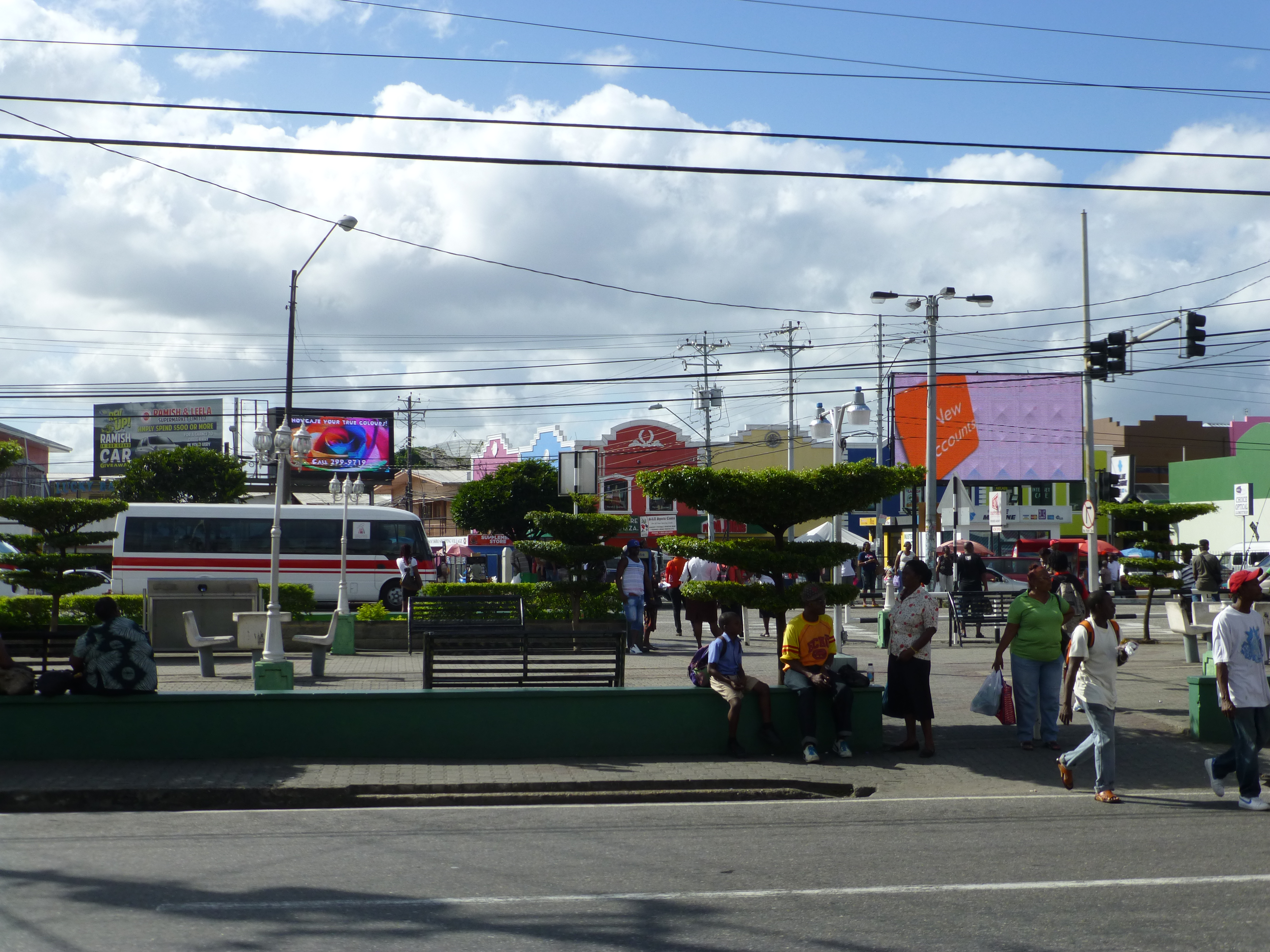
- The San Juan Croisee
- Interactive map of San Juan
- Country: Trinidad and Tobago
- Region: San Juan–Laventille
- Named for: Saint John the Baptist

Government
  - Type: San Juan-Laventille; Regional Corporation
  - Chairman: Anthony Roberts

Area
  - Total: 347.08 sq mi (898.94 km^{2})

Population (2011)
  - Total: 53,588
- Time zone: UTC−4 (AST)
- Area code: 868

San Juan (pronounced, in the local English dialect, "sah-wah") is a town in Trinidad and Tobago. Located in San Juan–Laventille region in Saint George County, it lies within the East-West Corridor Metropolitan Area, between Laventille and Saint Joseph.

== General overview ==
San Juan is governed by the San Juan–Laventille Regional Corporation. Pronounced "Sahwah" by the local people, San Juan is the first major stop along the East–West Corridor for maxi-taxis and buses. It is located 6.6 kilometres (4.1 miles) east of Port of Spain, 5.5 kilometres (3.4 miles) west of the University of the West Indies, St. Augustine campus and 17 kilometres (11 miles) away from Piarco International Airport. Its suburbs are El Socorro, Barataria, Aranguez, Bourg Mulatrese, Febeau Village and Petit Bourg. The MTS Plaza in Aranguez is the home of the San Juan–Laventille Regional Corporation. It is bordered by the Caroni Swamp in the south, Santa Cruz in the north, Barataria in the west, and Champ Fleurs in the east. The Priority Mall serves as a bus terminal for the town. The town was named after San Juan Baptista (St. John the Baptist, the patron saint of the town and namesake of the Roman Catholic Church on Cemetery Street and the Anglican church on the Eastern Main Road).

== Economy ==
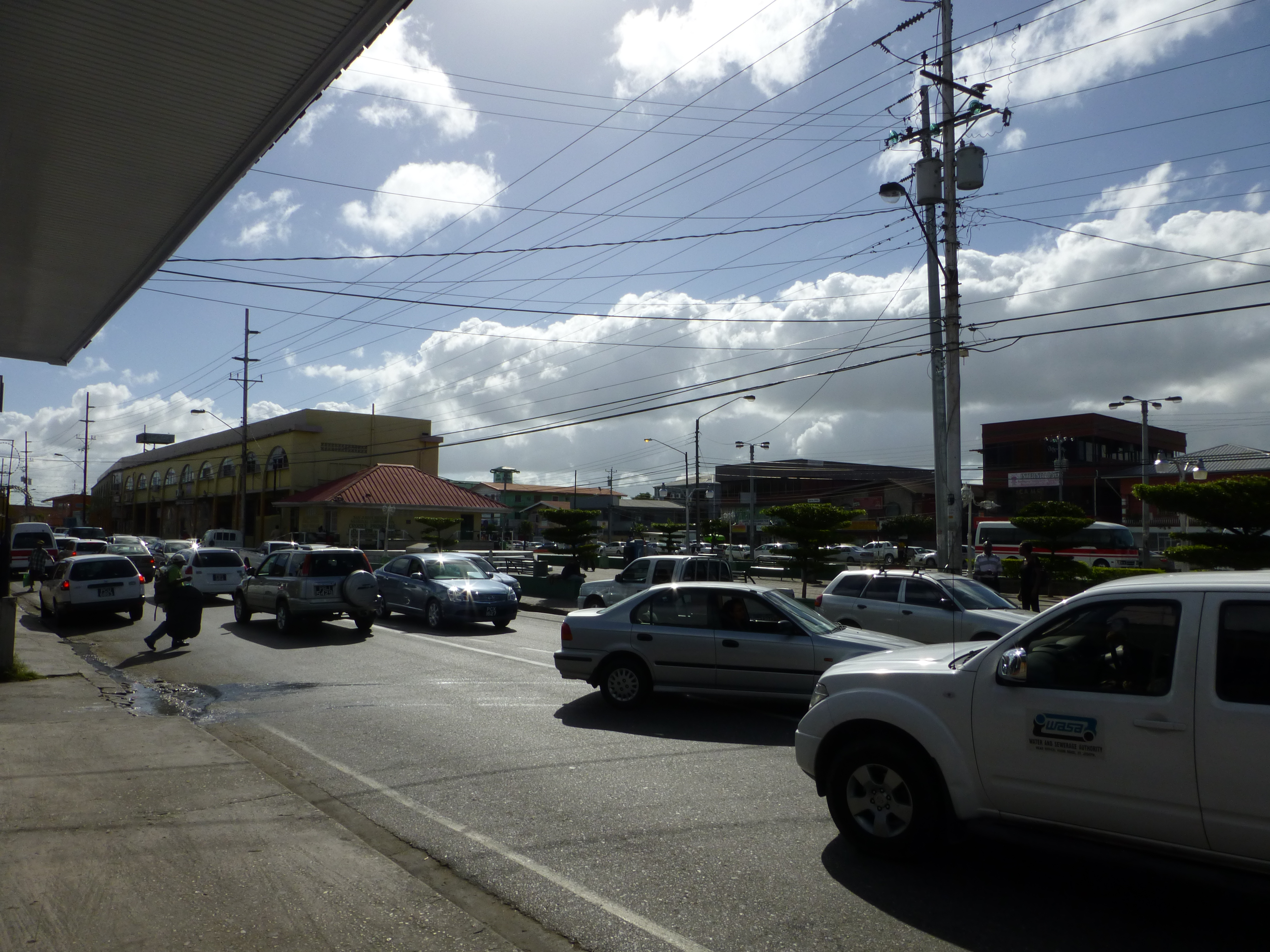
Bus terminal

San Juan is home to the internationally known beverage company Solo Beverages, which provides carbonated beverages that are considered a symbol of Trinidad and Tobago. The popular supermarket, Ramesh and Leela is headquartered in the Croisee with another branch located in Febeau Village. Also located on El Socorro Main Road, is Geelal's Super Wholesalers & Distributors Ltd, which is a major import and wholesale outlet supplying the twin islands. El Socorro Road encompasses car-parts, hardware shops, and groceries, Aranguez Main Road hosts mainly fresh fruit and vegetable shops as well as garden supply stores. The area is always bustling with traffic due to the strong economy. The many businesses located on El Socorro Road has boosted the demand of taxi services, which led to an expansion of services. The increased traffic has also allowed gas stations and auto repair shops to become successful in the area as well as many fast food restaurants.

== Entertainment ==
The local nightlife includes many pubs and bars along the main streets of San Juan. The nightlife facilities are available daily until approximately midnight, on Fridays and Saturdays nightlife goes until 5am. Aranguez is home to one of the country's most popular savannahs, Aranguez Savannah. Aranguez Savannah hosts major celebrations and events including Holi, Diwali, Eid al-Fitr, Hosay, Carnival, cricket games, and The Samaan Tree Rock Festival, among many other live concerts.

== Notable residents ==
- Mahaboob Ben Ali, businessman
- Marvin Andrews, footballer
- Sam Boodram, singer
- Satnarayan Maharaj, religious leader
- Conrad Murray, former personal physician to Michael Jackson
- Charran Singh, cricketer
- Eintou Pearl Springer, poet
- Rudolph Walker, actor

== In popular culture ==
The 2017 chutney-soca song "Ramsingh Sharma", sung by Omardath Maharaj and Raymond Ramnarine, is about an Indo-Trinidadian womanizing man from San Juan who enjoys drinking and gambling. The town is mentioned several times throughout the lyrics of the song. The song tied for first place in the 2017 Chutney Soca Monarch with Ravi Bissambhar's song "The Budget".
