= Eastern Main Road =

Highway in Trinidad and Tobago

Route information
- Length: 64 km (40 mi)

Major junctions
- West end: Port of Spain
- East end: Manzanilla

Location
- Country: Trinidad and Tobago
- Major cities: Tunapuna, Arima, Sangre Grande

Highway system
- Transport in Trinidad and Tobago

The Eastern Main Road is a major road in Trinidad and Tobago running from Port of Spain in the west to Manzanilla in the east. The towns of the East–West Corridor are strung along its route. Until the construction of the Churchill–Roosevelt Highway (in 1941) and the Beetham Highway (in 1955–56) the Eastern Main Road was the main route of travel between Port of Spain and Arima. Along much of its length, the Eastern Main Road is notoriously congested.

The Eastern Main Road began as the camino real (royal road) between Port of Spain and Tunapuna. By the 1840s it was extended to Arima, and in the 1880s it was extended to Sangre Grande, to serve the cacao-producing districts in eastern Trinidad.

== See also ==
- Priority Bus Route
