= Curepe =

Coordinates: 10°38′N 61°24′W

- Town
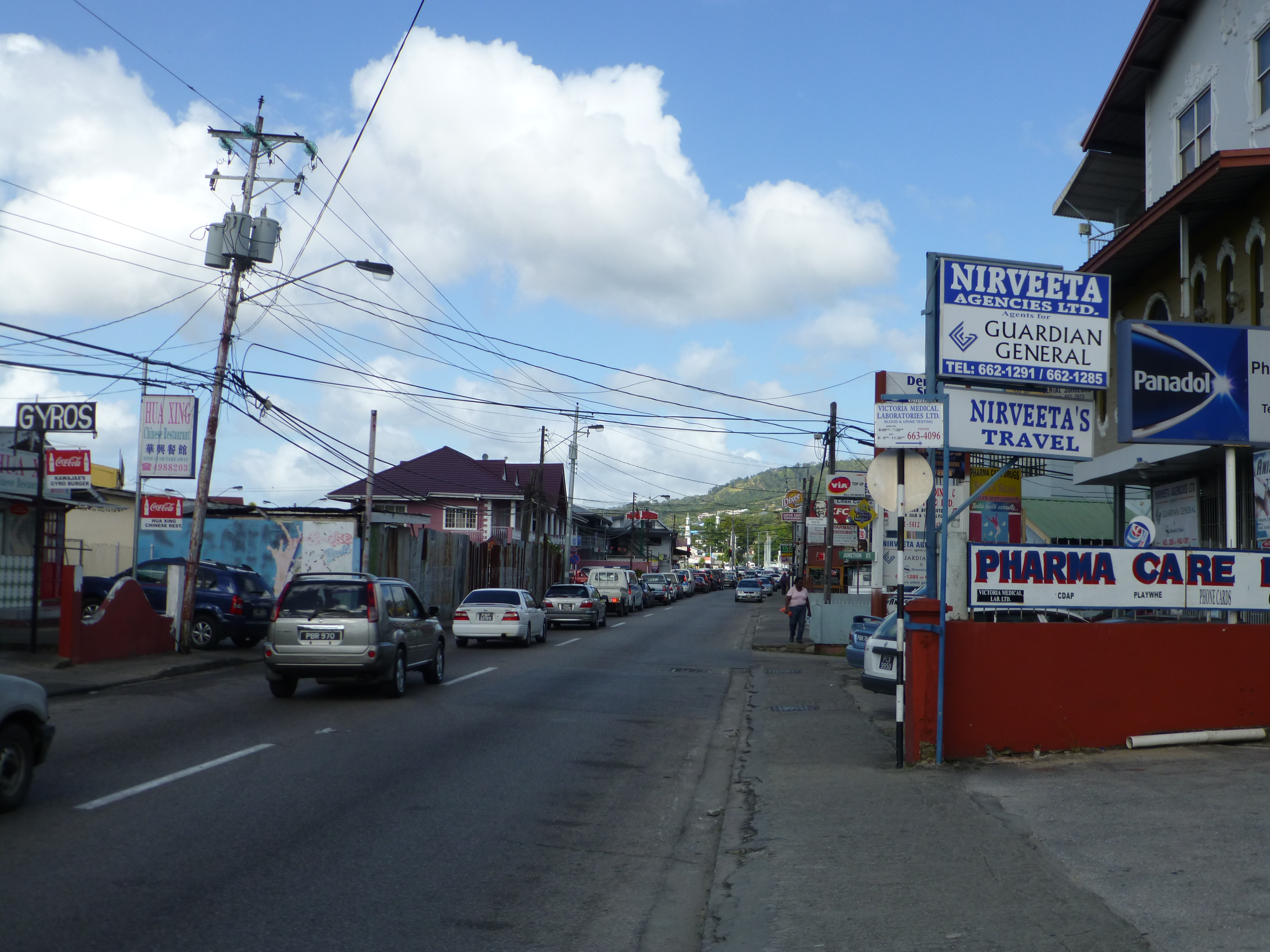
- Curepe
- Interactive map of Curepe
- Region: Tunapuna–Piarco
- Country: Trinidad and Tobago

Population (2011)
  - Total: 11,375
- Time zone: UTC−4 (AST)

Curepe) is a town in the East–West Corridor of Trinidad and Tobago. It is located west of St Augustine and east of St Joseph. Curepe adjacents the St. Augustine campus of the University of the West Indies. Many of the students attending the university live in Curepe.

Curepe began as a crossroads, where the Southern Main Road ran south. Although the Southern Main Road has largely been supplanted by highways, Curepe remains an important transportation hub for private taxis and maxi taxis which ply the route south to San Fernando and Chaguanas.

Curepe is administered by the Tunapuna–Piarco Regional Corporation.
