= Arima =

Borough in Trinidad and Tobago

- Borough
- The Royal Chartered Borough of Arima
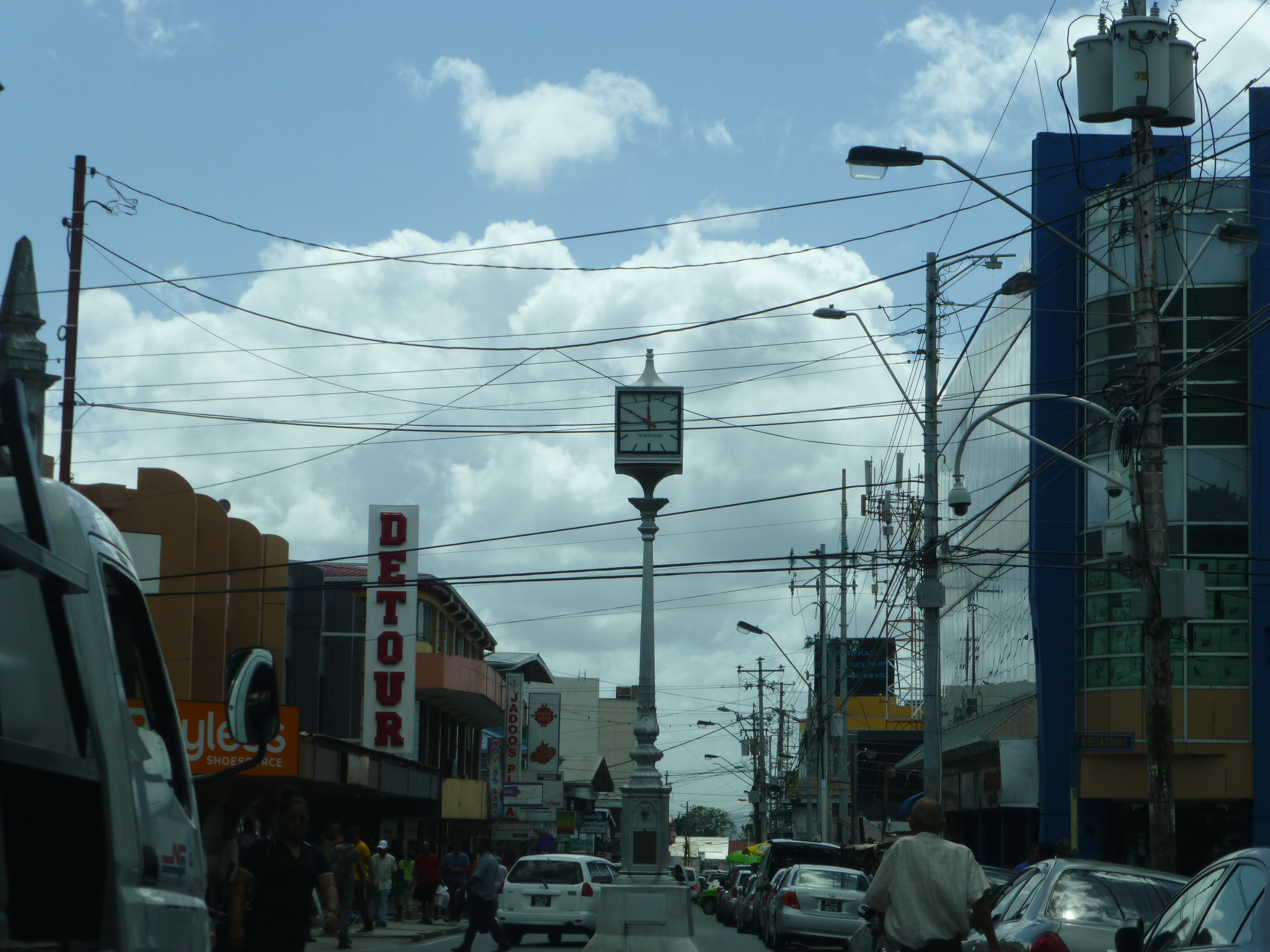
- The Dial in the Central Business District

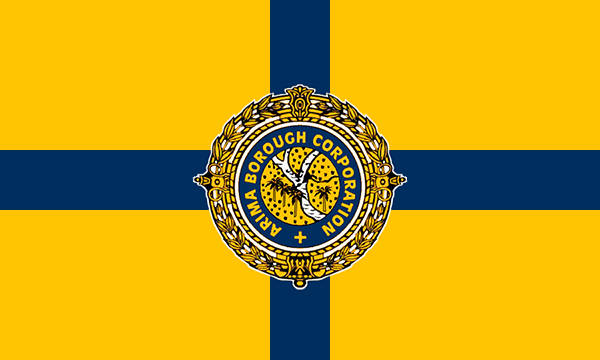
- Flag

- Location within Trinidad and Tobago Location within the Caribbean Location within North America
- Coordinates: 10°38′N 61°17′W
- Country: Trinidad and Tobago
- Jurisdiction: The Royal Chartered Borough of Arima
- Settled: 1757
- Borough: 1 August 1888
- Named for: The Arawak word for "water".

Government
  - Body: Arima Borough Corporation
  - Mayor: Baliram Maharaj, PNM
  - Deputy Mayor: Vacant
- Borough Corporation seats: 7 electoral districts
- House seats: 1/41

Area
  - Borough: 12 km^{2} (4.6 sq mi)
- Elevation: 68 m (223 ft)

Population (2011)
  - Borough: 33,606
  - Rank: 4th
  - Density: 2,801/km^{2} (7,250/sq mi)
  - Urban: 65,623
- Time zone: UTC-4 (AST)
- Postal Code: 30xxxx, 36xxxx
- Area code: 868
- ISO 3166 code: TT-ARI
- Telephone Exchange: 664, 667
- HDI The HDI for Trinidad and Tobago is 0.814, which gives the country a rank of 19th out of 177 countries with data (2007/2008) – high

Arima, officially The Royal Chartered Borough of Arima is the easternmost and second largest in area of the three boroughs of Trinidad and Tobago. It is geographically adjacent to Sangre Grande and Arouca at the south central foothills of the Northern Range. To the south is the Caroni–Arena Dam. Coterminous with the Town of Arima since 1888, the borough of Arima is the fourth-largest municipality in population in the country (after Port of Spain, Chaguanas and San Fernando). The census estimated it had 33,606 residents in 2011.

In 1887, the town petitioned Queen Victoria for municipal status as part of the celebration for the Golden Jubilee of Queen Victoria. This was granted in the following year, and Arima became a Royal Borough on 1 August 1888. Historically the third-largest town of Trinidad and Tobago, Arima is fourth since Chaguanas became the largest town in the country.

== History ==
Contrary to the belief that the city is named after the Arawak word for "water", rooted in the Arima River, it was actually named after a plant and its roots that were used for fishing by the First Peoples.

== Geography ==
=== Climate ===
The borough has a tropical rainforest climate (Köppen Af), bordering on a tropical monsoon climate, characterised with little seasonal variations due to its close proximity to the Northern Range. Temperatures typically range from 20 to 31 degrees Celsius, and annual rainfall averages around 2000 millimetres. The wet season lasts from June to November, and although there is no true dry season, there is a noticeably drier stretch from January to April. Hail has occurred in the town but is rare.

== Culture and entertainment ==
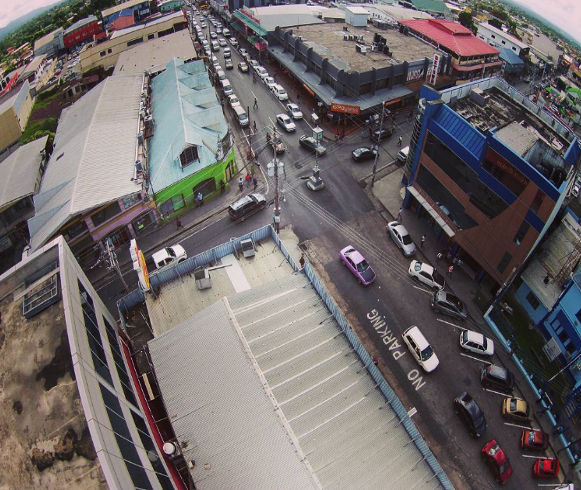

Arima hosts an annual Borough Day anniversary celebrations in August. The celebration incorporates Carnival-style street parades and usually coincides with the staging of the Santa Rosa Carib Community annual festival. The annual Arima Carnival includes street parades of masqueraders on Carnival Tuesday, J'ouvert bands on Carnival Monday, as well as a local calypso competition.

== Neighbourhoods and suburbs ==
The borough contains may communities and population centres, often named after the plantations which existed where they are now situated including:

- O’Meara
- Santa Rosa Heights
- The Crossings
- Malabar
- Tumpuna Road
- Calvary Hill
- Torrecilla Gardens
- Mt. Pleasant
- Lawrence Park
- Over The Bridge
- Jonestown
- Christina Gardens
- Gopaul Lands

== Demographics ==
=== Ancestry ===
Historical populations
Year	Pop.	±%
1980	24,112	—
1990	26,528	+10.0%
2000	28,310	+6.7%
2011	33,606	+18.7%

Borough of Arima racial breakdown
Racial composition	2011
Multiracial	38.3%
Black (Afro-Trinidadian/Tobagonian)	31.5%
South Asian (Indo-Trinidadian)	15.4%
Dougla (South Asian and Black)	7.1%
White Trinidadian	0.02%
East Asian (Chinese)	0.3%
Native American (Amerindian)	0.2%
Arab (Syrian/Lebanese)	0.06%
Other	0.14%
Not stated	6.4%

== Transportation ==
=== Highways and roads ===
The major land transportation arteries are the Churchill–Roosevelt Highway, the Eastern Main Road and the Priority Bus Route which all link Arima with major towns and cities along the East–West Corridor metropolitan area. Among other important routes are the Arima Bypass, Cocorite Street, Tumpuna Road and O'Meara Road which links neighbourhoods around the town to the Town Centre.

=== Transit ===
Arima plays an important role for north-eastern Trinidad as a multi-modal transportation hub for many of the towns and neighbourhoods on the eastern side of the island. A bus terminal provides service by the PTSC Bus network to Sangre Grande, Mundo Nuevo, Blanchisseuse, Carapo, Malabar, Morne La Croix, La Horquetta, Wallerfield, Brasso Seco and to the capital Port of Spain.

Maxi taxis (private, owner-operated minibuses) operate throughout Trinidad and Tobago as a kind of semi-public transport. They operate along fixed routes, have fixed fares and meeting points, but do not operate under a fixed schedule. These maxi taxis provide services from the town centre to Port of Spain via the Priority Bus Route and Churchill-Roosevelt Highway, making stops along the East–West Corridor. They also provide transport to Sangre Grande.

== Sports ==
The major national super-league team, FC Santa Rosa and Arima Football League, which is based at the Arima Velodrome.

The Abilene Wildcats Athletic Club, the Trinity College East Athletics Club, NCA Basketball, the Silver Bullets Athletic Club, the D'Abadie Progressive Athletic Club, and the Spartans High Speed Performance Athletic Club are also based in Arima.

Most suburbs, communities and neighbourhoods around the Borough have their own sporting complexes and community swimming pools.

The three major sporting arenas in Arima are:

- The Larry Gomes Stadium
- Arima Velodrome
- Santa Rosa Race Track

== Attractions ==
- Asa Wright Nature Centre, located in Arima Valley, it has a nature walk and swimming at a natural stream pool.
- Santa Rosa Carib Centre, located on Paul Mitchell Road, off De Gannes Street in Arima, it contains items from Arima's native Carib history and is the headquarters of the Carib Queen. It also has displays about Carib descendants in Arima. Native items are also available for purchase.
- Cleaver Woods, it has nature walks and Amerindian exhibits.
- Princess Royal Park (Arima Savannah) is a wide, open, savannah surrounded by Lord Kitchener Blvd to the east, Robinson Street to the south, Queen Mary Avenue to the west and the Arima Velodrome to the north.

=== Utilities ===
Electric generation is handled by Powergen, while electrical distribution is handled by the Trinidad and Tobago Electricity Commission (T&TEC). Powergen has natural gas-fired generation plants at Point Lisas, Penal, and Wrightson Road in Port of Spain. Additional power can be supplied from power generation facilities controlled by Inncogen at Point Lisas.

Telecommunications are regulated by the Telecommunications Authority of Trinidad and Tobago (TATT). It has been working to break up the monopoly, granting several new licences in 2005 to new companies in the market. Fixed-line telephone service is a monopoly controlled by Telecommunications Services of Trinidad and Tobago (TSTT). Licences have been granted for competition in this area, but start-up is a while away. Wireless telephony is controlled by TSTT and bmobile, as well as Digicel, which came later. Licences have been granted for a private company, Laqtel, to offer wireless service in competition with TSTT and Digicel. However, Laqtel had its licence revoked, and is undergoing severe financial difficulties.

Digital cable television is provided by Flow. High-speed internet service of up to 100 Mbit/s and digital landline telephone service are all available in Arima.

Water and sewerage are under the purview of the Water and Sewerage Authority of Trinidad and Tobago (WASA).

== Education ==
There are 17 primary (private and public) and 4 secondary educational institutions in Arima, and some post-secondary level technical training institutes. St. Joseph's Convent in Arima was closed many years ago and the building now houses a retreat centre called Emmaus Centre.

== Gallery ==
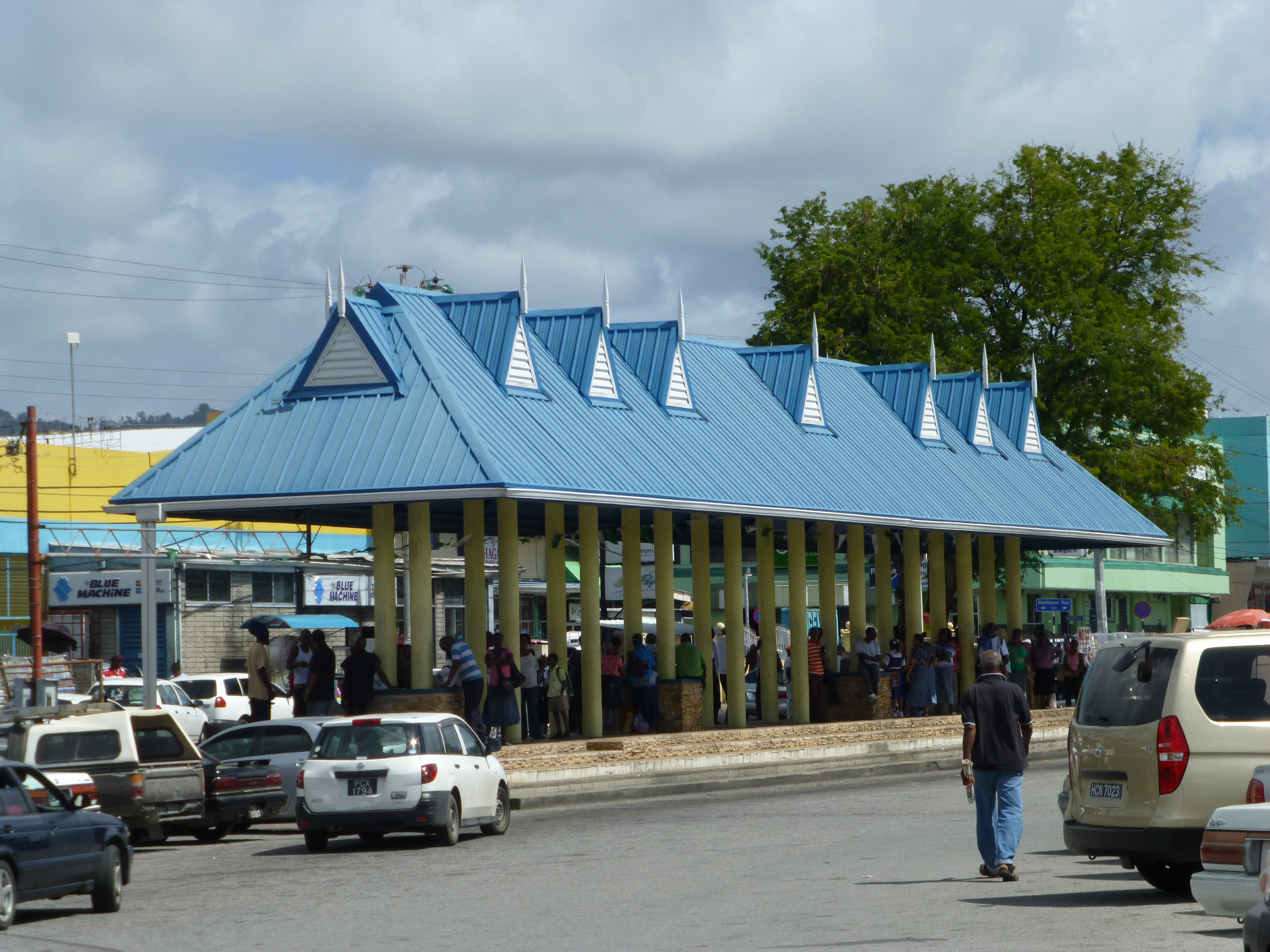
Bus terminal

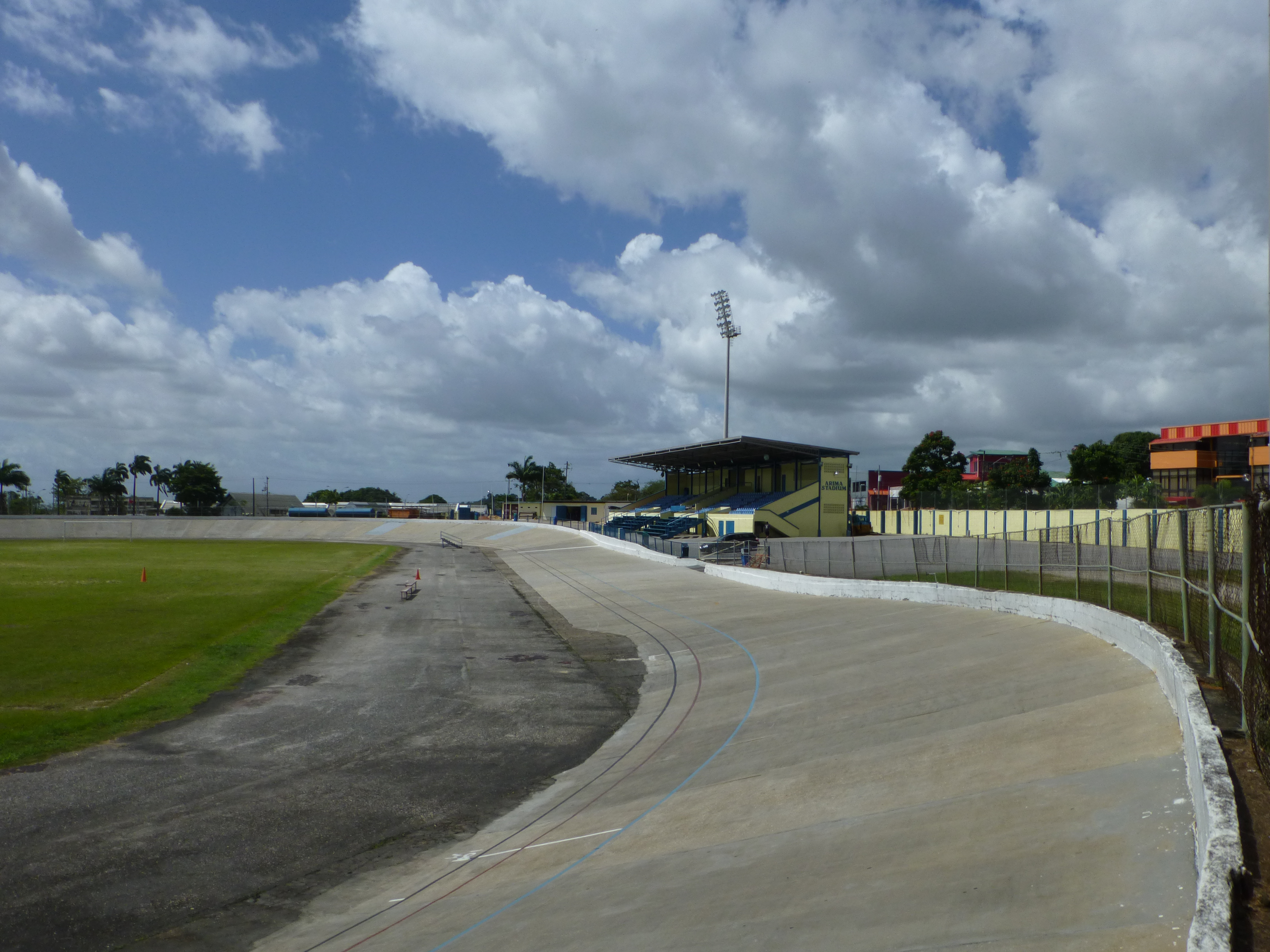
Arima Velodrome

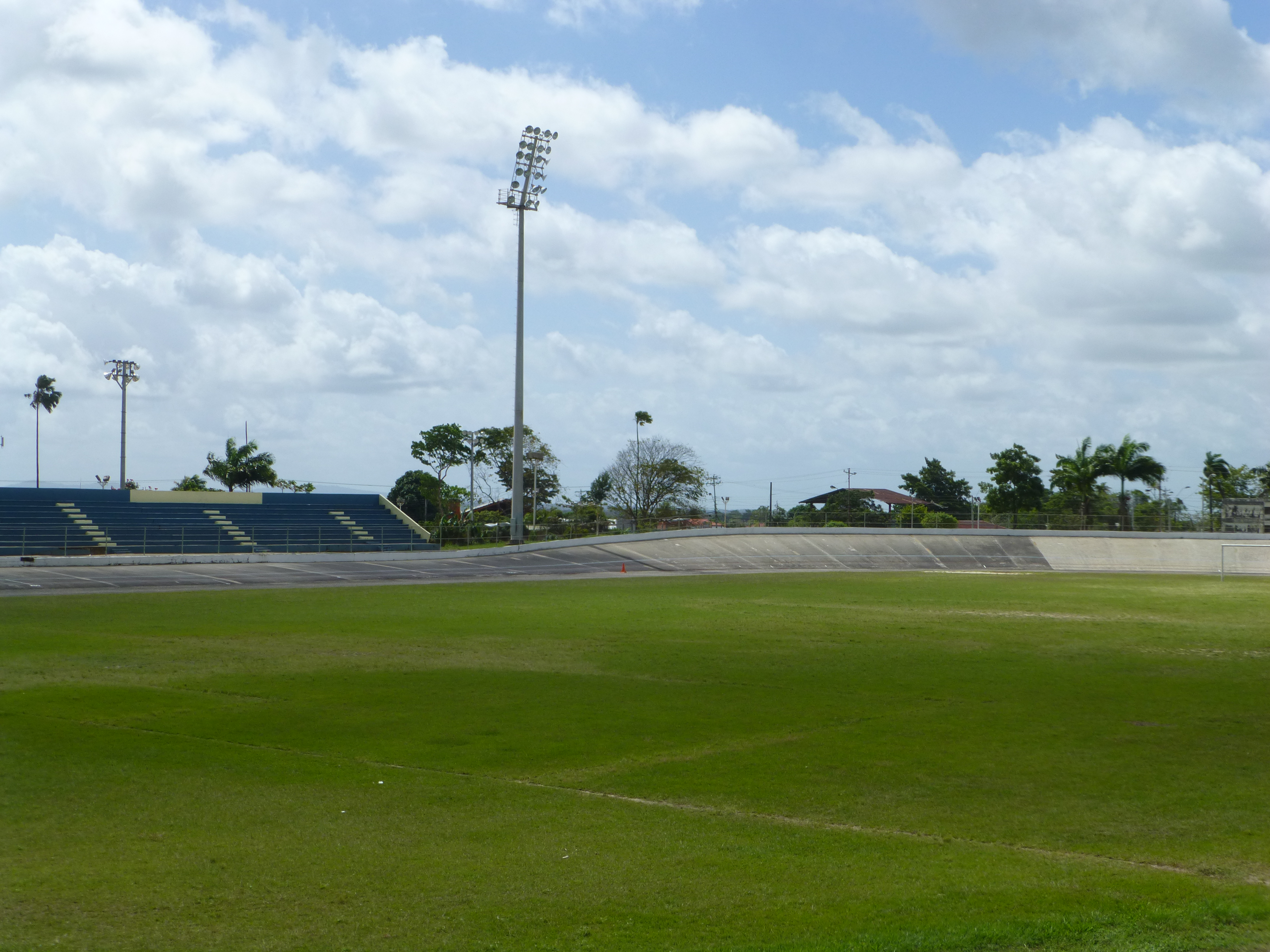
Arima Velodrome

== Notable people ==
- Ian Alvarez, aka Bunji Garlin - Soca artiste
- William Beebe (1877–1962), naturalist, died near Arima
- Larry Gomes - cricketer
- Neveal Hackshaw - football player
- Derek King - Footballer
- Deon Lendore, Sprinter
- Sunil Narine - cricketer
- Andre Rampersad - football player
- Aldwin Roberts, The Lord Kitchener - Calypso icon
- Phil Simmons - cricketer
- Jeremy Solozano- cricketer
