= Lange Park =

Town in Trinidad and Tobago, located on the borough of Chaguanas, island of Trinidad

Lange Park is the oldest planned premium residential community in Chaguanas, Trinidad and Tobago.

== History ==
The Lange Park community was founded in 1963 and is currently the oldest planned residential community in the Central of the island of Trinidad in the Republic of Trinidad and Tobago. The Lange Park community was previously owned entirely by one family, the Lange's, over time, lots of land were sold until it soon became entirely privately owned by various families. One can understand where the name "Lange Park" is taken from with this background information.

== Geography ==
The Lange Park estate covers approximately 300 acres with 1,100 homes and 3,300 residents. It also borders other prominent towns such as downtown Chaguanas in the West, Montrose in the East and South and Endeavour in the North.The Lange Park community is situated just off one of the main highways within the island, the Solomon Hochoy Highway and is bordered, to the north, by a large shopping and entertainment centre, Prize Plaza Mall, featuring a multiplex cinema and night spots. The development is also very near to one of the World's largest Divali sites, the Divali Nagar. The Lange Park community's location is central to the island and makes it 20 minutes from the airport, 30 minutes from the capital city of Port-of-Spain and 35 minutes from San Fernando.

== Climate ==
Lange Park as well as the most of Trinidad and Tobago has a seasonal tropical climate consisting of two seasons; a dry season from January to May and a wet season from June to December.

== Governance ==
The administration of Lange Park is done by the Chaguanas Borough Corporation as well as the Lange Park Residents Association (LAPRA) which comprises a committee of Lange Park residents within the community. The Chaguanas Borough Corporation is a Local Government Authority that provides governmental services to the Chaguanas area, Lange Park inclusive. These services which take place are maintenance of roadways, building inspections as well as management of recreational areas such as the Lange Park sports field. LAPRA would take heed of the communities problems as monthly meetings are held within the community and forward it to the Chaguanas Borough Corporation to be dealt with.

== Infrastructure ==
=== Health Care ===
The Chaguanas district health facility is the closest to the Lange Park community and is located on the Main Road and Galt Street, Chaguanas.

=== Recreational Area ===
In the center of Lange Park, one would find a recreational area which features a paved jogging track, an outdoor gym facility, a children's playground and a cricket field. This jogging track attracts many exercising and warming up prior to utilizing the parks outdoor gym facility. The outdoor gym facility is an excellent source for residents to get their daily workout at any time in this serene environment. A gated children's playground is also present with colorful swings, slides and climbing facilities. This spacious and tranquil park also presents a parking lot, a gazebo and a pavilion that would often hosts musical and community events.

=== Gated Communities ===
Within the Lange Park community, four communities are further gated; The Pointe, Legacy, Emerald and Montrose Place. The Pointe gated housing complex are town houses built by Lange Holdings Limited, whereas the Legacy housing complex, also built by Lange Holdings Limited are two story houses. Within the Legacy complex, there are two different housing choices, Spring and Autumn, the Spring houses being slightly bigger and the Autumn houses being slightly smaller. Within the Emerald complex, one purchases land within this development and has it architecturally designed to one's liking. Montrose Place is located on Eastern Avenue and is the last of the four gated-community areas to be built. There are thirty four units which are all two storey attached homes but built with a plush platform and the roof of the second floor for general relaxation, star gazing etc.

== Entertainment and Shopping ==
The Lange Park community is fairly close to two major shopping centers; Price Plaza Mall as well as Downtown Chaguanas. When out drinking in Lange Park there are many establishments was can visit such as Greasy Spoon, Mojo's, Lowa 5, First & Last Bar & Roti Shop, Esters Bar, Double R Bar and Roti Shop Toby's Bar . The Price Plaza Mall is anchored by a Pricesmart membership Shopping Club as well as other major internationally known restaurants and retailers such as Pizza Hut, TGIF, Ruby Tuesday's, KFC, Catwalk and Hallmark. For fast shopping for the house you can visit Harry's the chicken man, and the market in Endeavor for your fast fresh groceries without coming out of your car. Downtown Chaguanas features a wide array of products ranging from food products to textiles. Many locals rise early on weekends and make their way to the Chaguanas produce market, located on the Chaguanas Main Road, for the freshest meats, fruits and vegetables.

On the Chaguanas Main Road, other bargains can be purchased such as textiles, clothing and household products. It should be noted within the Christmas season, the Chaguanas Main Road is filled with thousands of shoppers and one cannot drive on this road due to the many shoppers.

== Education ==
Lange park serves seven schools. Three are government while the other four are privately owned. The Chaguanas South Secondary School (formerly Chaguanas Junior Secondary School), Chaguanas North Secondary School (formerly the Chaguanas Senior Comprehensive School), and the Montrose Government Primary School are all government schools. On the other hand, Vinnies Kindergarten Montessori School, Explorers Childcare Academy, the Eniath's Kindergarten school and Montrose Pre School are four privately owned schools. The Montrose Government Primary School is located on La Clave Street, Lange Park, Chaguanas while the Explorers Childcare Academy is located on Firtree Crescent, Lange Park, Chaguanas and serves children of the ages 2 months to four years full-time and five years to twelve years part-time.
