= California, Trinidad and Tobago =

California
- Neighbourhood
- Interactive map of California
- Coordinates: 10°24′N 61°28′W
- Country: Trinidad and Tobago
- Region: Couva–Tabaquite–Talparo
- Town: Couva
- Time zone: UTC-4 (AST)
- Postal Code: 54xxxx

California is a neighbourhood located south of Downtown Couva, within the Couva–Tabaquite–Talparo regional corporation, Trinidad and Tobago. It is bordered on the west by the Point Lisas Industrial Estate and to the East by the University of Trinidad and Tobago (Point Lisas Campus). Dow Village and Esperanza Village are within California.

Its football team are Central F.C.
