= Hillsborough Reservoir =

- Location within Trinidad and Tobago Location within the Caribbean
- Location: Tobago
- Coordinates: 11°13′40″N 60°40′00″W
- Type: reservoir
- Basin countries: Trinidad and Tobago
- Water volume: 1 million cubic metres (810 acre⋅ft)
- Surface elevation: 36.5 m (120 ft)

The Hillsborough Reservoir is the major source of drinking water for the island of Tobago. Located 36.5 metres (100 ft) above sea level, the reservoir is managed by Water and Sewerage Authority of Trinidad and Tobago. It has a capacity of about 1 million m^{3} (225 million gallons).

Construction began in 1944 and the facility was commissioned in 1952 by Governor Sir Hubert Rance.

== See also ==
- List of reservoirs and dams in Trinidad and Tobago
