= Nirmal Nanan =

Trinidadian cricketer (1951–2021)

Personal information
- Born: 19 August 1951; Preysal, Trinidad, British West Indies
- Died: 4 December 2021 (aged 70)
- Batting: Right-handed
- Bowling: Right-arm legbreak, googly

Domestic team information
- Years: Team
- 1972–1980: Nottinghamshire

Career statistics
Competition	First-class	List A
Matches	35	32
Runs scored	925	472
Batting average	15.67	16.85
100s/50s	0/3	0/2
Top score	72	93
Balls bowled	486	573
Wickets	9	16
Bowling average	35.77	26.56
5 wickets in innings	0	0
10 wickets in match	0	0
Best bowling	3/12	4/24
Catches/stumpings	22/—	8/—
- Source: , 17 September 2019

Nirmal Nanan (19 August 1951 – 4 December 2021) was a Trinidadian first-class cricketer active from 1969 to 80 who played for Nottinghamshire and in Trinidad. Nanan was born in Preysal, Trinidad. Nanan's nephew Rangy Nanan played Test cricket for West Indies.

He died on 4 December 2021, at the age of 70.
