= List of regions of Trinidad and Tobago by Human Development Index =

Below is a list of the Regions of Trinidad and Tobago ranked by their Human Development Index as of 2023.

Rank	Region	HDI (2023)
Very high human development
1	Central (Chaguanas, Couva-Tabaquite-Talbaro)	0.819
2	North West (Arima, Diego Mártin, Port of Spain, San Juan-Laventille, Tunanpuna-Piarco)	0.809
–	Trinidad and Tobago	0.807
3	South West (Penal-Debe, Point Fortin, Princes Town, San Fernando, Siparia)	0.803
4	Tobago	0.805
High human development
5	East (Sangre-Grande, Mayaro-Río Claro)	0.787
