= Trinidad and Tobago Electricity Commission =

- Type: State-owned enterprise
- Industry: Electric utilities
- Founded: 1946
- Headquarters: Port of Spain, Trinidad, Trinidad and Tobago
- Area served: Republic of Trinidad and Tobago
- Key people: Ian Ramrattan (General Manager, since December 1, 2025)
- Products: Electricity transmission and distribution
- Website: www.ttec.co.tt

Trinidad and Tobago Electricity Commission (T&TEC) is the sole retailer of electricity in Trinidad and Tobago. It is responsible for the design, construction, operation and maintenance of the country's electrical transmission and distribution network. The utility supplies electric power to customers on both islands via a single interconnected grid. Electrical energy is widely purchased, metered and fed into the national grid from independent power producers. These producers are the Power Generation Company of Trinidad and Tobago (PowerGen) giving a total of 1,344 MW, Trinidad Generation Unlimited (TGU) giving 720MW and Trinity Power Ltd. giving 225 MW. All power stations in Trinidad and Tobago are fueled by hydrocarbons.

T&TEC was formed in 1946 after the merger of independent companies. It supplies over a million residential, municipal, commercial and industrial customers.

The current General Manager is Ian Ramrattan, who assumed duties on 1st December 2025.

== Electrical Power suppliers ==
PowerGen is the largest power generator in Trinidad and Tobago. In 2006, the United States-based Mirant Corporation, facing a severe financial situation, announced that part of Mirant's restructuring efforts includes the intent to sell off their part ownership of PowerGen. Following that announcement, the government of Trinidad and Tobago placed the overall structure of T&TEC and PowerGen under review for future possible amalgamation. At that time the companies T&TEC, Mirant and BP currently owned 51%, 39% and 10% of the PowerGen company respectively. Any possible termination of the Mirant (now Genon) stake was seen as an opportunity to simplify the structure and relationship between the T&TEC and PowerGen companies. Since then Mirant sold its position and the new minority shareholders are MaruEnergy Trinidad L.L.C. (owned by the Japanese multinational - Marubeni) which has a 39% shareholding and parastatal NEL Power Holdings Limited which has a 10% ownership. Powergen operates three major power generation plants which are located at Point Lisas, Port of Spain and Penal. The largest generation plant is located at Point Lisas.

The generation plants individual capacities are:

Point Lisas : 838 Mega Watts Port-of-Spain : 270 Mega Watts Penal : 236 Mega Watts

Trinidad Generation Unlimited (TGU) is an independently operated parastatal managing a single power plant but is the second largest producer in Trinidad and Tobago. The 720-megawatt (MW) TGU facility is the largest combined-cycle power generation plant in the Caribbean and currently supplies approximately 50% of Trinidad & Tobago's electrical energy. TGU is owned by the National Investment Fund Holding Company Limited (NIF), a parastatal company established by its only shareholder, the Republic of Trinidad and Tobago and is located at the Union Industrial Estate, La Brea, Trinidad and Tobago.

Trinity Power Ltd. at Couva in the Point Lisas Industrial Estate is Trinidad's only totally privately owned wholesale power generator and has a capacity of 225 MW. An article in the May 2006 issue of Power Engineering magazine it was announced that G.E would be operating and maintaining the Trinity power plant. The Trinidad Ministry of Energy and Energy Industries website stated as of November 2020. "Trinity Power Limited (TPL) is owned by US based Carib Power Management LLC, which is a small private independent power an infrastructure company with expertise in the development, acquisition and long term operation of power generation, natural gas exploration, and transportation and infrastructure projects." In December 2020 it was announced that Trinity Power Ltd. is being acquired by ContourGlobal a British International Investment company.

Cove Power Station owned by T&TEC and on the smaller island of Tobago was put into operation in October 2009. This 64 MW Wärtsilä natural gas or diesel power plant will reduce transmission losses on electric power transmission underground marine cables between the islands, in addition to upgrading bulk power to Tobago previously provided by T&TEC's old 21 MW Scarborough Power Station which only used diesel fuel. Scarborough is still available for standby use at a capacity of 11 MW.

== See also ==
- Water and Sewerage Authority
