= National Gas Company of Trinidad and Tobago =

State-owned natural gas company

- Type: Public
- Industry: Natural Gas
- Founded: 1975; 51 years ago
- Headquarters: Orinoco Drive, Point Lisas Industrial Estate, Couva, Trinidad and Tobago
- Products: Natural Gas
- Website: www.ngc.co.tt

The National Gas Company of Trinidad and Tobago Limited (NGC) is a state-owned natural gas company. It was created by the Government of Trinidad and Tobago in 1975. NGC operates in the field of gas pipelines, industrial sites, gas production, port and marine infrastructure, natural gas liquids and liquefied natural gas, the latter through its co-owned subsidiary Atlantic LNG. It has assets worth $43 billion. Its credit rating by Moody's is Baa2 and A− from S&P. The company currently operates in Point Lisas, Couva at the Point Lisas Industrial Estate.
