= Dow Village, Couva–Tabaquite–Talparo =

Dow Village
- Village
- Interactive map of Dow Village
- Coordinates: 10°24′N 61°28′W
- Country: Trinidad and Tobago
- Region: Couva–Tabaquite–Talparo
- Town: Couva
- Time zone: UTC-4 (AST)

Dow Village is a village located within the borders of California, Couva in the region of Couva–Tabaquite–Talparo in Trinidad and Tobago. It is famous for its annual play based on the Ramayana called Ramleela. This live play chronicles the activity of Lord Rama (an incarnation of the Hindu God Vishnu) as he rescues his wife, Sita, from the clutches of Ravana. Dow Village is also known for the lighting of clay pots called deyas on Divali day. The diyas are lit along the street in bamboo arches. There is also a very old masjid and several churches, in addition to a mandir. It borders Esperanza Village.

The village is sandwiched between the heavily industrialized Point Lisas Industrial estate and the now defunct Caroni (1975) Limited Brechin Castle Sugar Factory. The sugar factory was the source of the employment of many of the original inhabitants.
