= Dow Village =

Dow Village may refer to:

- Dow Village, Couva, Trinidad and Tobago
- Dow Village, South Oropouche, Trinidad and Tobago

== See also ==
- Dow (disambiguation)
