= Carli Bay =

Bay in Couva, Trinidad and Tobago

- Interactive map of Carli Bay
- Location: Couva, Trinidad and Tobago
- Nearest city: Couva
- Coordinates: 10.424357°N 61.494449°W
- Operator: Couva–Tabaquite–Talparo
- Status: Open all year
- Designation: Public beach

Carli Bay is a bay located near the urban town Couva in Central Trinidad.

The bay contains a 3.0 km² mangrove forest near the mouth of the Couva River, which is expanding seaward on sediment from the river.
