= Rangy Nanan =

Trinidadian cricketer

Personal information
- Born: 29 May 1953; Preysal, Couva, Trinidad and Tobago
- Died: 23 March 2016 (aged 62); Couva, Trinidad and Tobago
- Batting: Right-handed
- Bowling: Right-arm off break

International information
- National side: West Indies
- Only Test (cap 174): 8 December 1980 v Pakistan

Domestic team information
- Years: Team
- 1972/73–1990/91: Trinidad and Tobago

Career statistics
Competition	Test	FC	LA
Matches	1	94	35
Runs scored	16	2,607	201
Batting average	8.00	20.85	9.57
100s/50s	0/0	1/9	0/0
Top score	8	125	39
Balls bowled	216	0	1,755
Wickets	4	366	45
Bowling average	22.75	23.10	21.06
5 wickets in innings	0	20	0
10 wickets in match	0	1	0
Best bowling	2/37	7/109	4/36
Catches/stumpings	2/0	61/0	12/0
- Source: CricInfo, 18 April 2019

Rangy Nanan (Note: While Wisden Cricketers' Almanack gives "Rangy" as his first name, the West Indies Cricket Annual 1982 gives his first name as "Ranjie".) (29 May 1953 – 23 March 2016) was a Trinidadian cricketer who played as a right arm off spinner for West Indian cricket team. Nanan played for both Trinidad and Tobago and for the West Indies cricket team. He captained T&T for several years, steering the side to a 1985 Red Stripe Cup title. Nanan picked up a sum of 366 wickets in 94 first class games for T&T.

== Early life ==
Born in Preysal Village, Couva, Trinidad and Tobago, Nanan attended Presentation College in Chaguanas, where he took cricket seriously for the first time. After developing as an off-spinner, Nanan made the Trinidad and Tobago youth representative teams in 1969 and 1970, and toured England with the West Indies youth team in 1970. His continual success in youth cricket, including winning the Learie Constantine Trophy for being the most outstanding all rounder at the 1972 West Indies Youth Championships, led to Nanan making his first-class cricket debut for Trinidad and Tobago in 1972/73.

== Senior cricket career ==
Playing for Trinidad and Tobago for almost two decades, Nanan was the most successful bowler in West Indies domestic cricket history, taking 366 first-class wickets at 23. Included in the West Indies squad for the 1980 tour of Pakistan, Nanan played his only Test match, against Pakistan at Iqbal Stadium, Faisalabad in December 1980, taking four wickets.

In the 1982 domestic Shell Shield season, Nanan took 32 wickets in five matches, breaking the previous record of 27 wickets by Inshan Ali in 1975, and was named one of the five "Cricketers of the Year" by the West Indies Cricket Annual. He notched his solitary first class hundred, 125 which came in 1983 against the Leeward Islands which comprised a bowling attack with pacers Andy Roberts and Eldine Baptiste.

Nanan captained Trinidad and Tobago, including in the 1984 match against the touring Australian cricket team, when Australian captain Kim Hughes, angered by Nanan's refusal to set what Hughes considered a reasonable target to chase, made only two scoring shots in 75 minutes.

Nanan also played as a professional in the United Kingdom, including for Durham County Cricket Club in the Minor Counties Championship in 1983 and Scottish team Kirkcaldy Cricket Club, where in the 1990 season he scored 615 runs at 32.37 and took 81 wickets at 13.49.

== Post-cricketing retirement ==
In addition to his role as a professional cricketer, Nanan was a policeman and later served as the liaison officer for the West Indies team.

Nanan suffered a stroke in 2012 from which he never recovered, and died of a heart attack at the Couva Hospital in Caroni on 23 March 2016, survived by his wife Martha and two sons. Brian Lara paid tribute to Nanan, saying he learnt a lot about the art of playing spin from Nanan, while former West Indies fast bowler Tony Gray said Nanan was a consummate professional who was difficult to score off and was in love with cricket and West Indies cricket.

Nanan's uncle Nirmal Nanan and nephew Magnum Nanan also played first-class cricket.

During April 2021 The Preysal Recreation Ground that's located in Preysal, Couva was renamed in Nanan's honour.
