= Navet Dam =

Coordinates: 10°24′04″N 61°15′09″W

The Navet Dam is one of the major reservoirs supplying potable water in Trinidad and Tobago. It is located in Tabaquite, Trinidad and Tobago and is managed by the Water and Sewerage Authority of Trinidad and Tobago. The dam was completed in 1962, expanded in 1966 and 1976. It supplies Rio Claro, Tableland, Biche, Princes Town, Williams Ville, Borde Narve.

The Navet Dam covers an area of 3.24 km^{2} (800 acres) and has a capacity of 18,200,000 cubic metres (4 Billion imperial gallons). It supplies 86.4 m^{3} per day.

== See also ==
- List of reservoirs and dams in Trinidad and Tobago
