= Water and Sewerage Authority =

Government corporation in Trinidad and Tobago

Water and Sewage Authority of Trinidad and Tobago
- Company type: Government-owned and controlled corporation
- Industry: Water distribution Wastewater Services
- Founded: September 1965
- Headquarters: 1c Farm Rd, St Joseph, Trinidad and Tobago
- Area served: The Republic of Trinidad and Tobago
- Key people: Roshan Babwah (Chairman) Dain Maharaj (CEO) Acting
- Website: https://www.wasa.gov.tt/

The Water and Sewerage Authority of Trinidad and Tobago (WASA) is the sole water and sewerage provider in Trinidad and Tobago. It was formed in September 1965 by an Act of Parliament to manage the Hollis, Caroni–Arena and Navet dams in Trinidad. In Tobago, WASA maintains the Hillsborough Reservoir along with other freshwater wells to provide municipal drinking water for the country. The purview of the authority extends to the country's sewage treatment plants. The current Chief Executive Officer is Dain Maharaj (acting). The current chairman is Roshan Babwah with the other members being Tawari Tota-Maharaj, Chaitram Brown, Kern D. Saney, Naveen Maraj, Indra Mohammed and Patricia Herry. The former Acting Chief Executive Officer Jeevan Joseph, according to Prime Minister Kamla Persad-Bissessar tendered his resignation for personal reasons.

== History ==
The Water and Sewerage Authority was formed by Act 16 of 1965 and enacted on September 1, 1965. This Act brought together several agencies that were formerly charged with the responsibility of providing water and sewerage facilities to the nation:

- The Central Water Distribution Authority
- The Port of Spain City Council
- The San Fernando Borough Council
- The Arima Borough Council
- The County Councils
- The Water Division of the Ministry of Public Utilities
- The Sanitation Division of the Ministry of Public Utilities

== Infrastructure ==
The authority is the largest public utility in the country. It serves over 92% of the population with pipeborne water through private house connections and standpipes. Since its establishment, water production has increased from 223,000 cubic metres to 650,000 cubic metres in 1990.

With respect to wastewater, 30%–40% of the population is served by a central sewerage collection and treatment system. Another 40% of the population are served by cesspit-tank soil-absorption field systems. Those remaining are served by pit latrines (outhouses).

== Sport ==
The authority is represented by WASA FC, currently playing in the National Super League, the second tier of the Trinidadian and Tobagonian football league structure.

== See also ==
- Trinidad and Tobago Electricity Commission
