= St. Mary's, Trinidad and Tobago =

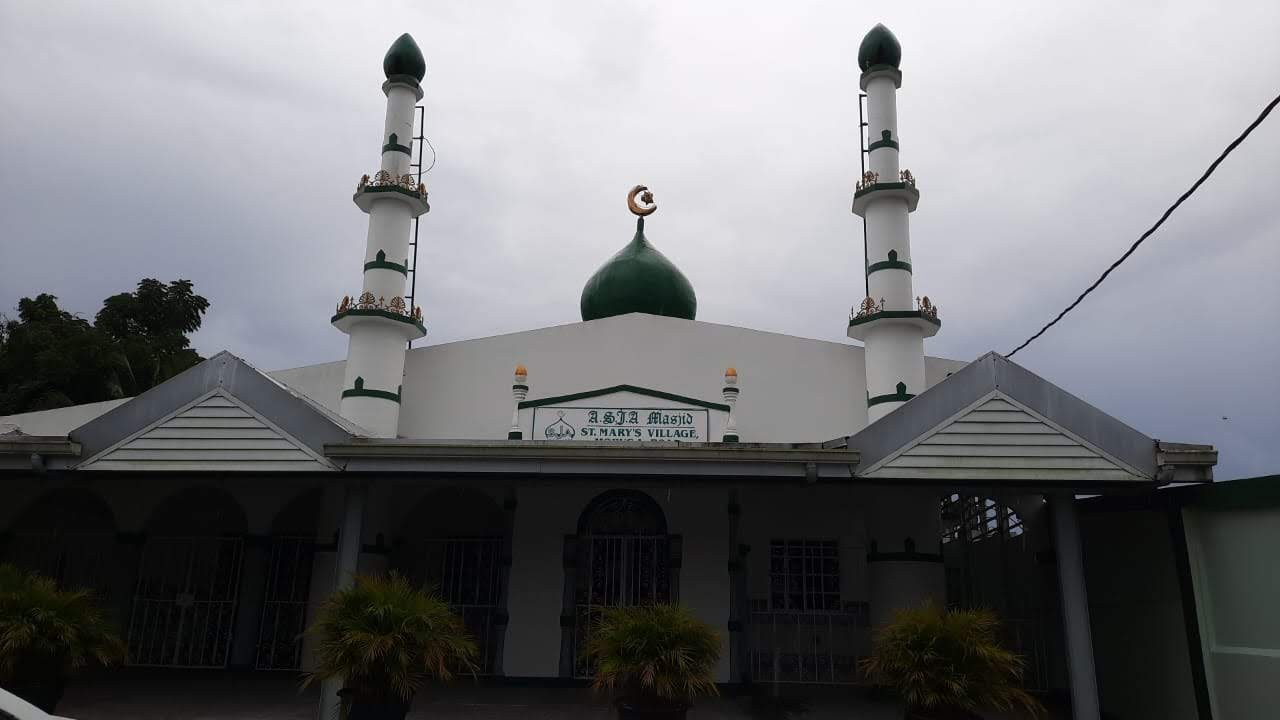
Masjid in St. Mary's Village

St. Mary's is a community in the Republic of Trinidad and Tobago. It is located in west-central Trinidad, and is administered by the Couva–Tabaquite–Talparo Regional Corporation.
