= Hollis Reservoir =

Reservoir in Trinidad and Tobago

- Location within Trinidad and Tobago
- Location: Trinidad
- Coordinates: 10°42′N 61°11′W
- Type: reservoir
- Basin countries: Trinidad and Tobago

Hollis Reservoir is a reservoir located in north Trinidad and it supplies Arima, Valencia. It is also the oldest one in the country opened in 1936. It is also a popular tourist attraction. Located about three miles off the Valencia Road the Hollis Dam is the oldest dam Trinidad and Tobago. It was built between 1934 and 1936, under the reign of Sir Claud Hollis, who governed Trinidad and Tobago from 1930 to 1936. This man-made lake is fed from the waters of the Quare River and rainfall from the surrounding mountains. When full it can supply 8.2 million gallons of water to people in Arima, Nettoville, Cleaver Road, Bregan Park, D'Abadie and Arouca. With the dry season, the supply is cut in half. The Hollis catchment also supports a variety of animal life such as lappe, tattoo, howler monkeys, deer, wild hogs, Caiman, talapia and snakes. Hunting nor fishing is permitted near the dam. Visitors are allowed to picnic, however courtesy of the Water and Sewerage Authority of Trinidad and Tobago. Foreign visitors and locals regularly hike from the dam into the surrounding mountains to experience the spectacular wildlife that the dam, and its surrounding area, have to offer. There are 90 species of birds that call Hollis their home, some permanent, and some migrating for the winter. Visitors and personnel are not permitted to swim at the dam.

== See also ==
- List of reservoirs and dams in Trinidad and Tobago
