= Atlantic LNG =

Company in Trinidad and Tobago

Coordinates: 10°11′2″N 61°41′37″W

Atlantic LNG 4 Holdings Limited
- Industry: Natural gas
- Founded: July 1995; 30 years ago
- Headquarters: Port of Spain, Trinidad & Tobago
- Key people: CEO Jean Andre Celestain
- Website: atlanticlng.com

The Atlantic LNG Company of Trinidad and Tobago is a liquefied natural gas (LNG) producing company operating a liquefied natural gas plant in Point Fortin, Trinidad and Tobago. Atlantic LNG operates four liquefaction units (trains). Train 4, with a 5.2 million tonnes per year production capacity, is among the world's largest LNG trains in operation.

== History ==
The Atlantic LNG project was started by Cabot LNG (now Suez) in 1992 part of Cabot Corporation. In 1993, Cabot LNG, National Gas Company of Trinidad and Tobago, Amoco and British Gas plc signed the Memorandum of Understanding, and launched a feasibility study of the project. The Atlantic LNG company was formed in July 1995. General Construction of the first train started in 1996, and the train was officially opened on 13 March 1999. The first cargo was loaded in April 1999. Train 2 started up on 12 August 2002, Train 3 on 28 April 2003, and Train 4 in December 2005. A feasibility study for the fifth train—Train X—was scheduled to be concluded by December 2007. As of March 2025 the fifth train has yet to be completed and is believed to be canceled.

In 2021, BP Trinidad and Tobago informed the government of Trinidad and Tobago that due to gas production decline, there was insufficient gas to supply Train 1. The government decided despite spending US$250 million on renovating the train to suspend operations for at least two years.

In 2023 shareholders agreed to restructure ownership to expand the role the National Gas Company of Trinidad and Tobago by removing the Chinese Investment Corporation shares from train 1. In March 2025 BP confirmed that Train 1 will be permanently decommissioned and decoupled from the rest of the facility.

== Technical features ==
The total production capacity of Atlantic LNG's four trains is around 14.8 million tonnes per year. The capacity of the Train 1 is 3 million tonnes per year, and the capacity of each of Trains 2 and 3 is 3.3 million tonnes per year. Train 4, which cost $1.2 billion, has a production capacity of 5.2 million tonnes per year. The total storage capacity of Atlantic LNG's facility is 524,000 cubic meters. The total investment of building four LNG trains was US$3.6 billion.

The Train 1 is supplied from the BP-operated fields in the east coast of Trinidad through the NGC-Trinidad-and-Tobago-owned 36 inches (910 mm) diameter pipeline.

Train 2 is supplied from BP land (50%) off the east coast of Trinidad and from British Gas-operated land (50%) off the north coast (NCMA) through 24 inches (610 mm) diameter pipeline. Train 3 receives 75% of its supply from BP land and 25% from a mix of NCMA gas (as with Train 2) and east coast gas (ECMA) held 50% by BG and 50% by ChevronTexaco.

== Shareholders ==
Atlantic LNG is owned by the National Gas Company of Trinidad and Tobago (NGC Trinidad and Tobago), Shell, BP, and formerly the Chinese Investment Corporation (CIC). In 2023 the National Gas Company of Trinidad and Tobago took ownership over the CIC shares.

The stakes in Train 1 are:

- Shell (51%)
- BP (39%)
- National Gas Company of Trinidad and Tobago (10%)

The stakes in Trains 2 and 3 are:

- Shell (57.5%)
- BP (42.5%)

The stakes in Train 4 are:

- Shell (51.11%)
- BP (37.78%)
- National Gas Company of Trinidad and Tobago (11.11%)
