= Erphaan Alves =

Trinidadian soca recording artist and songwriter (born 1991)

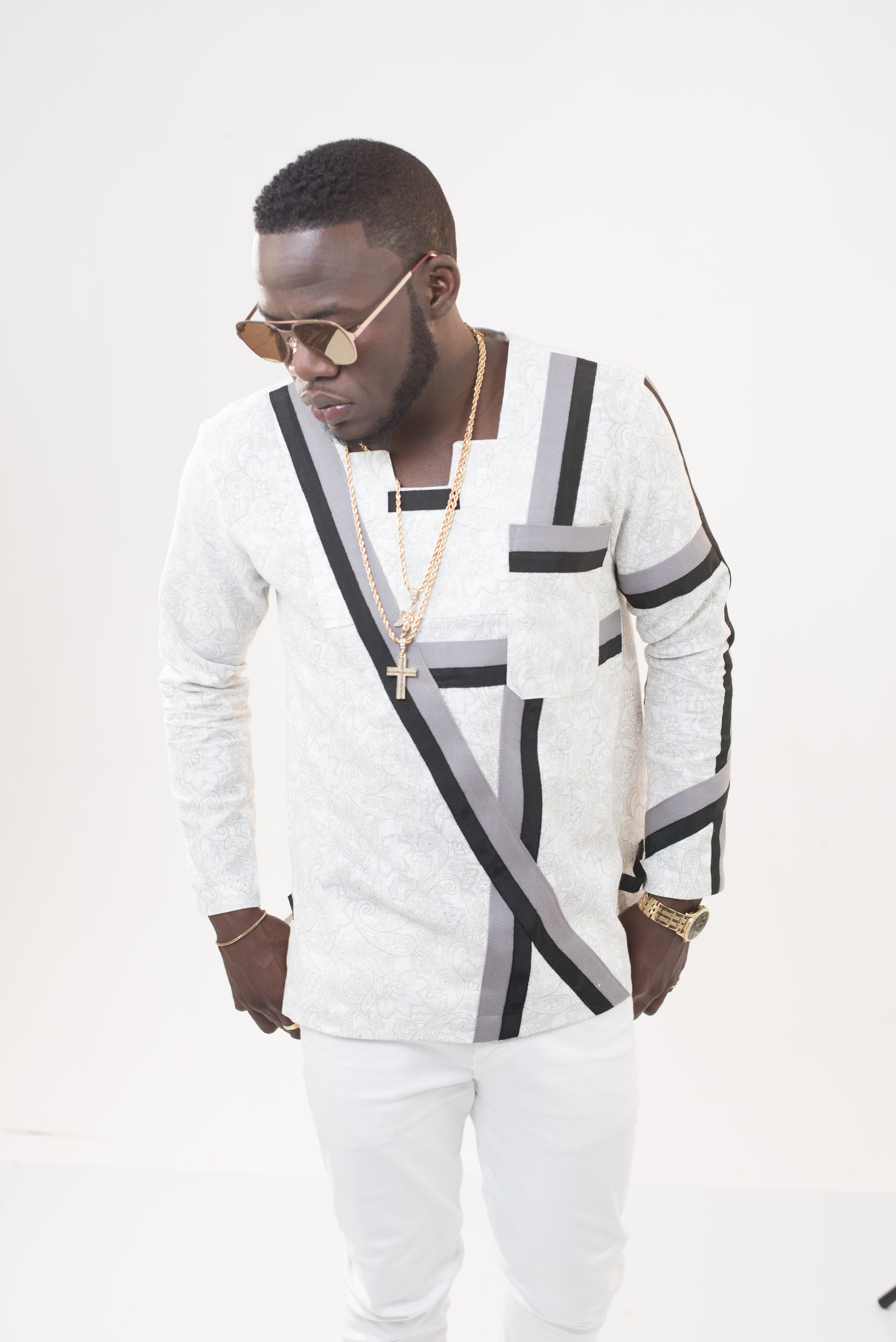
- Alves in 2017

Background information
- Also known as: EA
- Born: 23 November 1991 (age 34)
- Origin: Chaguanas, Trinidad and Tobago; University of the West Indies, St Augustine
- Genres: soca
- Occupations: Musician, songwriter
- Instruments: Vocals, piano
- Years active: 2012–present

Erphaan Alves (born 23 November 1991) is a Trinidadian soca recording artist and songwriter. He initially gained full recognition in the soca world 2012 when he qualified as a finalist in both Groovy and International Power Soca Monarch Finals with the songs "In your Eyes" and "Terrible". His transition to soca megastar proved complete when he cued the HD band into his 2018 monster hit ‘Overdue’.

Erphaan was awarded Best New Male Soca Artist in the International Soca Awards 2012 and he was also an MTV IGGY Artiste of The Week that year. Erphaan acts as a songwriter alongside his soca career, writing songs such as "Precision Wine" sung by Kes the band, and "Make You Rock", "Take You Home" and "Doh Friad" sung by Machel Montano.

== Early life and career ==
Erphaan Alves was born on 23 November 1991, in Chaguanas, Trinidad and Tobago, where he grew up with his parents and brother. He attended Rosary Boy's RC Primary School in Port of Spain, then went on to St. George's College, Barataria where he participated in several competitions, and was the lead male vocalist of the school's parang group. He later moved on to complete a Bachelor of Arts in Musical Arts from the University of the West Indies, St Augustine Campus in 2013. Erphaan began singing at the age of nine and gained recognition when he entered Rosary Boys RC School Calypso Competition Calypso World in 2001 and won with his upbeat rendition, "Carnival Time". He moved on to make his name in both the Junior Calypso and Junior Soca Monarch Competitions, winning consecutively in the latter, in 2008 and 2009 with his own compositions titled "Soca Moving" and "Musical Journey".

Soca originated in Trinidad and Tobago and was created by Trinidadian Garfield Blackman, who felt calypso was fading away. Soca derived from calypso fused with Indian music. Soca has grown into a massive industry taking over the Carnival Scene and Carnival Road March Arena. Soca artist records, releases and perform continuously during carnival season to ensure a chance of winning Carnival Road March song and the Soca Monach. Erphaan managed to consistently make waves being a finalist in the International Soca Monarch 2014 and 2015. His song, "On D Spot" was once featured on an MTV Real World Episode in 2012. The musician offered his hit single 'Overdue' and an energetic collaboration with the soca queen Destra Garcia called 'Waistline Pelting' to 2018 carnival.

== Community engagement ==
Erphaan's success can be owned by the strong support system he had from family, friends, and St George's College, the secondary school he attended. In an effort to give back to his secondary school community, he created Alves' St George College music fund through which he donates musical equipment. This music fund falls under the umbrella 'tEAm' a larger organization formed by Alves and friends to do more in his community. "Together Each Achieves More, it is actually an acronym, me showing that I care about them just as much as they cared about me at the start of my career. I have a platform now to shed light on everybody and in turn as we grow together they shed light on me," Alves explains tEAm.

Erphaan is very active on social media with Twitter, Facebook and Instagram profiles. He believes that social media opens up avenue for artists and its important for him as an artist to take the time out to understand the marketing strategies behind social media.

== #noSeasons ==
The

1. noSeasons project was founded by Erphaan in 2016. It is geared towards promoting, inspiring and encouraging more soca release in Trinidad and Tobago after carnival. The objective, according to EA, is remove the ‘Soca is carnival music’ stigma, while fostering a new culture where, soca thrive all year round.

Since 2016 EA has been releasing new music as a part of the

1. noSeason project. In 2016 he released "Never Find", “Believe”, and “Island Crashers Medley”. In 2017 he released “Morning Come”, “Grip Me”, and “Knock knee” ft Salty. 2018 he released “No Habla”.

In May 2019 at the Vas Lounge, Woodbrook, Trinidad, EA premiered the music video for his latest single under the

1. noSeasons project, ‘Lock On’. "Rather than playing the same soca tunes year round, we should see new soca singles dropping every month, that is why I chose the theme of 'No Seasons' to describe the event. No other genre has any season, and neither should soca music." EA addressed fans and supporters at the premiere.

== Background ==
=== Musical style ===
Erphaan reflects a diverse musical style, bringing a fresh pop-type sound to soca. He is known to incorporate story-lines and notable moments into his music.

== Discography ==
=== Music videos ===
List of music videos showing year released and directors
Title	Year	Director (s)	Ref
"Blaze In Love"	2019	Ian Davis	
"Brave" (Erphaan Alves, Nailah Blackman & Sekon Sta)	2019	Steven M. Taylor	
"Compromise"	2019	Ahmad Muhammad & Adverb media	
"Overdue"	2018	Adverb media	
"Waistline Peltin" (Erphaan Alves & Destra)	2018	Sirlan Davis	
"Morning Come"	2017		
"Do it for them"	2017		
"Believe (Oh Yea)"	2016	King Studios	
"Island Crashers" (Erphaan Alves, Preedy & Sekon Sta)	2016	King Studios	
"Tanty"	2015		
"Highest Feeling"	2014		
"Eruption"	2013		
"In Your Eyez"	2012	Jeston Lett	

=== Singles ===
List of top songs showing year released and album
Title	Released	Album	Ref
"Overdue"	2017	Non- album singles	
"No Habla"	2018	Non- album singles	
"Intentions (Wine & Touch)"	2016	Get Soca 2016	
"Blaze in love"	2018	Non- album singles	
"Brave" (Erphaan Alves, Nailah Blackman & Sekon Sta)	2019	Non- album singles	
"Compromise"	2018	Non- album singles	
"Waistline Peltin" (Erphaan Alves & Destra)	2017	Non- album singles	
"Come From?"	2014	Jam Band Riddim EP	
"In Your Eyes"	2012	We Muzik Trinidad & Tobago Vol 1	
"Terrible" (Erphaan Alves & Machel Mantano)	2012	We Muzik Trinidad & Tobago Vol 1	
"On d Spot"	2012	We Muzik Trinidad & Tobago Vol 1	

== Filmography ==
List of films showing year released and directors
Film	Year	Director	Character	Description
Lock On	2019	Steven M. Taylor	Fake Police Officer	Erphaan stars in the film as a fake police officer, who is the leader of an ongoing illegal operation.
