= Camden Airstrip =

Camden Base
- IATA: none; ICAO: none

Summary
- Serves: Couva
- Location: Couva, Trinidad and Tobago
- Time zone: AST (UTC-4:00)
- Coordinates: 10.426361°N 61.445672°W
- Interactive map of Camden Base

Runways
| Direction | Length | | Surface |
| Direction | m | ft | Surface |
|---|---|---|---|
| 10/28 | 914.4 | 3,000 | Asphalt |

Camden Base is a small airstrip in Couva, Trinidad. Crop dusting aircraft use this airstrip; drag racing also takes place on the airstrip. The Camden (Field) Auxiliary Air Base was established in 1942 as an emergency airstrip. It included one paved 3,000 ft (910 m) x 75 ft (46 m) runway with extensive taxiways and dispersed camouflaged parking bays for USAAC, USN and RN. It was defended by US Army infantry and AAA units.

On May 24, 2011, Prime Minister Kamla Persad-Bissessar, at the one-year anniversary celebratory rally marking the election of her coalition government to power, announced that the airstrip would be upgraded to a domestic airport to serve the Trinidad-Tobago airbridge. If successful, the airport would be upgraded to a full-scale international airport.

If upgraded, the airport will be the third international airport on the islands after Piarco International Airport in Trinidad and the A.N.R. Robinson International Airport in Tobago.

== History ==
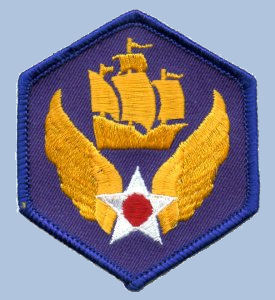
Camden Auxiliary Air Base
- Part of Sixth Air Force
- Couva, Trinidad and Tobago

Site information
- Type: Military Auxiliary Airfield
- Owner: United States of America
- Controlled by: United States Air Force

Location
- Coordinates: 10.426361°N 61.445672°W

Site history
- Built: 1942
- Built by: US Army Air Force
- In use: 1942-1949

The airstrip was built in 1942 by the United States. The area was used due to its flat lands and obstructionless approach paths. After World War 2, the airstrip was handed over to the government of Trinidad and Tobago.

The airport was unused until the late 1960s, when it started being used for cropdusting. It became unused in 2003 after the closure of the sugar industry.

In 2013, Trinidad and Tobago's Civil Aviation Authority conducted a feasibility study on the suitability of Camden as a general aviation airport. The strip was found to be attractive as an airport, and a six-phase development was recommended using a public/private partnership. The goal of the upgrade was to facilitate inter-island travel.

Throughout 2014, Trinidad and Tobago rescinded and reinstated the project to upgrade the airport on two occasions for unknown reasons. Since then, the airport has come under the control of the Air Guard.

== Operations ==
Aerial World Service Ltd is a flight school at the airport that offers training from private pilot all the way through to commercial pilot certification on technically advanced aircraft. They also offer private flights.

National Helicopter Services Limited NHSL is also present at the airport.

University of Trinidad and Tobago UTT operates an aviation campus at the airport.
