= Talparo =

Human settlement in Trinidad

Coordinates: 10°30′N 61°16′W

Map of Couva-Tabaquite-Talparo Regional Corporation, Trinidad and Tobago.

Talparo is a rural community in the Republic of Trinidad and Tobago. It is located in west-central Trinidad, and is administered by the Couva–Tabaquite–Talparo Regional Corporation.

== Religion ==
Talparo, is a mainly Roman Catholic Village in the East of Trinidad (Trinidad and Tobago).

Its Roman Catholic dominated population usually hold and attend church services on Sundays and observe Saturday as the Holy Sabbath.

== Entertainment ==
For entertainment in this small village, people usually attend and host parties.

There is also a park in this village.

The folk in this village believe in the folklore of the Douen.

There is also an annual village fest held in the community centre
