= Caroni–Arena Dam =

- Location within Trinidad and Tobago
- Country: Arena Forest Reserve, Arima, Caroni Plains, Trinidad and Tobago
- Coordinates: 10°32′N 61°14′W

The Caroni–Arena Dam is the largest dam in Trinidad and Tobago. It is located in the Arena Forest Reserve, south of Arima, in the eastern Caroni Plains. WASA supplies water to areas of central Trinidad by purifying the water from the dam. It was opened in the late 1970s/early 1980s.

== See also ==
- List of reservoirs and dams in Trinidad and Tobago
