= Couva =

- Town
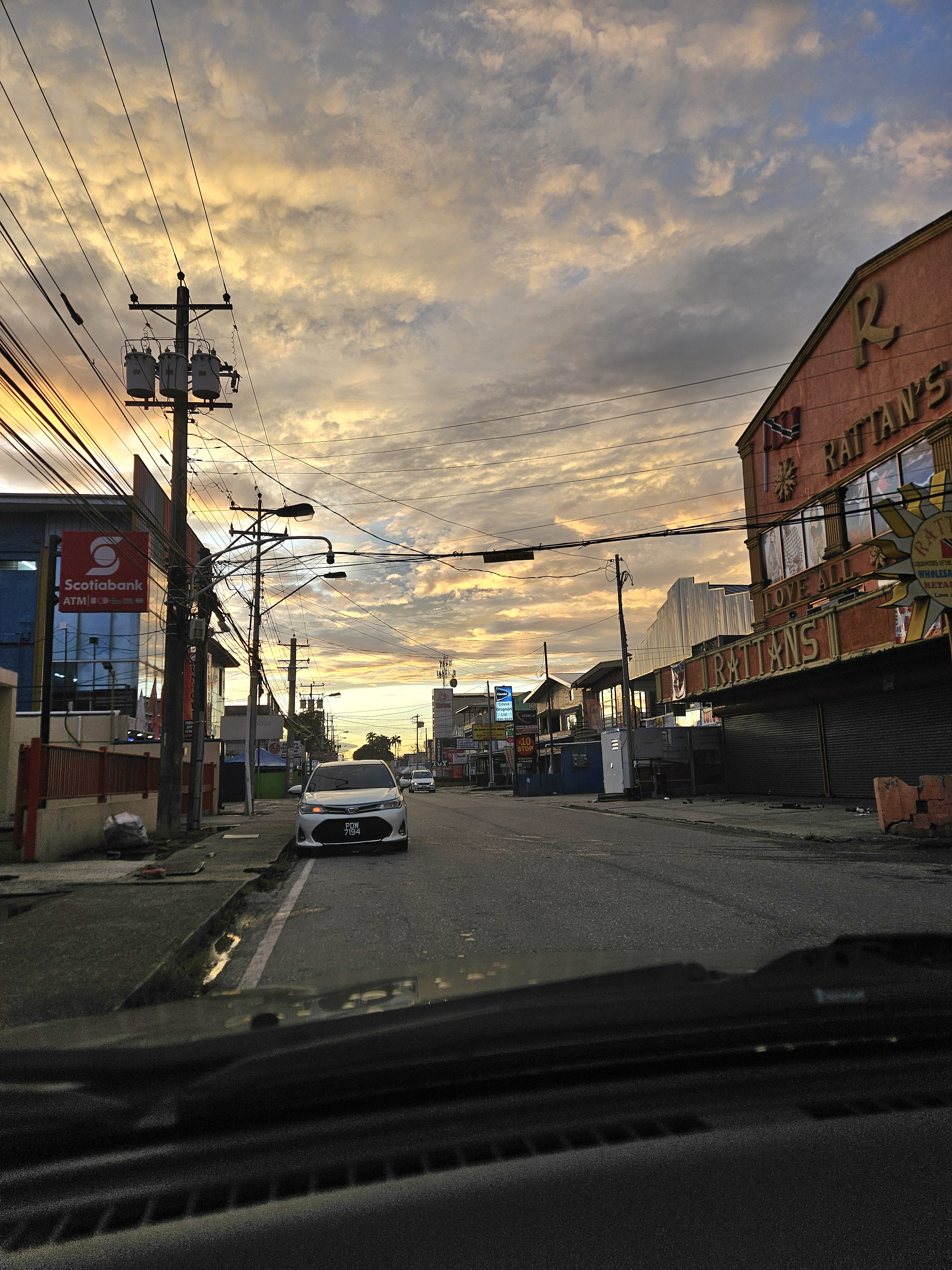
- Downtown Couva

- Location within Trinidad and Tobago Location within the Caribbean Location within North America
- Coordinates: 10°25′N 61°27′W
- Country: Trinidad and Tobago
- Region: Couva–Tabaquite–Talparo
- Settled: 1797
- Named for: Couva River

Government
  - Members of Parliament: List of MPs: Jearlean John (Couva North); Barry Padarath (Couva South)
  - Councillors: List of Councillors: Arelene S Solomon-Ramesar (United National Congress); Gangaram Gopaul (United National Congress); Ramchand Rajbal Maraj (United National Congress); Allan Seepersad (United National Congress); Vanessa Kussie (United National Congress)

Area
  - Total: 68.2 km^{2} (26.3 sq mi)
- Elevation: 47 m (154 ft)

Population (2011)
  - Total: 48,858
  - Rank: 5th
  - Density: 716/km^{2} (1,850/sq mi)
- Demonym: Couvan
- Time zone: UTC−4 (AST)
- Postal Code(s): 54xxxx, 55xxxx
- Area code: 868
- Telephone Exchanges: 636, 679, 830
- HDI The HDI for Trinidad and Tobago is 0.814, which gives the country a rank of 19th out of 177 countries with data (2007/2008) – high

Couva is a town in west-central Trinidad, south of Port of Spain and Chaguanas and north of San Fernando and Point Fortin. It is the capital and main urban centre of Couva–Tabaquite–Talparo, and the Greater Couva area includes the Point Lisas industrial estate and the port of Point Lisas. It is one of the fastest-growing towns in the country. Couva's southern boundary is at the village of California and Point Lisas, and to the north Couva stretches to McBean (both on the Trinidad Southern Main Road). To the east of Couva is Preysal. To the west of Couva is the road to Waterloo and Carli Bay, which are located on the Gulf of Paria. Couva was part of the Caroni County. Couva is considered a major power base for the United National Congress, whose headquarters was previously located here.

In October 2026, it was announced that Couva would again be separated from Tabaquite-Talparo and be converted into a borough.

== History ==
The first British map of Trinidad, made in 1797 after the island was surrendered by Spain, suggested the existence of a river in the area now known as Couva called "Rio de Cuba". Over time, perhaps due to the Spanish "B" having a sound similar to that of the letter "V" in English, the river became known as "Rio de Couva", which was eventually translated as "Couva River". British settlement of what is now referred to as Couva began a little to the north of the mouth of this river.

For many years, the village was little more than a clearing in a sugarcane field. Its population was mainly indentured workers of Indian origin with a smaller number of former African slaves and numbered no more than a few hundred. This all changed with the arrival of the railway to Couva in 1880. By 1921, it had grown to a population of 2,667, but in the decade leading up to 1931, this number fell to 1,895. During World War II, the Camden (Field) Auxiliary Air Base was established as an emergency airstrip. It included one paved 3,000 ft (910 m) by 150 ft (46 m) runway with extensive taxiways and dispersed camouflaged parking bays for the USAAC, USN, and RN. It was defended by US Army infantry and AAA units.

Couva continued to grow in size, with the national census recording a figure of 3,572 persons in 1980. Historically, the majority of its people have worked on the nearby sugar estates, but due to its strategic location, many residents have found employment with the oil refinery at Pointe-a-Pierre, only 13 km (8 mi) away and at the Point Lisas industrial estate located west of the town centre.

Couva was profoundly affected by the closure of Caroni (1975) Ltd. in the early 2000s, particularly its residents who worked on the nearby sugarcane estates and the associated small and medium enterprises that supported this industry. Since this period, the town has recovered through use of the now-open sugar lands for new housing and business initiatives. Consequently, while the nearby town of Chaguanas has evolved and expanded significantly to become the de facto administrative and commercial capital of central Trinidad, Couva's character has changed to become a magnet for industrialisation, commercial, sports, health, education, aviation, and residential projects.

== Climate ==
The climate of Couva is tropical, more specifically tropical monsoon, with a short dry season February to April and a lengthy wet season May to January. Temperatures vary little between the wet and dry seasons.

Climate data for Couva, Trinidad and Tobago
Month	Jan	Feb	Mar	Apr	May	Jun	Jul	Aug	Sep	Oct	Nov	Dec	Year
Record high °C (°F)	31 (88)	32 (90)	34 (93)	33 (91)	32 (90)	32 (90)	32 (90)	33 (91)	33 (91)	34 (93)	34 (93)	31 (88)	34 (93)
Mean daily maximum °C (°F)	29 (84)	30 (86)	30 (86)	31 (88)	31 (88)	30 (86)	30 (86)	31 (88)	31 (88)	30 (86)	30 (86)	29 (84)	30 (86)
Mean daily minimum °C (°F)	25 (77)	25 (77)	25 (77)	26 (79)	26 (79)	26 (79)	26 (79)	27 (81)	27 (81)	27 (81)	26 (79)	26 (79)	26 (79)
Record low °C (°F)	14 (57)	16 (61)	16 (61)	17 (63)	18 (64)	19 (66)	18 (64)	18 (64)	19 (66)	19 (66)	17 (63)	15 (59)	14 (57)
Average rainfall mm (inches)	71.1 (2.80)	43.2 (1.70)	30.5 (1.20)	45.7 (1.80)	111.8 (4.40)	254.0 (10.00)	248.9 (9.80)	238.8 (9.40)	182.9 (7.20)	177.8 (7.00)	198.1 (7.80)	147.3 (5.80)	1,750.1 (68.9)
Average precipitation days (≥ 0.1 mm)	12	9	4	6	10	19	21	17	17	16	17	15	253
Average relative humidity (%)	81	80	77	77	79	84	84	84	84	85	86	84	82
Mean monthly sunshine hours	241.3	231.3	248.3	237.5	233.2	183.7	205.9	212.5	197.1	207.4	197.7	214.5	2,610.4
Source 1: The Weather Channel (records)
Source 2: World Weather Online Source #3: MSN Weather (records) Source #4: World Meteorological Organization Source #4: NOAA (sun, extremes and humidity)

== Development and demise of the sugar production industry ==
In 1937, two major developments occurred on the sugar lands of Central Trinidad. One was the formation of the All Trinidad Sugar Estates Factory Workers Trade Union, which for the first time gave representation to many thousands of sugar workers who had revolted in 1935, 1936, and 1937 against slave conditions on the sugar estates. Under the leadership of Adrian Cola Rienzi, they transformed the nature of the industry.

At the same time, Caroni (1937) was created when Tate and Lyle, a British multinational company, bought our Caroni Sugar Estates (Trinidad) Ltd making a conglomerate that included Waterloo on the western coast and Brechin Castle in Couva. By 1940, the landscape of its headquarters, Brechin Castle, was changed by the construction of the factory and the four cooling ponds at the back, as well as major company offices, the dispensary, Sevilla School, Sevilla Club, and residences for mainly expatriate senior staff.

In 1960, Caroni bought out Usine Ste. Madeleine factory, which had grown considerably since its founding in 1870. In 1975, the state bought the conglomerate, calling it Caroni (1975) Ltd, which continued producing sugar, but went into diversification, producing citrus, prawns, large and small ruminants, and rice.

By the end of the 20th century, as oil became increasingly significant, the sugar industry and agriculture generally sank into a low second place until the state closed down Caroni Ltd in 2003, retrenching 9,000 workers directly and a further 35,000 who were indirectly dependent on the industry. Consequently, just over 75,000 acres (30,000 ha) of land became available for other uses.

== Establishment of Point Lisas ==
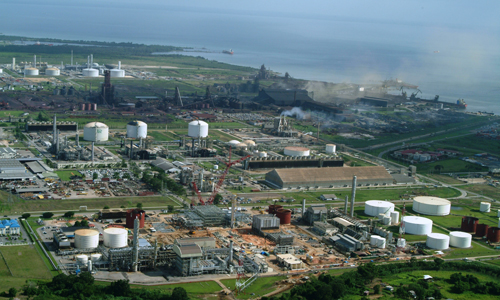
Point Lisas Port and Industrial Estate, Couva

Point Lisas is a petrochemical and heavy industrial estate clustered around a series of port facilities on Trinidad's sheltered western coastline. Construction of major plants in the estate began in the 1970s. Since then, the Point Lisas industrial estate has been a major success story in Trinidad and Tobago's recent economic history, and the development of natural gas-based industry on the estate has been a major impetus for the transformation of Trinidad and Tobago into a gas-based economy. The location at Point Lisas was chosen due to the nature of the coastline and crucially the availability of large tracts of flat, undeveloped land next to the coast. This landholding belonged to Caroni Ltd, at that time a private company owned by Tate and Lyle in London.

The "estate" is now home to over 90 companies, e.g. YARA, Phoenix Park Gas Processors Ltd. (PPGPL), PLIPDECO, and Methanex. This includes the world's largest methanol plant, along with five additional plants, produces about 13% of global methanol output. National Gas Company of Trinidad and Tobago (NGC) was founded alongside this as an aggregator and distributor of feedstock provided by the upstream. The idea behind NGC was to consolidate supply and provide guaranteed distribution to the various consumers at the end of its pipeline network. The elimination of large contracts between upstream and downstream created an efficient system of gas flow on which the estate was fed.

== Urban structure ==
Couva is about 15 km from San Fernando, 10 km from Chaguanas, and 30 km from Port of Spain. It has a general east–west orientation. The Sir Solomon Hochoy Highway provides access to Port of Spain, San Fernando and Chaguanas.

The urban structure of Couva is similar to that of most towns in central Trinidad, with a mix of residential and commercial activity. Couva's major urban areas are downtown Couva, McBean Village (north of Couva town centre), Balmain including Central Park (east of the town centre), Isaac Settlement (south of the Southern Main Road), Lisas Gardens construction by the government (bounded between the Southern Main Road and Rivulet Road), Exchange Lots (north of Southern Main Road and in the centre of the town), California, Camden, and Couva North Gardens and Roystonia (north of Southern Main Road and occupies the former Exchange Estate area).

Phases 1–3 of the Couva North Housing Project (in Perseverance) was built by the Trinidad and Tobago Housing Development Corporation (HDC), and like Lisas Gardens, is primarily Afro-Trinidadian. The HDC entered into a joint-venture arrangement with the private sector to design, finance, and construct Phases 4–6 of the Couva North Housing Project, also known as Roystonia. Under this arrangement, the development of over 170 ha (420 acres) of land, from Perseverance to the Southern Main Road, has been constructed and delivered in excess of 1,000 homes. This development has attracted primarily Indo-Trinidadian of middle income or upper-middle income background into the Couva area. These new communities have profoundly changed the character of the town and significantly increased its overall population. The community is located east of Perseverance/Waterloo Main Road, west of the Southern Main Road, north of Southern Main Road/Carli Bay Road, and south of the Exchange Road, Couva.

Also, substantial residential developments are in progress within the Couva region on former Caroni (1975) Ltd. lands. Consequently, the current services within Couva are under strain and are in state of transition or expansion to incorporate the new influx of residential activity.

=== Areas in Couva ===
Couva consists of these main population centres:

==== Communities ====
- Downtown Couva
- Point Lisas
- California
- Balmain
- Preysal
- McBean
- Orange Valley
- St. Andrew
- Exchange
- Camden
- Roystonia
- Couva Village Plaza
- Couva North Gardens
- Perseverance
- Sevilla
- Brechin Castle
- Indian Trail
- Issac Settlement
- Calcutta Settlement
- Union Village
- Basta Hall
- Felicity Hall
- Esperanza
- Carolina
- Milton
- Dow Village
- Savonetta
- Shashamane
- Phoenix Park
- Windsor Park
- Central Park
- Vista Park
- Olive Grove Estates
- Lisas Gardens

==== Beaches and bays ====
- Carli Bay
- Lisas Bay
- Congrejas Bay
- Margaret Bay

=== Electoral districts ===
The electoral districts in Couva for the Couva-Tabaquite-Talparo region are Couva East/Balmain, Brechin Castle/Esperanza, Calcutta #3/McBean, Couva West/Roystonia and Savonetta/Point Lisas

== Economy ==
Couva is the administrative and commercial centre of the region and the Point Lisas Port and Industrial Estate falls within the greater Couva urban area. By 2011, Couva had the highest number (1789) of businesses in the region.

The main economic sectors in the region are:

- Industrial development based on the existence of cement manufacturing in Claxton Bay by the Trinidad Cement Limited (TCL), petrochemical related industries at Point Lisas, Petrotrin’s oil refinery operations at Pointe-à-Pierre, and small light industry parks established by the Evolving Technologies and Enterprise Development Company (eTeck)
- Commercial business activities largely restricted to retail trade (personal and household products, auto parts and services, banks, minimarts and groceries, etc.)
- Agricultural activities comprising livestock rearing, mixed agriculture, and other agriculture

The town is served by all the major banks in Trinidad, e.g. Scotiabank (SCB), First Citizens Bank (FCB), Royal Bank of Canada (RBC), Republic Bank, and also the Unit Trust Corporation (UTC). Inclusive of these banks, there are numerous credit unions currently existing in Couva, e.g. TECU, Venture Credit Union. The Couva-Pt. Lisas Chamber of Commerce headquarters is within Couva located on Camden Road, and its new building was commissioned 2012.

In addition, six beaches are in the region, where significant amounts and value of fish are landed. These beaches are Brickfield, Claxton Bay, Carli Bay, Orange Valley, St. Margaret Bay, and Waterloo.

== Transport ==
The primary means of access to the region from areas in north and south Trinidad are the Sir Solomon Hochoy Highway and the Southern Main Road. Also, a route between Chaguanas and Rio Claro, in the form of the Caparo Valley Brasso Road and the Tabaquite Rio Claro Road, runs diagonally through the region. No strong road links the areas to the east of the region.

The Couva/Preysal flyover was previously one of the most congested flyovers in the country, and the main access point to and from the highway, but has undergone an extensive upgrade (completed in March 2012) and significantly alleviated these problems. Rivulet Road which extends from the Couva/Preysal flyover to the Point Lisas roundabout (and runs almost the entire south-west length of Couva) was extended to have a shoulder in 2015. This is expected to allow ease of traffic directly to the Point Lisas and the Couva town centre.

Access is also possible by sea through existing industrial port facilities at Point Lisas, which handles roughly 45% of container cargo and 90% of break bulk cargo (goods that do not ship in containers) for the country. The port also handles about 60% of local manufacturers' goods for export. Port Point Lisas is the second major port in Trinidad and covers a total area around 19 hectares.

An airstrip is located on the outskirts of the town called the Camden Airstrip, which was originally built by the US military during World War II. It handles helicopters and light aircraft, and has a 4,000 ft (1,200 m) by 50 ft (15 m) paved runway. It is the main operating base of both National Helicopter Services Limited and Briko Air Services. Passenger flights are handled through Piarco International Airport, which is located 23 km away from Couva.

== Demography ==
In 2000, Couva had 36,659 inhabitants.

== Education ==
The University of Trinidad and Tobago (UTT) Point Lisas campus is located on Esperanza Road. With its genesis in the Trinidad and Tobago Institute of Technology (TTIT), UTT initially focused on programmes in engineering and technology. UTT also operates an aviation campus at Camden Base A first construction phase was completed in 2015 which includes classrooms, flight-device training facilities, ancillary facilities, outfitting, and consultancy services.

Holy Faith Convent Couva, located on the Couva Main Road in Exchange Lots, was the first secondary school in the central rural area. Established in 1951, it remained small until the introduction of free education in the 1960s. However, the warm, loving family atmosphere of the small school was well grounded to adapt, not only to over 700 pupils, but also to a multidenominational student body today.

The Couva East Secondary School (formerly known as Couva Government Secondary School) was built in 1963 and is directly opposite the Couva Magistrates Courthouse on Church Street. The school rose to prominence during the 1970s and 1980s, and since then has earned several national scholarships, and most scholarships gained by a government-run secondary school, which is also among the best of the government secondary schools in the country. Today, the school remains prestigious within the Couva area. The Couva West Secondary School (the former Couva Junior Secondary School established in 1972) is located on Balisier Street, Couva. The Preysal Secondary School is located on Couva Main Road, Preysal, Couva.

The Exchange Presbyterian Primary School (at the corner of Bryce and La Croix Streets), has been consistently ranked highly in the national SEA examinations. The Exchange R.C. primary school is part of the compound of the St. Paul R.C. Church, and the Couva Anglican Primary is located further west on the Southern Main Road. The most recent of primary schools, the Couva South Government primary school is on Lisas Blvd. The Sevilla Private Primary School in the Brechin Castle residential compound is also considered one of the most prestigious schools in the region. There are several other primary schools within the wider Couva area (Balmain & McBean Presbyterian, McBean Hindu, Orange Valley Government).

The Rudranath Capildeo Learning Resource Centre is located in McBean Village. It is a training hub for professionals of the education sector, and is geared towards encouraging tertiary research in all aspects of education among the Ministry of Education's staff. Its services extend further into the community, though, drawing users from the teacher-training colleges, the University of the West Indies, and other institutions and libraries, as well as members of the general public.

The NESC Skills and Technology Centre, Point Lisas, is the main campus of the NESC. The centre, at the corner of Rivulet and Southern Main Roads, Point Lisas, replaced NESC's centre at Brechin Castle, which was transferred to the University of Trinidad and Tobago.

The construction of the NIHERST Science City in Indian Trail is planned for learning of science and technology. the centre will cover 52 acres (21 ha) and is an expansion of the National Science Centre in D'Abadie .

== Sport ==
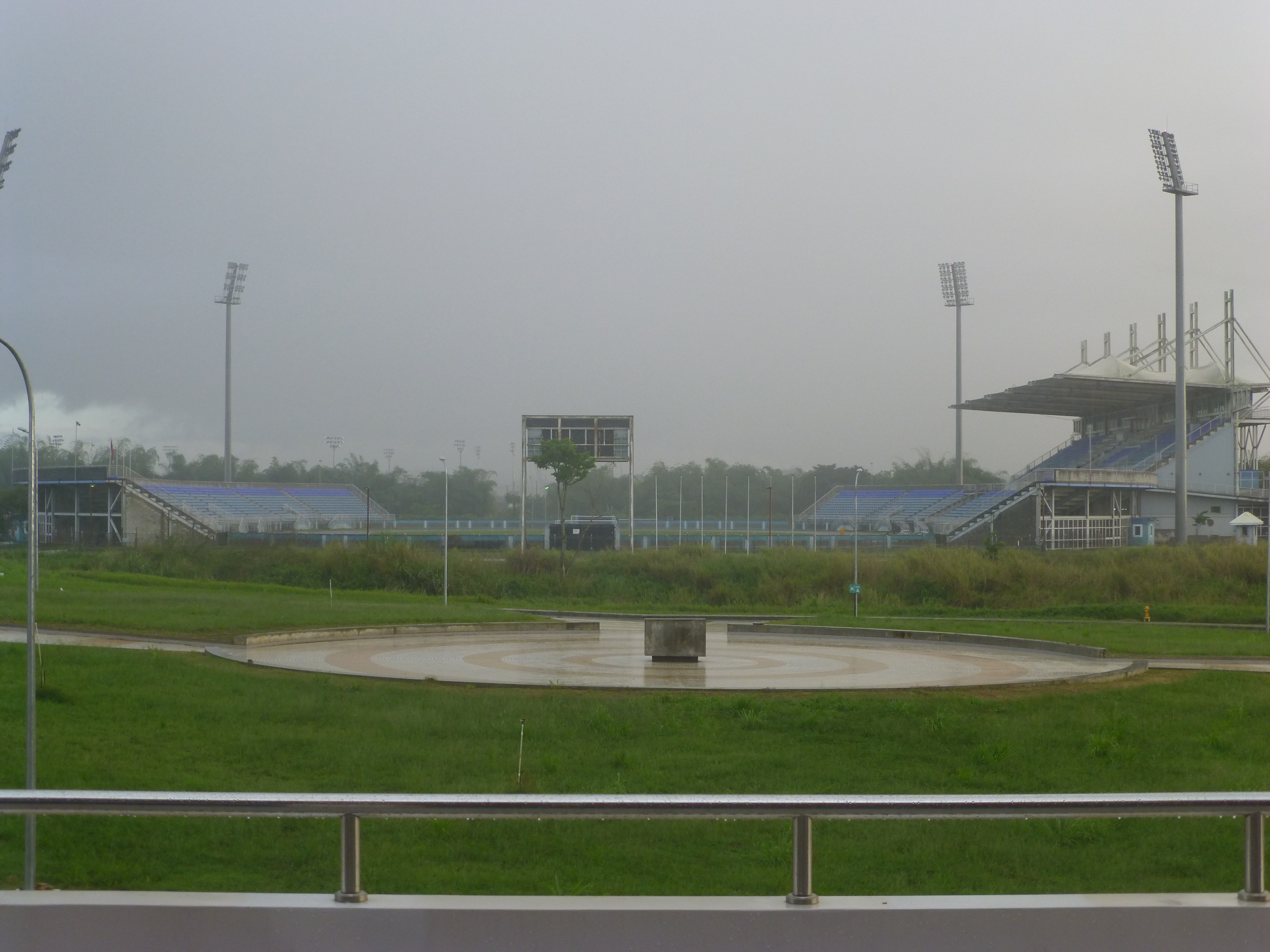
Ato Boldon Stadium

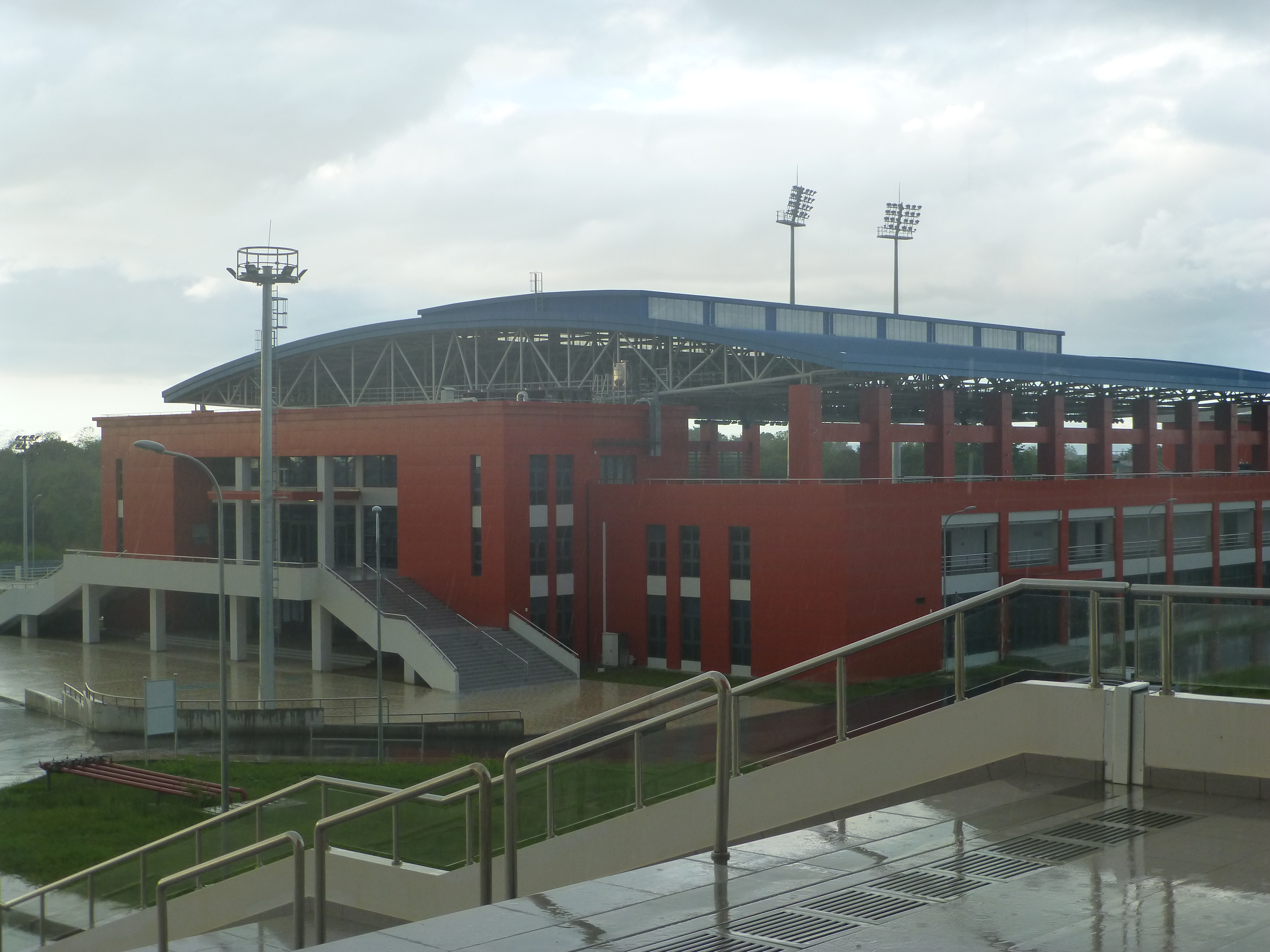
National Aquatic Centre

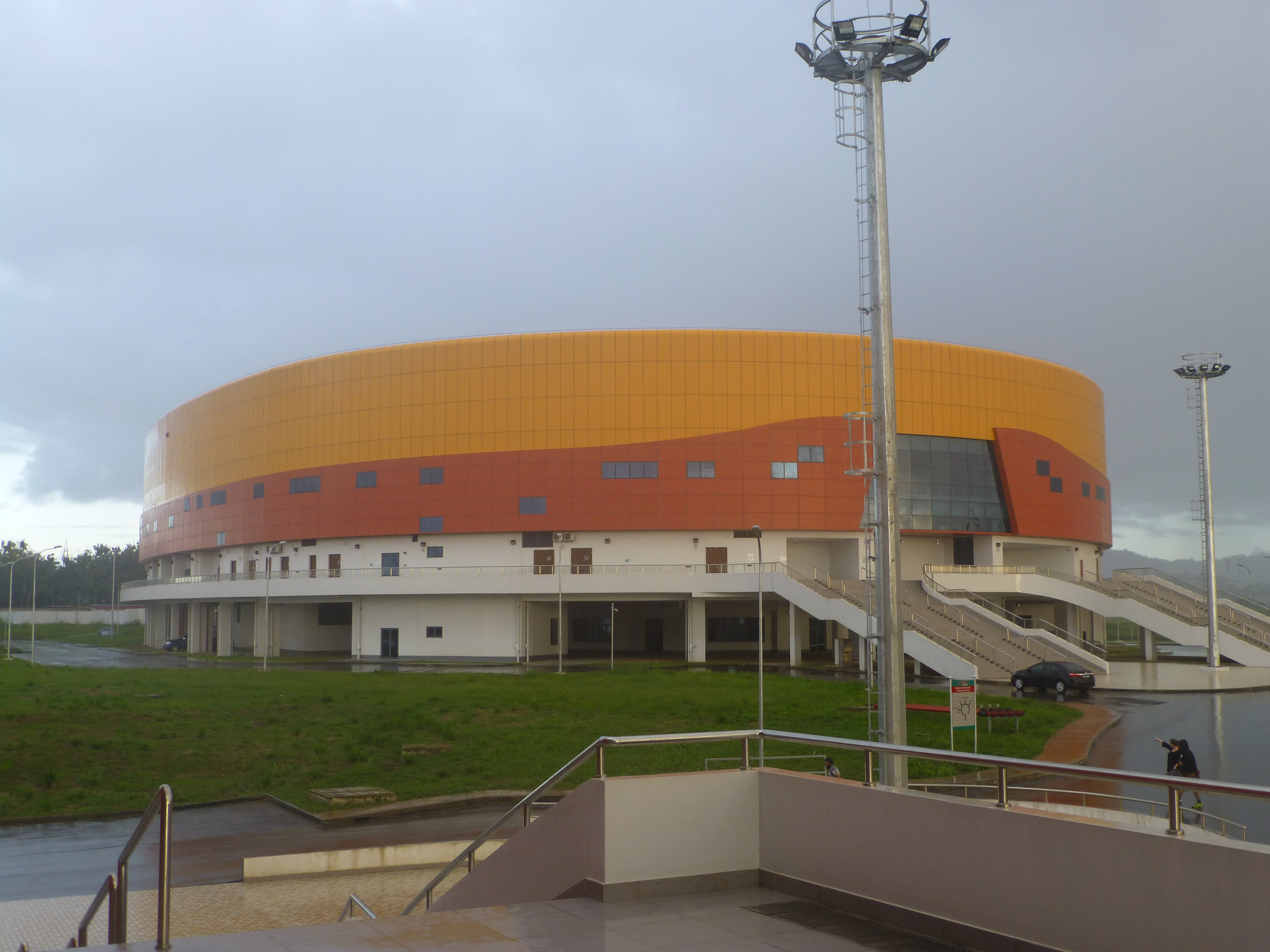
National Cycling Centre

The Ato Boldon Stadium, located in Couva, Trinidad and Tobago, is named after eight-time Olympic and World Championship medal winner and 1997 200 m world champion Ato Boldon. The stadium was constructed in 2001. The National Men's Team and Women's Team use the stadium as their training centre. ABS is also the home of athletics. Every year, various national tournaments and invitationals are held by various clubs and by the National Athletic Association. The capacity of the stadium is around 10,000 persons. Central FC plays its home games at the stadium. Outside Trinidad and Tobago the stadium is best known for being the location of the match played on 10 October 2017, when the Trinidad and Tobago national team defeated the United States 2–1, which meant the United States failed to qualify for the 2018 FIFA World Cup.

The Sevilla Sports Club, located south of Rivulet Road, includes two tennis courts, a swimming pool, a golf course, and snooker facilities. The Brechin Castle Golf Course started out as a 9-hole course in 1927 and was increased to an 18-hole course in 1929/1930, but by 1938, nine holes had been reclaimed by the sugarcane factory when crops were planted on the site and houses were built on it. The course is being used regularly for tournaments by other clubs and it also has its monthly medal games. The club house, called Seville Club, was formerly the residence of the manager of Brechin Castle. The National Cricket Centre (NCC) was opened by the Trinidad and Tobago Cricket Board (TTCBC) in 2002 on 17.5 acres (7.1 ha) of land at Balmain, Couva from Caroni (1975) Ltd. (construction started in 1997). The Trinidad and Tobago Cricket Board plans to rehabilitate, refurbish and develop the Balmain Cricket Centre to allow for playing cricket at the regional first-class level. The Gilbert Park cricket ground is located on the corner of the Southern Main Road and Rivulet Road. The Couva Recreation Ground and Balmain Cricket club ground are notable sporting areas in the town. W Connection, Wanderers C.C. and Clico Preysal Sports Club are notable cricket clubs in the Couva catchment area.

The National Aquatic Centre and National Cycle Track were opened in 2015 in the vicinity of the Ato Boldon Stadium. The Aquatic Centre includes a 50-metre swimming pool (to provide facilities for the hosting of and training for international competitions), a 50-metre warm-up pool, a 25-metre diving pool, and total permanent seating capacity of 700 seats. The National Cycle Track includes a 250-by-7-metre (820 ft × 23 ft) wood cycling track with embankment of 42 degrees to the International Cycle Union (UCI) standard Category 1, and 2,500 seats in the cycling track configuration.

The Couva public swimming pool is located in Railway Station Road.

== Culture ==
Couva generated much of its prominence from the production of sugar. To commemorate its historical involvement in the sugar industry, the Sugar and Energy Festival was founded by the Couva/Point Lisas Chamber of Commerce and held at the Gilbert Park grounds annually.

Culturally, the town is the home of Couva Joylanders Steel Orchestra. The band holds its practice sessions in a steelpan complex at Railway Road, Couva, built by the Ministry of Works and Infrastructure in conjunction with National Gas Company of Trinidad and Tobago.

Couva is the setting of Derek Walcott's play Beef, No Chicken.

== Notable people ==
- Neil Benjamin
- Brian Haynes
- Rangy Nanan
- Rampersad Parasram
- Roshan Parasram
- Nicholas Pooran
- Denesh Ramdin
- Mark Deyal
- Lall Ramnath Sawh
- Silvio Spann
- Sarran Teelucksingh
- La Toya Woods

== Sister cities ==
- Hartford, Connecticut, United States
