= Divali Nagar =

Festival in Trinidad and Tobago

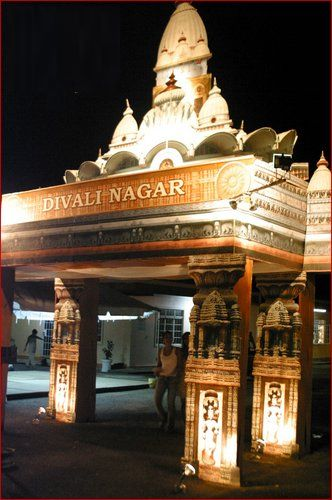
Divali Nagar

Deyas flickering in the wind

Divali Nagar (City of Divali) is an annual exposition of Hindu culture (broadly) and Indo-Trinidadian culture (specifically), it is associated with the celebration of Diwali in Trinidad and Tobago. The exposition is staged at the Divali Nagar Site, located in the borough of Chaguanas. This event was started in the Mid Centre Mall car park in late 1986. It was given a permanent site on the John Peters Road Extension off the Uriah Butler Highway a couple of years after.

Although organised as a religious and cultural presentation, Divali Nagar has been criticised by some for the level of commercialization associated with the endeavour. Commercial activity, however, partly funds the Nagar, which really consumes a lot of resources. Emphasis must be placed on the several cultural and religious parts of the programme every year and the enormous positive impact it has had in Trinidad and the Caribbean as well as the diaspora living abroad. Diwali Nagar is the most significant Indian cultural event of the T&T and possibly in the wider Caribbean and North America. It has set a trend in that now South Florida and other places have Diwali Nagars of their own. The festivities usually start one week prior to the annual Divali day holiday and finishes the night before Divali. The Nagar culminates with extensive fireworks show on the final night. Diwali Nagar was born out of a concept enunciated by Hans Hanoomansingh, then President of the National Council of Indian Culture and was organized by a team of dedicated individuals, led by Rampersad Parasram, first chairman of Diwali Nagar. Deokinanan Sharma, current president of NCIC, was chairman for many years At the commencement of Divali Nagar 2011, which marked its 25th anniversary, pioneers of Diwali Nagar were honoured.

The Divali Nagar site is utilised during the year for educational seminars, Indian Arrival Day festivities, charitable events, religious festivities and wedding receptions. The site is also used for trade exhibitors from India selling religious and cultural merchandise.
