= Couva–Tabaquite–Talparo =

Couva–Tabaquite–Talparo CTTRC
- Region
- Region of Couva–Tabaquite–Talparo
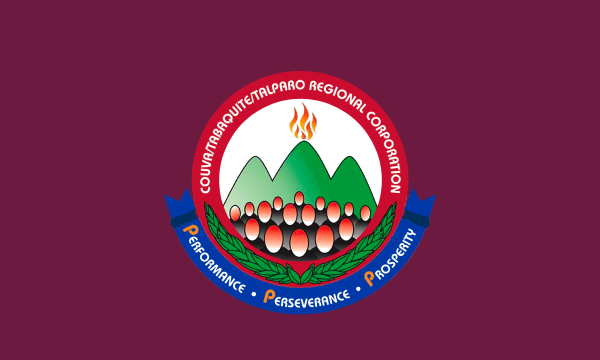
- Flag
- Motto: Performance, Perseverance, Prosperity
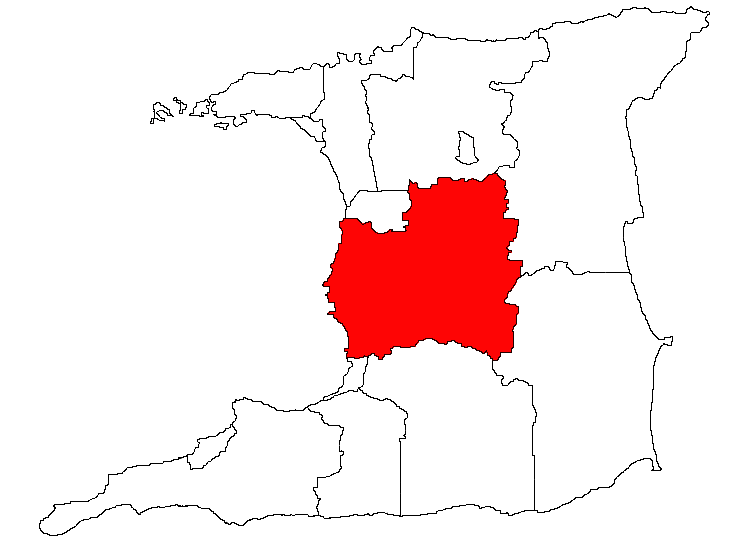
- Location of Couva–Tabaquite–Talparo in Trinidad
- Country: Trinidad and Tobago
- Historic Counties: Saint George; Caroni; Victoria
- Former Regions: Couva; Tabaquite–Talparo
- Coastline: Gulf of Paria (Caribbean Sea)
- Founded: 17 July 1992
- Capital: Couva

Government
  - Chairman: Ryan Rampersad
  - Councillors: List of Councillors: Anil Baliram (UNC); Dubraj Persad (UNC); Gangaram Gopaul (UNC); John Lezama (UNC); Balmati Gosyne (UNC); Allan Seepersad (UNC); Vishan Mohammed (UNC); Sharen Badal-Ahyew (UNC); Ramchand Rajbal Maraj (UNC); Vanessa Kussie (UNC); Shazeeda Khan-Mohammed (UNC); Ravi Pooran Maraj (UNC); Arlene Solomon-Ramesar (UNC); Ryan Rampersad (UNC); Henry Awong (UNC)
  - Aldermen: List of Aldermen: Wazim Dill Mohammed (UNC); Anil Kamal (UNC); Paul Bandoo (UNC); Lee Dharam-Singh (UNC)

Area
  - Total: 723 km^{2} (279 sq mi)

Population (2011)
  - Total: 178,410
  - Density: 247/km^{2} (640/sq mi)
- Time zone: UTC-4 (AST)
- Postal Code: 53xxxx - 58xxxx
- Area code: 868
- ISO 3166 code: TT-CTT
- HDI (2009): 0.678 (7th)
- Telephone exchanges: 636, 679, 830, 630, 650, 659, 673
- Website: cttrc.gov.tt

Couva–Tabaquite–Talparo is one of the nine regions of Trinidad and Tobago, and one of the five regions which form the Gulf of Paria coastline on Trinidad's West Coast. Its regional capital and commercial center is Couva. Couva–Tabaquite–Talparo is the third-largest of Trinidad and Tobago's nine regions, with an area of 723 square kilometres (300 sq mi). As of 2011, the population was 178,410. The region is the second-most populous and fourth-least-densely populated region in Trinidad with 247 inhabitants per square kilometre (640/sq mi).

Couva–Tabaquite–Talparo is bordered by the Gulf of Paria to the west, the Borough of Chaguanas to the north-west, Tunapuna–Piarco region to the north, Sangre Grande and Mayaro–Rio Claro to the east, Princes Town to the south and the City of San Fernando to the south-west. The region is directly adjacent to the Venezuelan state of Monagas to west separated by the Gulf of Paria.

== Geography ==
Couva–Tabaquite–Talparo is Trinidad and Tobago's third largest region in area after Sangre Grande and Rio Claro–Mayaro. The region is situated in Central Trinidad within the Caroni Plains bordering the Gulf of Paria to west. It was a major region for sugar and cocoa production in the 18th and 19th centuries and the first half of the 20th century. The region features the Caroni–Arena Dam which supplies water to the northern regions of Trinidad and Navet Dam which supplies water to much of Central and Southern regions Trinidad. Much of the Central Range lies in the region which is home to the Brasso Venado and Gran Couva Waterfall. Couva–Tabaquite–Talparo also houses the Pointe-à-Pierre Wild Fowl Trust in Pointe-à-Pierre.

=== Wildlife ===
The Point-a-Pierre Wild Fowl Trust is located on the compound of a major petrochemical and oil refinery in south Trinidad. Encompassing two lakes and about 30 hectares of land the Trust is a popular destination for scientists and researchers. The Trust is the only eco-tourism site on the island with a boardwalk built along much of the first pond where there is also a small Amerindian museum. Point-a-Pierre Wild Fowl Trust is a wetland habitat that is home to locally endangered wetland birds. With over 26 hectares, there are about 90 bird species, including endangered waterfowl, songbirds, scarlet ibis, herons and other wading birds.

== Demographics ==
=== Population ===
The Trinidad and Tobago Central Statistical Office reported the population of Couva–Tabaquite–Talparo was 178,410 on January 9, 2011, a 0.9% increase since the 2000 Census. The population of Couva–Tabaquite–Talparo in the 2000 census was 162,779.

Historical populations
Year	Pop.	±%
2000	162,779	—
2011	178,410	+9.6%

=== Ancestry ===
Couva–Tabaquite–Talparo racial breakdown
Racial composition	2011
South Asian (Indo-Trinidadian)	57.65%
Black (Afro-Trinidadian/Tobagonian)	18.94%
Multiracial	10.7%
Dougla (South Asian and Black)	7.3%
West Asian (Chinese)	0.16%
Native American (Amerindian)	0.6%
Arab (Syrian/Lebanese)	0.1%
White Trinidadian	0.12%
Other	0.8%
Not stated	4.8%

=== Religion ===
Religion in Couva–Tabaquite–Talparo (2011 census)
Religion	Percent
Christianity	49.3%
Hinduism	34.3%
Islam	8.1%
Other	6.9%
None/not shared	1.4%

=== Urban Centers and Towns ===
Largest cities or towns in Couva–Tabaquite–Talparo 2011 Census
Rank		Historic County	Pop.
1	Couva	Caroni	48,858
2	Gasparillo	Victoria	16,426
3	Claxton Bay	Victoria	14,436
4	Freeport	Caroni	11,850
5	Carapichaima	Caroni	5,995
6	Chase Village	Caroni	4,014
7	Tabaquite	Saint George	3,138
8	Caparo	Caroni	2,979
9	St. Mary's	Caroni	2,240
10	Talparo	Saint George	1,661

==== Electoral Districts ====
Electoral Districts within Couva–Tabaquite–Talparo Regional Corporation include:

- Brechin Castle / Esperanza
- Capara / Mamoral
- Caratal / Tortuga
- Calcutta #3 / Mc Bean
- Couva East / Balmain
- Couva West / Roystonia
- Claxton Bay / Pointe-a-Pierre
- Freeport / Chickland
- Gasparillo / Bonne Aventure
- Las Lomas / San Rafael
- Longdenville / Talparo
- Perseverance / Waterloo
- Piparo / San Pedro / Tabaquite
- Savonetta / Point Lisas
- St Mary's / Carlsen Field

In the 2023 Local Government Elections, the Elections and Boundaries Commission allocated four Alderman positions to the Couva–Tabaquite–Talparo Regional Corporation, which is part of a 15-electoral district system. The individuals elected to these positions were:

- Wazim Dill Mohammed
- Anil Kamal
- Paul Bandoo
- Lee Dharam-Singh.

Notably, Wazim Dill Mohammed was sworn in as an Alderman at the age of 25, making him one of the youngest individuals in the history of the nation to hold this position.
