= Chaguanas =

- Borough
- Borough of Chaguanas
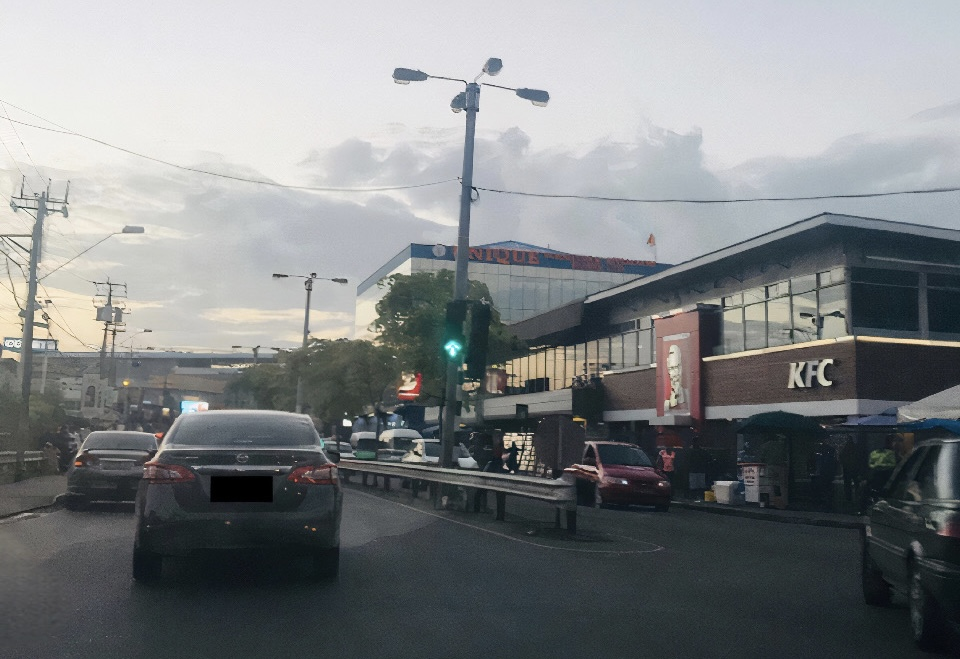
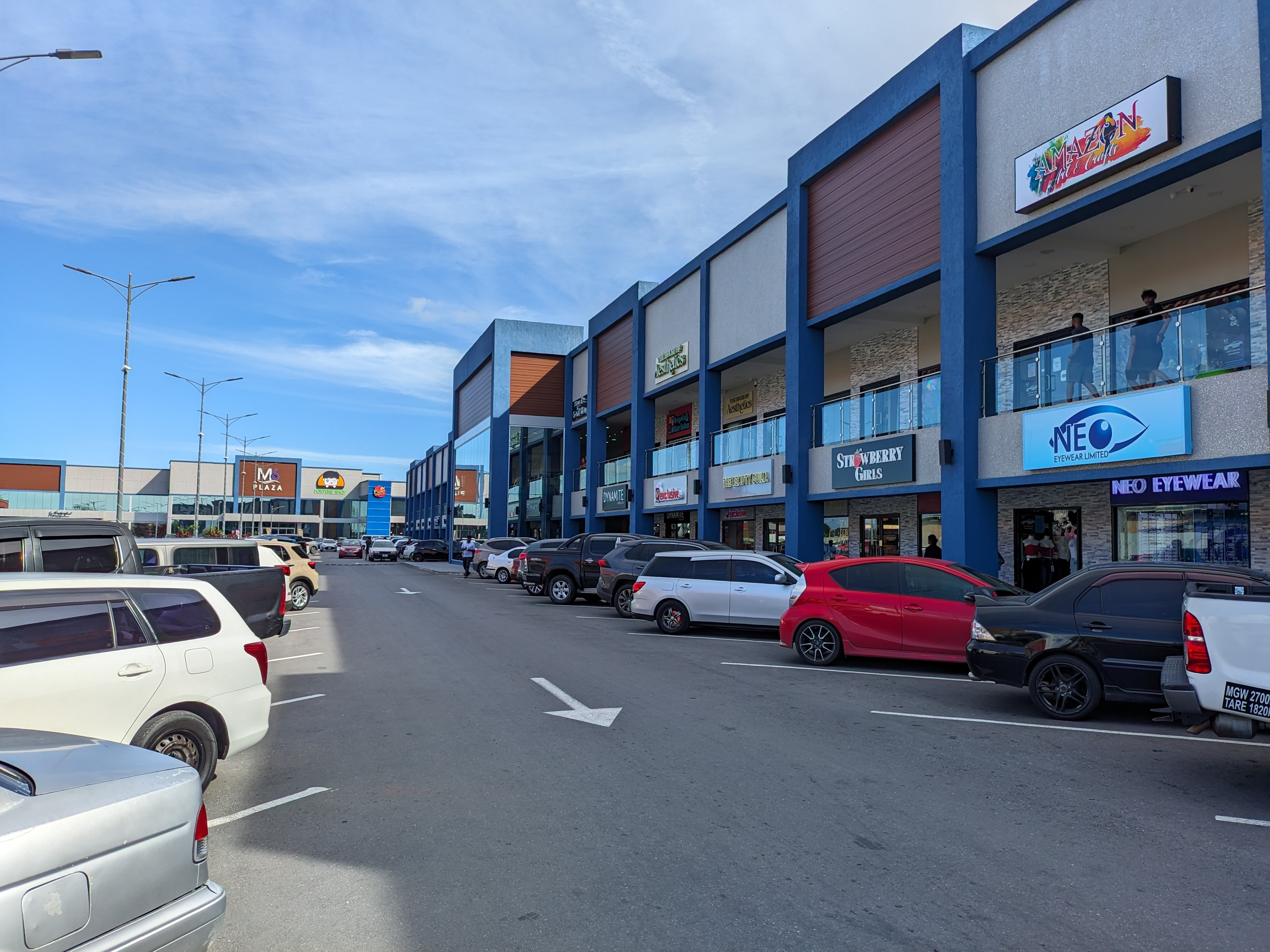
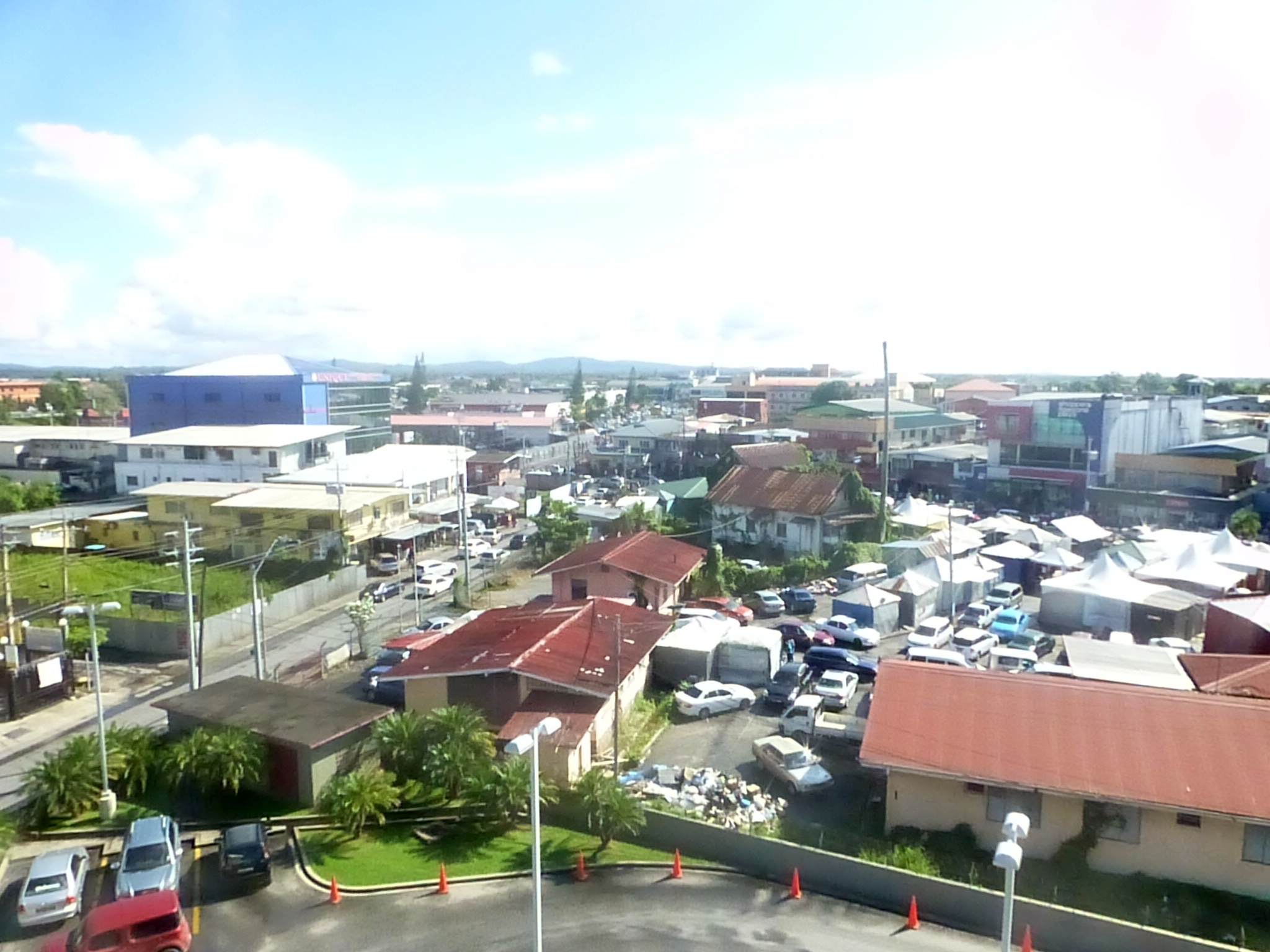
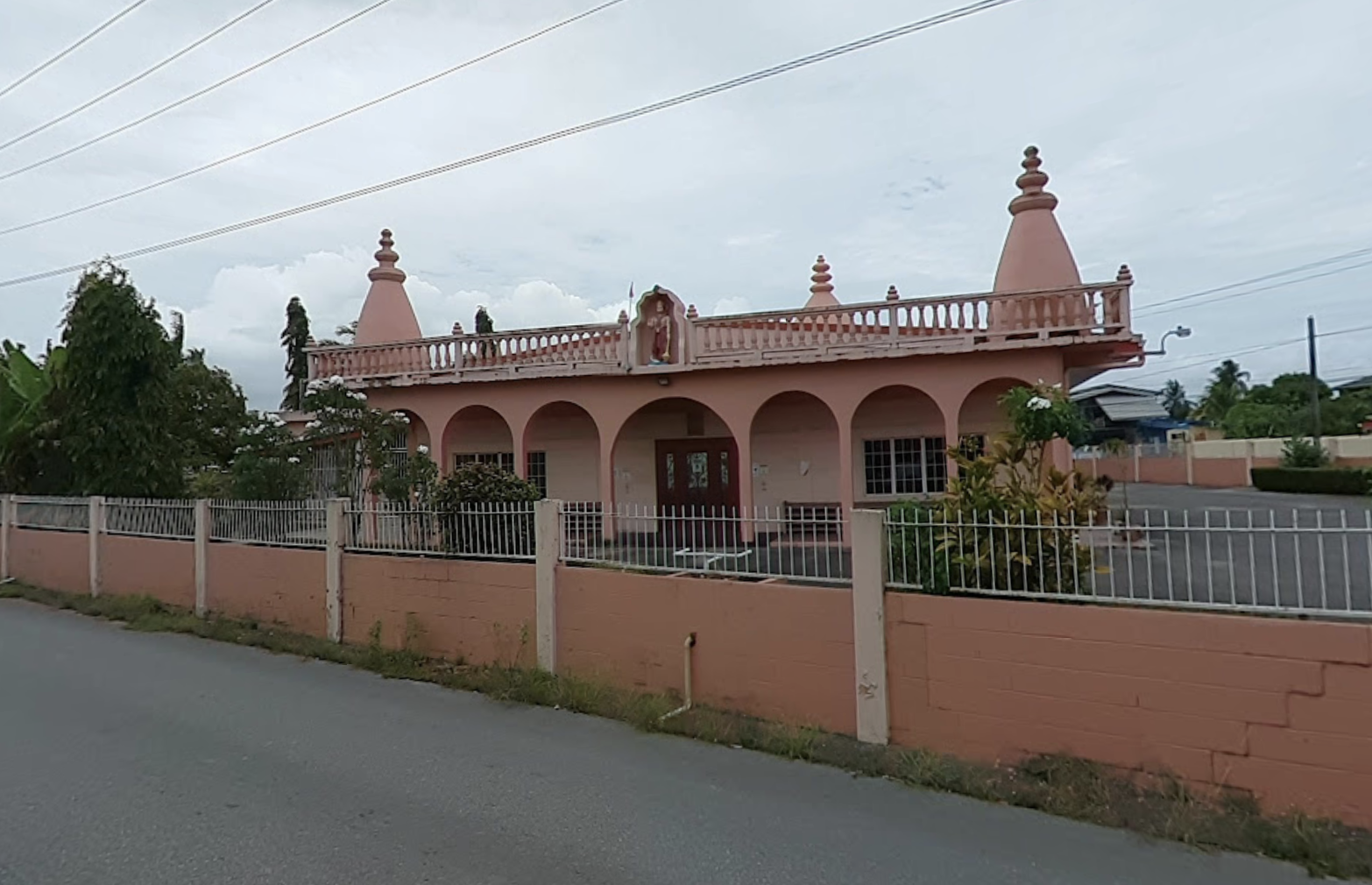
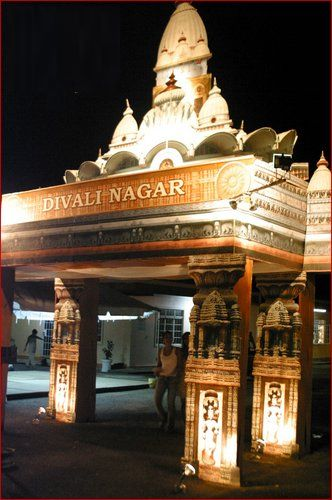
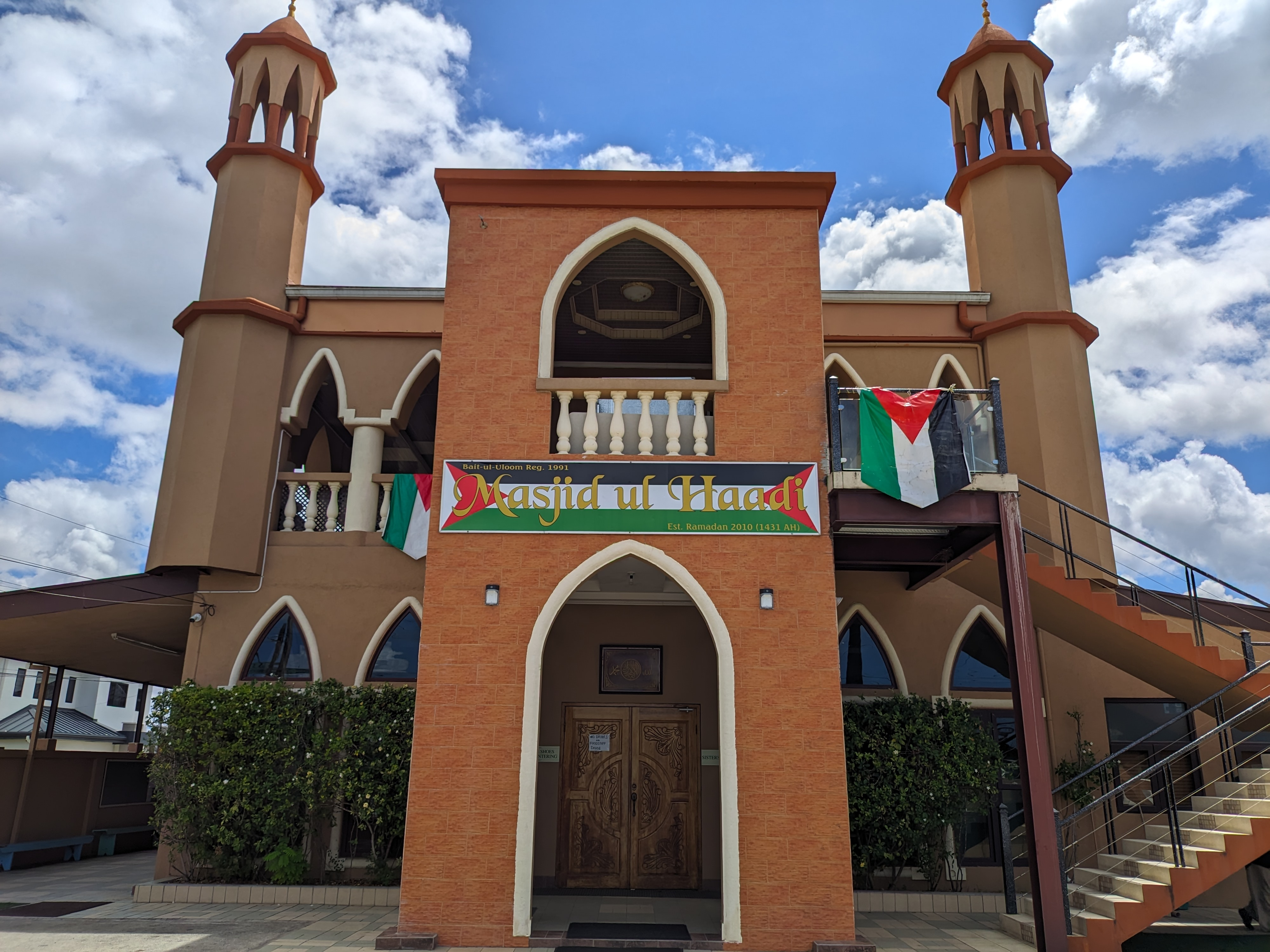
- Downtown M6 plaza Aerial view Chaguanas Hindu Mandir Divali Nagar Masjid ul Haadi

- Seal

- Location within Trinidad and Tobago Location within the Caribbean Location within North America
- Coordinates: 10°31′N 61°24′W
- Country: Trinidad and Tobago
- Jurisdiction: Borough of Chaguanas
- Settled: 1797
- Borough: 13 September 1990
- Named for: Chaguanes indigenous tribe

Government
  - Governing body: Chaguanas Borough Corporation
  - Mayor: Faaiq Mohammed (UNC)
  - Deputy Mayor: Marisa Vidya Ramlogan (UNC)
- Borough Corporation seats: 8 electoral districts
- House seats: 2/41

Area
  - Borough: 59 km^{2} (23 sq mi)
- Elevation: 48 m (157 ft)

Population (2011)
  - Borough: 83,489
  - Rank: 1st
  - Density: 1,416/km^{2} (3,670/sq mi)
  - Urban: 101,297
- Demonym: Chaguanans
- Time zone: UTC-4 (AST)
- Postal Code: 50xxxx, 52xxxx
- Area code: (868)
- ISO 3166 code: TT-CHA
- Telephone Exchanges: 665, 671, 672, 693, 829
- Website: cbc.gov.tt
- HDI The HDI for Trinidad and Tobago is 0.814, which gives the country a rank of 19th out of 177 countries with data (2007/2008) – high

The Borough of Chaguanas is the largest municipality (83,489 at the 2011 census) and fastest-growing town in Trinidad and Tobago. Located in west-central Trinidad, south of Port of Spain, north of Couva and San Fernando, and named after the indigenous tribe who originally settled there, it grew in size due to its proximity to the Woodford Lodge sugar refinery. It remained a minor town until the 1980s when it began to grow rapidly as it drew people for its bargain shopping and moderately priced housing. Its rapid growth has seen property values increase dramatically, however.

Chaguanas became a borough in 1990; prior to that, it was part of Caroni County. The current mayor is Faaiq Mohammed, and the Borough Council has historically been dominated by the United National Congress. Chaguanas has also been a hub for Indo-Trinidadian and Tobagonian culture and even the broader Indo-Caribbean culture.

In October 2026, it was announced that Chaguanas will be upgraded to a city.

== History ==
Chaguanas was named for the Chaguanes Amerindian tribe. The area was settled by the time of the British conquest of Trinidad in 1797 (see History of Trinidad and Tobago). The town originated on what was then H.E. Robinson's sugar estate adjacent to the Woodford Lodge sugar refinery and the De Verteuil coconut and cocoa estate to the north and east. In its early days the inhabitants, most of them of Indian descent, called the town to the similar sounding Indianized name Chauhan, after the Chauhan Dynasty of India from medieval times. The estate was sold over to the now defunct Caroni (1975) Ltd when sugar was the main export commodity for Trinidad and Tobago, and was part of the Woodford Lodge Estate, which is home to several buildings, including the homes of several ex-Caroni workers. Construction of the Trinidad Government Railway helped the town grow.

The Princess Margaret Highway, built by the Naval Base Trinidad military during World War II, joined the Southern Main Road at Chaguanas. Construction of the Sir Solomon Hochoy Highway extended the highway south to San Fernando. The Carlsen Air Force Base was a former United States Army Air Forces World War II airbase constructed in Carlsen Field in 1942, consisting of two landing strips, "Edinburgh" and "Xerxes". The airbase also included an emergency landing strip, "Tobago". Edinburgh Field became the principal combat base for USAAF bombers and Naval airships on Trinidad as well as Navy fighters with a complex of runways and taxiways that surpassed even Waller Field. This lasted until 3 November 1943 when, it was renamed Carlsen Field. It was also used by the Royal Air Force and was defended by US Army infantry and AA units. When the Navy began lighter-than-air operations in the Caribbean in the fall of 1943, the 80th Seabees were brought in to build a station at Carlsen Field. To supplement the eight Army-owned buildings taken over by the Navy, the 80th Battalion built a large, steel blimp hangar, a mooring circle, paved runways, a helium-purification plant, and other operational appurtenances. The facility was formally disestablished on 1950, and today the former air and naval airship base has been turned into a dairy and agricultural area south of Chaguanas and is all but unrecognisable. Much of the former airfield area is owned by National Flour Mills (NFM) and the only remnants of the base are the name of the area in south Chaguanas, along with streets named "Edinburgh" and "Xerxes".

In the later 20th century Chaguanas grew rapidly as a bazaar town. The construction of Lange Park in the early 1980s attracted a middle-class community moving south from Port of Spain and the East–West Corridor and north from San Fernando. Its central location made it attractive to southerners working in north Trinidad and northerners looking for more affordable homes. Over the years, there has been an increase in the number of Afro-Trinidadian persons joining the mostly Indo-Trinidadian community of Chaguanas, primarily through the construction of National Housing Authority (now the Housing Development Corporation) residential housing, such as Edinburgh 500. Orchard Gardens was constructed as an upper middle class community, and Lange Park (which originally and continues to have a number of civil servants) gradually gentrified.

Also, despite Couva's historical legacy within the Caroni County, as Chaguanas has evolved and expanded significantly to become the de facto administrative and commercial capital of Central Trinidad, Couva's character has now changed to become a magnet for industrialisation, sports, health, education, commercial, aviation and residential activities.

In October 1990 Chaguanas was elevated to the status of borough under the provisions of the Municipal Corporations Act, 1990.

== Geography ==
Chaguanas is low-lying and is just upstream from the Caroni Swamp. The Caparo River runs through the town. The Chaguanas Main Road runs East to West from Felicity to Longdenville. The Southern Main Road (SMR) from Busy Corner (part of which includes the Chaguanas Main Road from Busy Corner to Montrose Junction) runs south to San Fernando. The North-South Highways begins and ends at the flyover in Chaguanas, just east of the SMR West of the SMR, Perseverance Road continues south from Railway Road onto Orange Field Road.

=== Climate ===
Chaguanas has a lowland seasonal tropical climate with a wet season lasting from June to November and a dry season lasting from January to May. Unlike Port of Spain, Chaguanas has a usually hot and sweltering climate year round, with an exception for the wet season.

=== Urban structure ===
Chaguanas is bounded to the north by Munroe Road, to the east by the Gandia River, to the south by the Honda River and to the west by the Gulf of Paria.

The town is bisected by the Sir Solomon Hochoy Highway and Uriah Butler Highway.

Chaguanas consists of the following main population centres:

- Downtown Chaguanas – the original core town of Chaguanas and modern central business district; lies west of the Solomon Hochoy Highway.
- Montrose – primarily commercial district east of the Solomon Hochoy Highway.
- Edinburgh 500 and other related developments – south of Montrose.
- Edinburgh Village – south of downtown Chaguanas Area. There are two villages between downtown Chaguanas and Bagna Trace/Carlsen Field triangle roundabout on the Southern Main Rd. – Edinburgh Village and Chase Village. Boundary is defined by the Caparo River south-to-river just south of Chandernagore Rd, Chase Village continues further south to triangle and onwards. Edinburgh Village contains housing areas Edinburgh Gardens Phases 1, 2, and 3.
- Lange Park – north of Montrose and south of Endeavour, east of Orchard Gardens and the Uriah Butler Highway.
- Orchard Gardens – immediately north of the downtown and west of the Uriah Butler Highway.
- Charlieville – lies on both sides of the Uriah Butler Highway, northeast of Felicity.
- Felicity – lies further north and west of the downtown, east and south of the Caroni Swamp.
- Endeavour – northeast of Orchard Gardens, north of Lange Park.
- Enterprise – east of Endeavour and north of Longdenville
- Longdenville – east of Montrose.
- Cunupia – population centre to the northeast Chaguanas, north of Enterprise.
- Carlsen Field – a former U.S. airbase to the south of Chaguanas, this area of the town is still predominantly agricultural.
- Woodford Gardens- Community established in 2015 . This development has in excess off 700 lot and land earmarked for early childhood care Centre, primary school, secondary school and community Centre. This is located West of the former Caroni 1975 Ltd Woodford Lodge factory

== Governance ==
The Chaguanas Borough Corporation (CBC) is a local government authority and was incorporated on 13 September 1990 by Municipal Corporation Act 21 of 1990. The CBC is governed by the Act 21 of 1990 of the Republic of Trinidad and Tobago. In 2013, the Chaguanas Borough Corporation moved into its new administrative building situated in Success Street, Woodforde Lodge.

Chaguanas Borough Council has eight electoral district councillors and four aldermen selected through a proportional representation methodology. The mayor and deputy mayor are then selected. The electoral districts are: Felicity/Endeavour; Enterprise South; Edinburgh/Longdenville; Enterprise North; Charlieville; Montrose; Monroe Road/Caroni Savannah Road; and Cunupia.

Historically, the town was represented buy the Chaguanas parliamentary constituency. Today Chaguanas comprises (wholly or in part) the following parliamentary electoral districts: Chaguanas West; Chaguanas East, Couva North, Caroni Central, and Caroni East.

== Economy ==
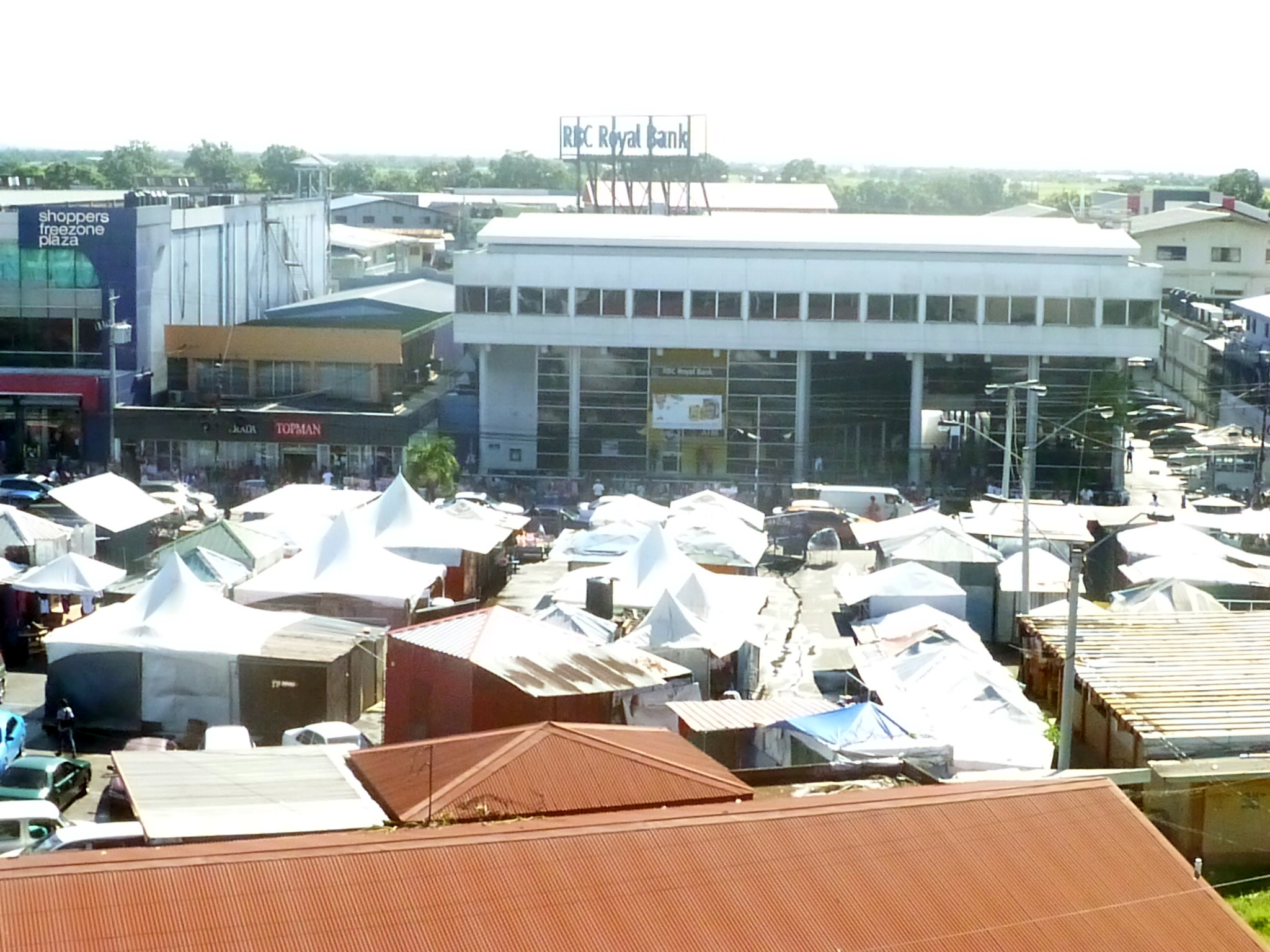
Market on Chaguanas Main Road

Chaguanas developed as a market town and still attracts bargain shoppers. Much of Chaguanas' development has centred around the Chaguanas Main Road where numerous shopping plazas have been constructed. The Chaguanas Main Road (east of the Chaguanas flyover) continued to develop, primarily through small and medium size businesses, to fulfill the expanding population centres.

Retail development expanded with the construction of three malls in the downtown in the 1980s (Centre City, Mid Centre and Ramsaran Plaza, later to become Centre Pointe Mall). Centre City Mall has been significantly renovated and there are future plans to expand further to become the largest mall in the Caribbean. It will feature two major buildings, one near to the Uriah Butler Highway and another close to the centre of Chaguanas, joined by an enclosed walkover above the Mulchan Seuchan Link Road.

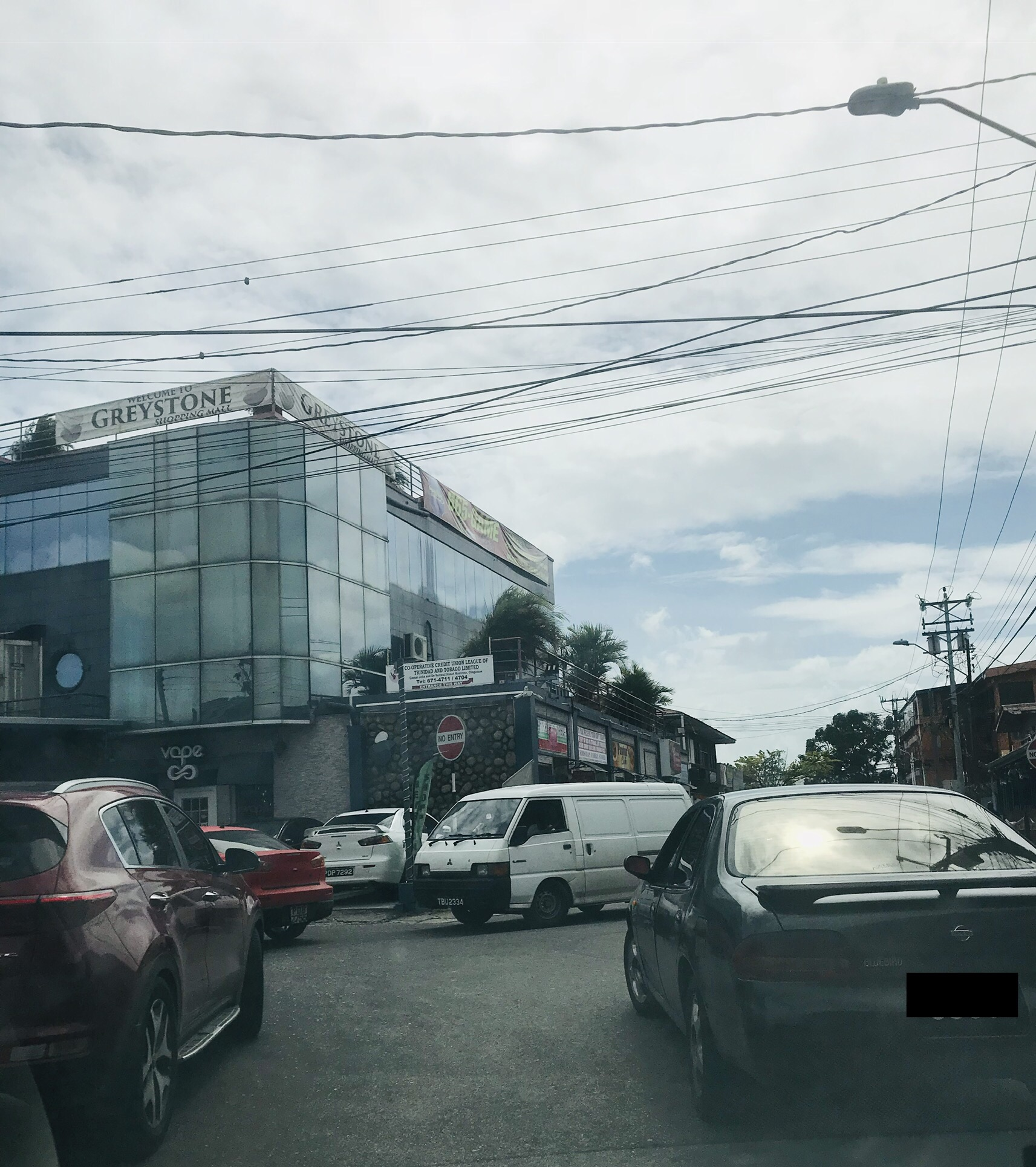
Shopping mall on De Verteuil Street

More recently, construction of Price Plaza in Endeavour expanded upscale retail opportunities. Price Plaza includes a warehouse-style stores, restaurants, a food court as well as many other retail outlets.

ABEL or Alstons Building Enterprises Limited is a member of the ANSA McAl Group of Companies and is situated in Longdenville. It is the largest manufacturer of clay building blocks and Metpro steel and aluminium windows and doors and Astralite and Spectra uPVC windows and doors in the English-speaking Caribbean.

Chaguanas has also developed into a financial centre. The Unit Trust Corporation (UTC), First Citizens Bank (FCB), Sagicor, Republic Bank of Trinidad and Tobago, Scotiabank, RBTT, and the Bank of Baroda all have major corporate offices in Chaguanas.

The dissolution of the state-owned sugar company, Caroni (1975) Limited, had a profound effect on Chaguanas, since this company was a major employer.

== Demographics ==
Chaguanas has grown rapidly from a small village to the largest borough in Trinidad and Tobago. Chaguanas has historically been considered an Indo-Trinidadian city through its original villages (such as Edinburgh village, Felicity, Charlieville, Chandernagore, Chase Village, St. Thomas, Montrose, and Endeavour), but as it has grown it has become more multi-racial. Enterprise is a historically Afro-Trinidadian village that has been absorbed into the growing city of Chaguanas. Also, Edinburgh 500 and other associated governmental housing developments are also largely Afro-Trinidadian.

Historical population
Year	Pop.	±%
1980	6,177	—
1988	8,000	+29.5%
2000	61,897	+673.7%
2011	83,489	+34.9%

=== Race ===
Borough of Chaguanas racial breakdown
Racial composition	2011
Indian	53.5%
African	25.3%
Multiracial	9.3%
Dougla (Indian and African)	7.03%
European	0.1%
Chinese	0.2%
Native American (Amerindian)	0.06%
Arab (Syrian/Lebanese)	0.02%
Other	0.15%
Not stated	4%

=== Religion ===
Religion in Chaguanas (2011 census)
Religion	Percent
Christianity	46.7%
Hinduism	32.7%
Islam	9.4%
Other	9.4%
None/not shared	1.7%

== Culture and entertainment ==
=== Scenery/attractions ===
The Lion House also known as Anand Bhavan, is the ancestral home of the Capildeo family and is the birthplace of Nobel Prize–winning author V.S. Naipaul is located in Chaguanas. This is generally assumed to be the model for Hanuman House in Naipaul's A House for Mr Biswas, with Chaguanas as the model for Arwacas.

The Caroni Swamp, the largest mangrove wetland in Trinidad and Tobago, is located just north and west of the town. The swamp is a popular tourist attraction and roosting ground for the scarlet ibis, national bird of Trinidad and Tobago.

The Divali Nagar site, located in northern Chaguanas, is a major attraction in the period just before Diwali. The village of Felicity, on the western end of Chaguanas, is famous for its elaborate Diwali celebrations.

=== Media ===
The Trinidad Publishing Company (TTSE: TPCL), the country's oldest and most established publisher of the Trinidad Guardian newspaper, constructed its printing facility for the Newspaper division of Trinidad Publishing Company Limited, of the ANSA McAL Group's Media Sector, in the vicinity of Chaguanas flyover.

HCU Communications Limited (now defunct) was based in Chaguanas. It operated a radio station (Win Radio 101.1 FM), was home of television station (WIN TV) From early 2007, it also published three weekly newspapers, The Probe, Uhuru and Bollywood Today.

=== Entertainment ===
The town includes numerous malls (such as Price Plaza, Xtra Plaza, Mid Centre Mall & Centre Pointe Mall) and associated restaurants and bars. Also, a number of areas in Chaguanas are now quickly developing into entertainment areas, such as Rodney Road, Endeavour with The Rise, Law 5, Double R, and others.

== Infrastructure ==
=== Health ===
The Chaguanas District Hospital is located in Montrose Chaguanas (along the Southern Main Road). Inclusive of the district health facility, a private hospital (Medical Associates) situated in the vicinity of the Chaguanas flyover was opened in 2012. Other small privately run health facilities are located throughout Chaguanas and its environs.

The Caroni County Medical Officers of Health (CMOH), of which Chaguanas falls under, is situated on the Southern Main Road in Couva. The CMOH are responsible for insect-vector control and septic leakage complaints.

=== Education ===
The Borough is host to many prominent primary and secondary schools. Notable primary schools include Montrose Vedic in Downtown Chaguanas, and Montrose Government in Lange Park.

The Presentation College, Chaguanas is a Roman Catholic secondary school in Chaguanas and is the brother school of Presentation College, San Fernando. It was regarded as one of the best performing high school in Trinidad and Tobago throughout its history, and in particular within its recent history being awarded the country's President's medal for best performing student multiple times (5 times in a row).

The University of the West Indies (UWI) Esmond D Ramesar Open Campus will be constructed along the Narsaloo Ramaya Road in Chaguanas.

=== Transport ===
Chaguanas is an important transportation hub. Buses, taxis and maxi-taxis connect Chaguanas with Port of Spain, San Fernando, Curepe and Couva, and smaller settlements around central Trinidad.

Given the town's origin as a village and its generally unplanned rapid growth into the country's largest town (by population), Chaguanas is continuously plagued by traffic problems despite numerous attempts of alternative traffic management schemes. This traffic congestion is now considered as a threat to future growth of the Borough.

=== Sports ===
The main sporting venue in Chaguanas is the Central Regional Indoor Sport Arena Hall at Saith Park. Smaller recreation grounds (e.g. Woodforde Lodge, Avinash Samaroo ground) and cricket pitches (Pierre Road) are scattered throughout the borough, but no larger sporting venues are located within the town. The town leverages the infrastructure from other towns such as Couva's Ato Boldon Stadium or Sevilla golf course, also located in Couva.

=== Utilities ===
Electric generation is handled by Powergen, while electrical distribution is handled by the Trinidad and Tobago Electricity Commission (T&TEC). Chaguanas does not contain its own power generation facilities.

Water and sewerage are under the purview of the Water and Sewerage Authority of Trinidad and Tobago (WASA).

The town is served by all major telecommunication (including cable, satellite) companies, e.g. TSTT, Flow, DirecTV, Digicel+ and Greendot.

== Notable persons ==
- Erphaan Alves, Soca Musician
- Marlon Asher, Musician
- Adrian Barath, Cricketer
- Damion Barry, Athlete
- Capildeo family
  - Pundit Capildeo
  - Rudranath Capildeo, Politician, mathematician & Barrister
  - Simbhoonath Capildeo, Lawyer, Politician, Founding member of the DLP
- Akeem García, Football coach and player
- Asa Guevara, Athlete
- Kevin Jared Hosein, Writer
- Satnarayan Maharaj, Politician
- Sparkle McKnight, Athlete
- Vandana Mohit, mayor and MP
- Ahkeela Mollon, Footballer
- Seepersad Naipaul, Writer
- V. S. Naipaul, Writer, Nobel Laureate
- Shiva Naipaul, Writer, Journalist
- Nigel Paul, Boxer
- Suruj Ragoonath, Cricketer
- Dinanath Ramnarine, Cricketer
- Ria Ramnarine, Boxer
- Reyare Thomas, Athlete
- Scott Sealy, Footballer
- Patrice Superville, Footballer

== Sister city ==
- Lauderhill, Florida, United States of America
