= List of dams and reservoirs in Trinidad and Tobago =

Trinidad and Tobago has a number of dams and reservoirs. Reservoirs were constructed to supply potable water and are managed by the Water and Sewerage Authority of Trinidad and Tobago (WASA).

== In Trinidad ==
=== Navet Dam ===
The Navet Dam is one of the major reservoirs supplying potable water in Trinidad and Tobago. The dam was completed in 1962 and expanded in 1966 and 1976. It supplies Tabaquite, Brasso, Williamsville, Gasparillo, San Fernando, Debe, Penal, Princes Town, Rio Claro, South Oropouche, La Brea Moruga, New Grant, Plaisance Park, La Romaine and Fyzabad.

The Navet Dam covers an area of 3.24 km^{2} (800 acres) and has a capacity of 18,200,000m^{3} (4,000 million imperial gallons). It supplies 86.4 m^{3} per day.

=== Caroni–Arena Dam ===
The Caroni–Arena Dam is the largest dam in Trinidad and Tobago. It is located in the Arena Forest Reserve, south of Arima, in the eastern Caroni Plains. WASA supplies water to areas of central Trinidad by purifying the water from the dam. It was opened in the late 1970s/early 1980s.

=== Hollis Reservoir ===
Hollis Reservoir is a reservoir located in north Trinidad supplying Arima, Port of Spain and other areas of north Trinidad. It is also a popular tourist attraction. Located about three miles off the Valencia Road, the Hollis Dam is the oldest dam in Trinidad and Tobago. It was built between 1934 and 1936, under the reign of Sir Claud Hollis, who governed Trinidad and Tobago from 1930 to 1936. This man-made lake is fed from the waters of the Quare River and rainfall from the surrounding mountains. When full it can supply 8.2 million gallons of water to people in Arima, Nettoville, Cleaver Road, Bregan Park, D'Abadie and Arouca. With the dry season, the supply is cut in half. The Hollis catchment also supports a variety of animal life such as lappe, tattoo, howler monkeys, deer, wild hogs, caiman, tilapia and snakes. Hunting and fishing are not permitted near the dam. Visitors are allowed to picnic, courtesy of the Water and Sewerage Authority of Trinidad and Tobago. Foreign visitors and locals regularly hike from the dam into the surrounding mountains to experience the spectacular wildlife that the dam, and its surrounding area, have to offer. There are 90 species of birds that call Hollis their home, some permanent, and some migrating for the winter. Visitors and personnel are not permitted to swim at the dam.

== In Tobago ==
=== Hillsborough Reservoir ===
The Hillsborough Reservoir is the major source of drinking water for the island of Tobago. Located 36.5 metres (100 ft) above sea level, the reservoir is managed by Water and Sewerage Authority of Trinidad and Tobago. It has a capacity of about 1 million m^{3} (225 million gallons).

Construction began in 1944 and the facility was commissioned in 1952 by Governor Sir Hubert Rance.
