= Tabaquite =

Coordinates: 10°23′25″N 61°18′5″W

Tabaquite is a town in central Trinidad, north of Rio Claro and west of the Navet Dam.

Miss Trinidad and Tobago 2015 Kimberly Singh hails from Tabaquite. Tabaquite is a primarily rural area and suffers from infrastructural neglect. It was an important cocoa bean producer. Now it is one of the major vegetable producers on the island. Producing vegetables such as cassava, melongene, cucumber, a variety of peppers, tomatoes, celery, chive, pumpkin, ochro, and Canadian sweet corn. Many families produce these vegetables and sell them at the various wholesale markets.

Tabaquite is administered by the Couva–Tabaquite–Talparo Regional Corporation.

Tabaquite was served for a time by a station on the Trinidad Government Railway. It has the longest tunnel in the Caribbean measuring approximately 660 feet, The Knollys Tunnel, which was named after the then-acting Colonial Governor of Trinidad and Tobago, Sir Clement Courtenay Knollys KCMG, who officially opened the new railway tunnel on 20 August 1898.
