= Point Lisas =

Coordinates: 10°23′28″N 61°28′28″W

- Neighbourhood
- Interactive map of Point Lisas
- Country: Trinidad and Tobago
- Region: Couva–Tabaquite–Talparo
- Town: Couva
- Time zone: UTC-4 (AST)

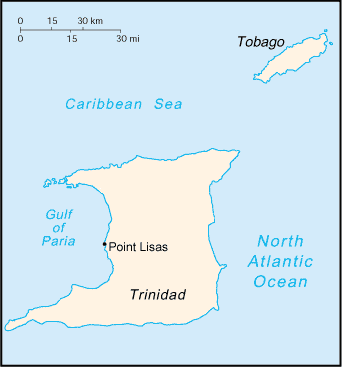
Location of Point Lisas in Trinidad and Tobago.

Point Lisas is a major industrial centre in Trinidad and Tobago and is host to the Point Lisas Industrial Estate and the Port of Point Lisas, both of which are managed by Plipdeco (the Point Lisas Industrial Port Development Company). Point Lisas is located in Couva, Trinidad and Tobago on the Gulf of Paria coastline.

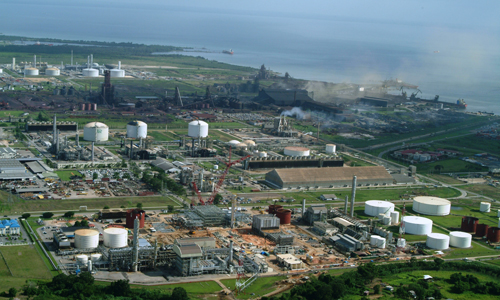
Point Lisas from above

The Point Lisas Industrial Estate is home to a majority of the heavy industry in Trinidad and Tobago particularly in the downstream energy sector. Industries located there include a steel mill (owned by ArcelorMittal); numerous ammonia plants and methanol plants, melamine manufacturing plants, a urea manufacturing plant; a natural gas to liquids processing facility and it is the site of two power stations and a large reverse osmosis water desalination plant. Most of the industry located at Point Lisas is dependent on natural gas which is produced off the east coast of Trinidad and transported by pipeline across the island.

ArcelorMittal Point Lisas is the largest steelmaker in the Caribbean and the largest non-oil industrial complex in Trinidad and Tobago. It is a fully integrated mini-mill, using internally produced high-quality direct reduced iron (DRI) to manufacture billets and a wide range of medium to high quality grades of wire rods. ArcelorMittal Point Lisas uses approximately 90 per cent DRI and 10 per cent scrap as its metallic input.

The Port of Point Lisas is the second largest port in the country and is a major cargo port. It also serves the heavy industry located in the area. Point Lisas is administered by the Couva–Tabaquite–Talparo Regional Corporation.

== Industries/Companies ==
- Arcelor Mittal - 550,000tons/annum hot-briquetted iron plant
- PotashCorp 2.2 million tonnes/annum ammonia from three plants and 0.7 million tonnes/annum urea from one plant
- Yara International1.3 million tonnes/annum ammonia from three plants
- Methanex
- Air Liquide - Air Separation and methane reformer
- Methanol Holdings Trinidad and Tobago Limited
- Powergen, Pt Lisas 852MW Generation Facility This facility is 39% owned by Marubeni of Japan though a wholly owned subsidiary
- Trinity Power 225MW Generation Facility
- Desalcott 40 Million Gallon per day RO Desalination Plant
- Massy Energy
- Proman Trinidad
