= List of Hindu temples in Trinidad and Tobago =

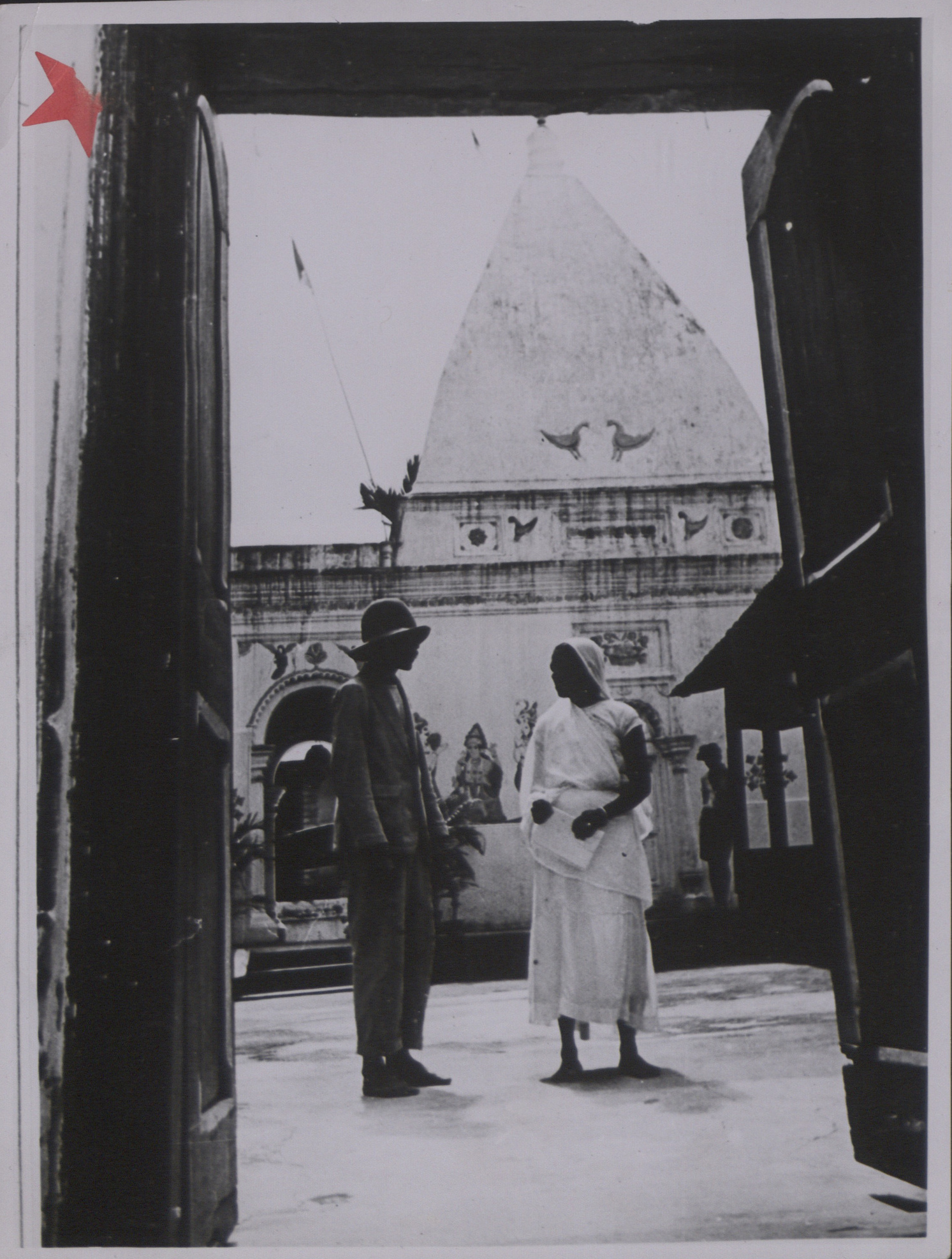
Mandir near Eastern Main Road, Tunapuna, 1945

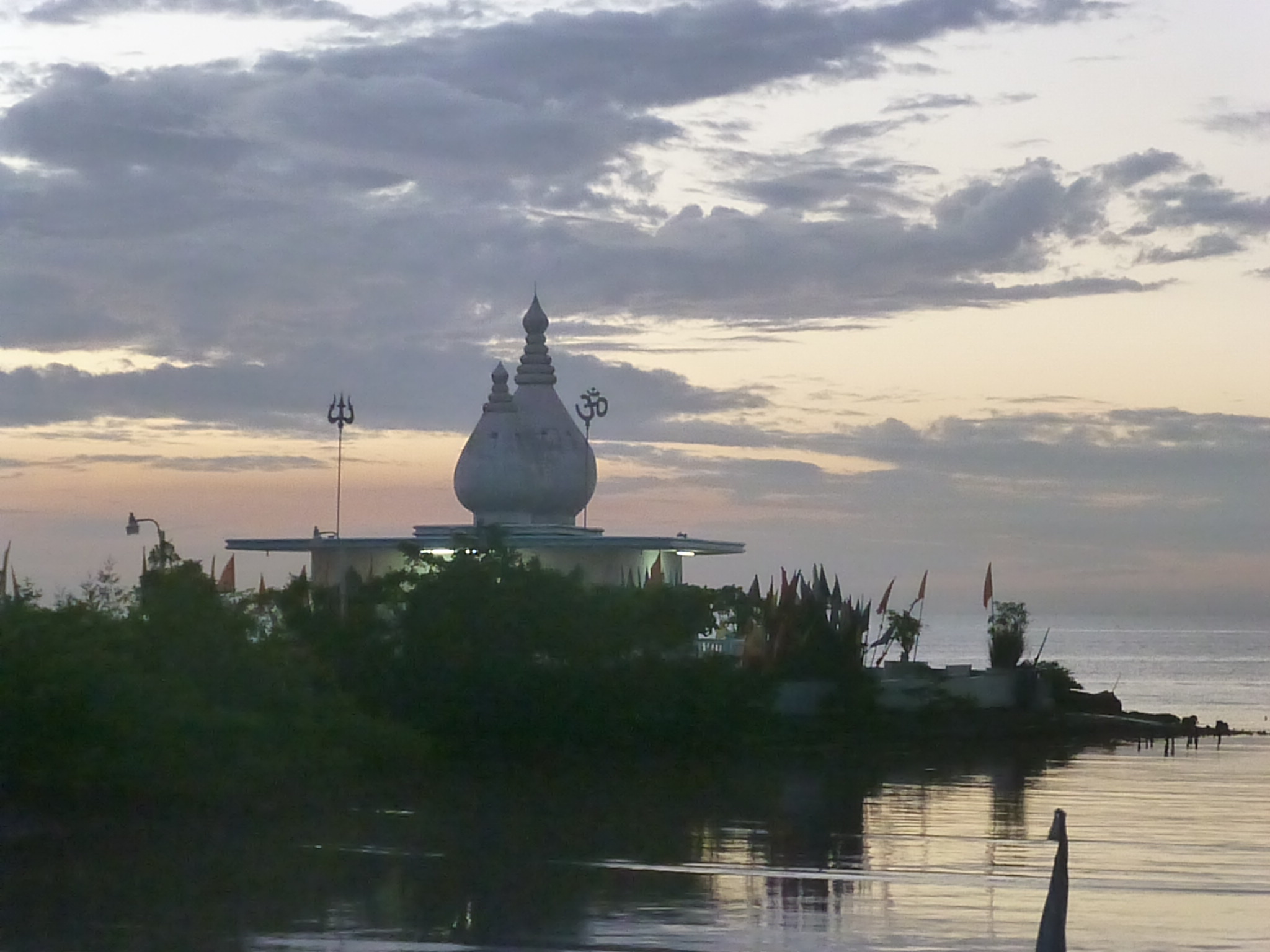
Temple in the Sea, Waterloo, Couva–Tabaquite–Talparo, Trinidad and Tobago.

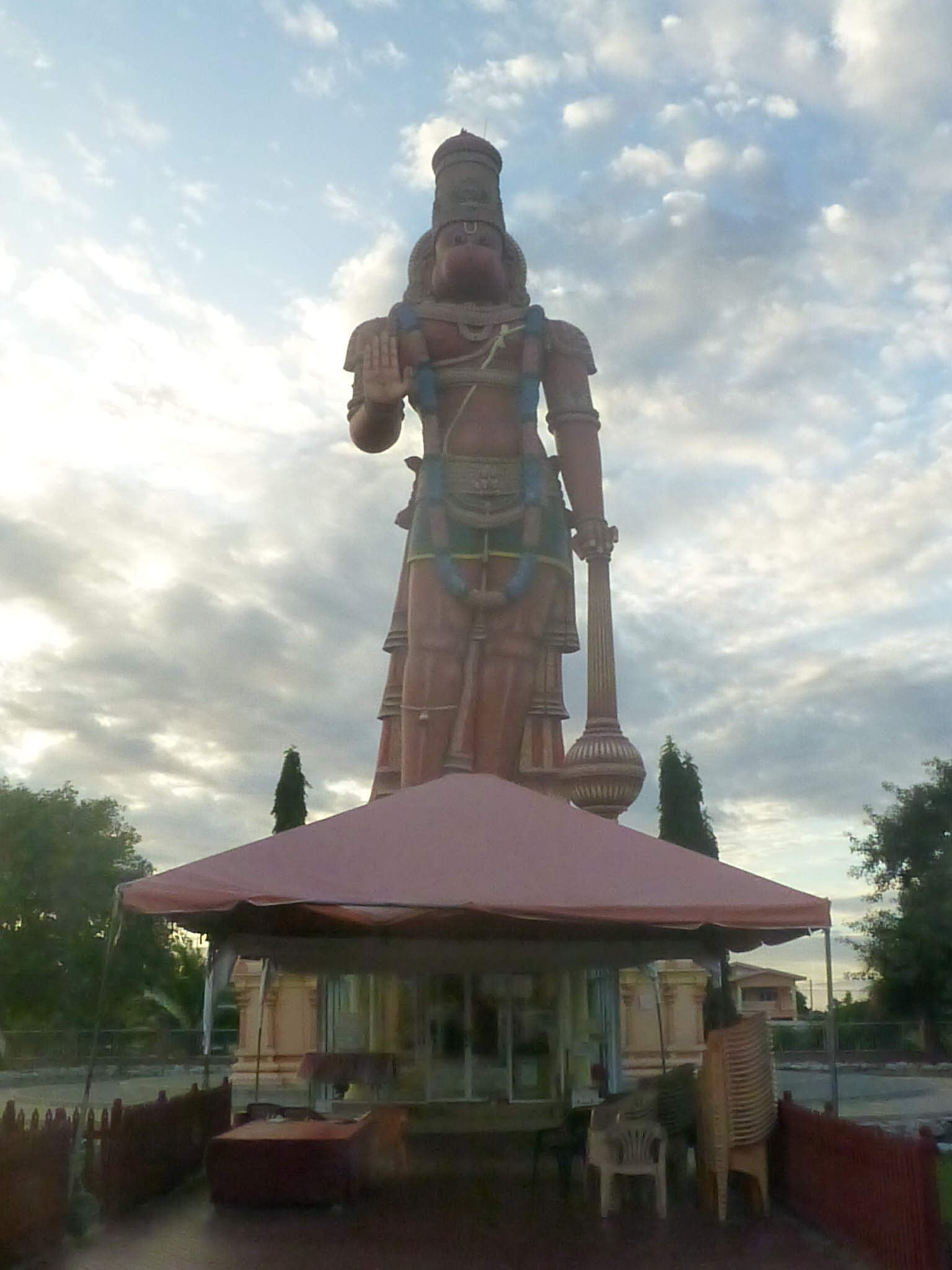
Karyasiddhi Hanuman statue at the Dattatreya Mandir in Orange Field Village, Carapichaima, Caroni County, Couva–Tabaquite–Talparo, Trinidad and Tobago

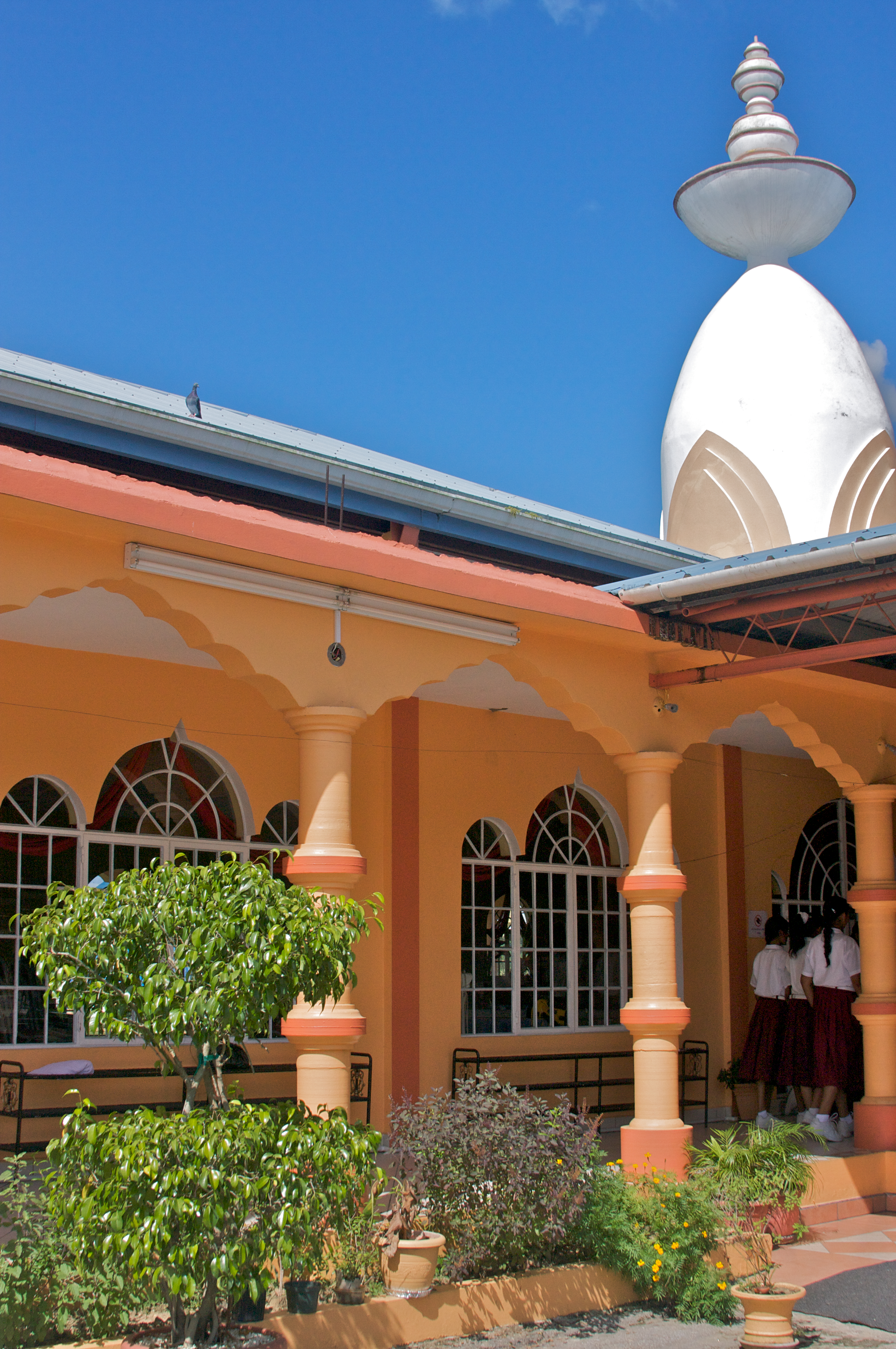
Saruswati Mandir

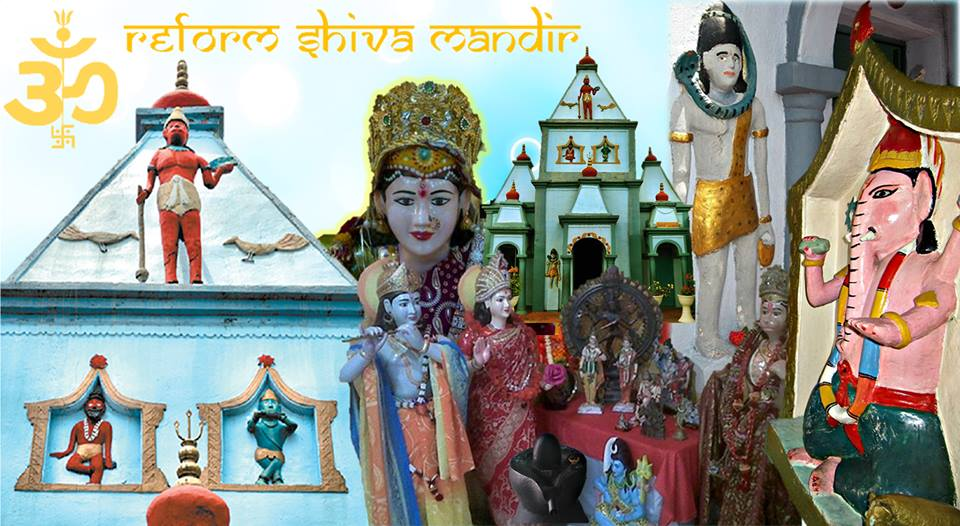
Reform Village Shiva Mandir at Railway Road, Reform Village, Gasparillo, San Fernando, Victoria County, Trinidad and Tobago

This is a List of Hindu temples in Trinidad and Tobago.

== Temples ==
- Aum Shanti Ashram - Ackwah Road, Cunjal Road
- Bamboo #2 Shiv Mandir - Bamboo Main Road, Bamboo Grove Settlement No. 2
- Barrackpore United Hindu Sabha - Congo Hill Road, Barrackpore
- Bharatiya Vidya Sansthhaan - Adesh Ashram, Oudai Street, Aranguez
- Bonne Aventure Hindu Temple - Parforce Street, Gasparillo
- Brickfield Shiv Mandir - Brickfield Village, Waterloo Road, Carapichaima
- Bronte Hindu Mandir - Sugar Road, Bronte Village. Princes Town
- Cap-De-Ville Hindu Temple - 19 Ramdhanie Street, Cap-De-Ville, Point Fortin
- Carapo Shiv Mandir - O'Meara Road, Carapo
- Chaguanas Hindu Temple - Corner Cumberbatch Street & Chaguanas Main Road, Chaguanas
- Chandrashekhar Vishnu Mandir - Naparima Mayaro Road, Rio Claro
- Charlieville Shiv Mandir - Caroni Savannah Road, Charlieville, Chaguanas
- Chinmaya Ashram - #1 Swami Chinmayananda Drive, Calcutta Road #1, Mc Bean, Couva
- Churkoo Village Mandir - 153 Manahambre Road, Churkoo Village
- Couva Mandir - Corner Cumberland and Balisier Streets, Couva
- Craignish Shiva Mandir - Naparima Mayaro Road, Princes Town
- Dharma Prakash Sabha Vyas Hindu Complex & Devi Mandir - 122 Caroni Savannah Road, Charlieville, Chaguanas
- Divya Jeewan Hindu Mandir - Sou Sou Lands, Penal
- Doon Pundit Shiv Mandir - Temple Street, Arima
- Esperanza Shiv Mandir - Esperanza Village, California
- Golconda Shiv Mandir
- Hanuman Milan Mandir - Penal Rock Road, Sadhoowa
- Hindu Vision Society - 54 Ariapita Avenue, Woodbrook
- Hindu Youth Organization - PO Box 3508, La Romain Post Office, La Romain
- ISKCON South Centre - Orion Drive, Debe []
- ISKCON Sri Sri Nitai Gauranga Mandir - Eastern Main Road, Garden Village, Arouca
- ISKCON Sri Sri Radha Gopinath Mandir - Edinburgh Rd, Longdenville
- Kabir Chowra Math - Mulchan Trace, Penal Rock Road
- Kailash Hindu Mandir - Eastern Main Road, Sangre Chiquito
- Kailash Mandir - 10b Gonzales Circular Road, Temple Street, Belmont
- Kasheenath Mandir - Siparia Old Road, Fyzabad
- Krishna Rama Mandir - #515 Guaracara Road, Williamsville
- Lachoos Road Shiv Mandir - #294 Lachoos Road, Penal
- La Gloria Radha Krishna Mandir - La Gloria Settlement, New Grant
- Lakshmi Narayan Bhakti Mandali - Corner Churchill Roosevelt Highway and Pasea Extension, Tunapuna
- Lakshmi Narayan Mandir - LP 112 Siewdass Road, Freeport, Chaguanas
- Lakshmi Narayana Pranava Mandir - Beaucarro
- Maha Rani Bhawani Maa Shakti Mandir - Pentecostal Street, Tunapuna
- Malick Temple - San Juan
- McBean Hindu Mandir - Southern Main Road, Couva
- Munroe Road Hindu Temple - Munroe Road, Munroe Settlement, Chaguanas
- Naag Devta Shakti Shrine - Boundary Road Extension, Aranguez, San Juan
- Navet Shiva Mandir - #468 Cunapo Southern Main Road, Navet Village, Rio Claro
- Palmiste Hindu Temple - Thompson Road, Palmiste, Chaguanas
- Pandit Parasram School of Hinduism
- Panduranga Vitthala Mandir - Seemungal Branch Trace, Mulchan Road, Penal Rock Road, Penal
- Param Dhaama Aashrama - Lachoos Road, Penal
- Patiram Trace Shiva Lingam Mandir - Patiram Trace, Penal
- Penal Rock Hindu Organization - 3¾ Mile Mark, Penal Rock Road, Penal
- Petite Morne Krishna Mandir - Petite Morne Settlement, Ste. Madeliene
- Pierre Road Maha Milan Mandir - Corner of Pierre Road & Connector Road, Charlieville, Chaguanas
- Plaisance Park Hindu Temple - Petra Avenue, Plaisance Park
- Point Fortin Durga Shakti Mandir Durga Shakti Temple - Dam Road, Point Fortin
- Point Fortin Hindu Mandir - Guapo Cap-De-Ville Road, Point Fortin
- Radha Krishna Mandir - Gandhi Village, Debe
- Rama Krishna Mandir - #257 Mohess Road, Debe
- Rama Krishna Mandir - Clarke Road, Penal
- Reform Village Hindu Temple - Guaracara Tabaquite Rd, Gasparillo
- Sadhu Shakti Satsangh Mandir - Lawrence Hill, Digity Village, Barrackpore
- Sant Nagar Hindu Temple - Corner of Ramoutar Street and Ojoe Road, Sangre Grande
- Santa Flora Shiva Mandir - Pioneer Avenue, Santa Flora
- Satya Drishti Spiritual & Sporting Group - Rookmineah Trace South, Barrackpore
- Scott's/Mendez Shiv Mandir - Scott's Road, Penal
- SEVA - 18 Fletcher Road, Todds Road, Flanagin Town
- Shiv Durga Shakti Mandir - Korea Village, Carapichaima
- Shiv Dvadas Jyortirling Mandir - Lower McBean, Couva
- Shiv Shakti Temple - Neranthar Trace off Grant Trace, Rousillac
- Shiva Harijan Mandir - 31-35 Lalbeharry Trace, Debe
- Shiva Jyoti Hindu Organization Trinidad and Tobago Incorporated - Las Lomas #1
- Shree Divya Jyoti Mandir (The Mount Lambert Hindu Temple) - #13 Circular Road, Temple Street, Mount Lambert, San Juan
- Shree Pavan Putra Hanuman Shiv Shakti Mandir - 20 Cunjal Road, Barrackpore
- Shree Raam Mandir Ayodhya Dhaam (formerly Endeavour Hindu Temple) - Rodney Road, Endeavour Village, Chaguanas
- Shree Shankar Mandir - #139 Cacandee Road, Felicity, Chaguanas
- Shri Bandi Hanuman Mandir - St.Mary’s Village, Moruga
- Shri Murugan Foundation - Alta Garcia Trace, San Francique, Penal
- Skanda Mata Shakti Kovil - #54b Duff Trace South, Lower Barrackpore
- Spring Village Mandir - Couva Main Road, Balmain, Couva
- Sri Dattatreya Yoga Centre (Trinidad and Tobago) - Datta Drive, Orange Field Road, Carapichaima
- Sri Devi Maha Kaali Mandir - Joseph Cooper Trace, St Julien Village, Moruga
- Sri Govinda Maha Kali Mandir - Temple Road off Streatham Lodge Road, St. Augustine
- Sri Kali Amman Kovel- #9 Thomas Trace, Arouca
- Sri Mariamman Kali Koilou - #17 Golconda Settlement, Cross Crossing, San Fernando
- Sri Sachchidananda Yoga Ashrama - 8A Rochard Road, Penal
- Sri Siddhi Vinayaak Mandir SDMS Branch No. 221 - Siparia Old Road, Avocat
- Sri Sri Gopaul Krishna Ashram - Nolan Street, Felicity
- Suchit Trace Ganesh Mandir - Suchit Trace, Penal
- Swaha Dharma Jyot Mandali - Naranjit Trace, Mondesir, South Oropouche
- Swaha Divya Ashram - 5a Mowlah Road, Preysal, Couva
- Swaha Gyaan Deepak Kirtan Mandali - 19 Chotoo Street, Aranguez
- Swaha Gyaan Jyoti Mandali- Wall Street, Madras Settlement
- Swaha Kashie Vishwanath Mandir - 1 km Penal Rock Road, Penal
- Swaha Longdenville Temple - Amaroosingh Street, Longdenville
- Swaha Om Shakti Mandali - Corner Coronation & Park Streets, Aranguez
- Swaha Shiv Shankar Mandir - Constance Street, Montrose, Chaguanas
- Swaha Sri Raam Dhaam - 92 Upper St. Lucien Road, Diego Martin
- Swaha Sukh Shanti Bhakti Mandali - Warner Street, Freeman Road, St. Augustine
- Swaha Tulsi Manas Mandir - ¾ Mile Mark, Cunapo Southern Main Road, Sangre Grande
- Temple in the Sea - Waterloo, Couva
- Trinidad Sevashram Sangha - 32, Nolan Street, Felicity, Chaguanas
- Triveni Mandir - Sisters Road, Hardbargain
- Upper Esmeralda Road Shiva Mandir - Esmeralda Road, Cunupia
- Vishwanath Cultural Centre - #40 Cacandee Road, Felicity
- Vishwanath Hindu Social and Cultural Organization - 30¾ Mile Mark, Eastern Main Road, Sangre Chiquito
- Penal Hindu Mandir- S.S. Erin Road, Penal

== See also ==
- Lists of Hindu temples
