= City Gate (Port of Spain) =

General information
- Location: South Quay, Port of Spain, Trinidad
- Current tenants: Public Transport Service Corporation; Maxi taxi
- Owner: City of Port of Spain

City Gate is the main terminal for the buses and maxi taxis in Port of Spain, Trinidad and Tobago. It is located in the former Trinidad Government Railway terminal on South Quay. It was slated to serve as the terminal for the proposed rapid rail system. The City Gate terminal is a historical landmark. It was responsible for connecting Port of Spain to the rest of the island via railway. The building itself displays authentic European architecture. Today, it serves as a bus terminal and is a major destination for commuters from all over the nation.

== See also ==
- Public Transport Service Corporation
- Transport in Trinidad and Tobago
