= South Trunk Road =

Road in Trinidad and Tobago

Route information
- Length: 13.5 km (8.4 mi)

Major junctions
- North end: San Fernando
- South end: Mon Desir

Location
- Country: Trinidad and Tobago
- Major cities: San Fernando

Highway system
- Transport in Trinidad and Tobago

The South Trunk Road is a major arterial road on the island of Trinidad, in Trinidad and Tobago. It runs for 13.5 km (8.4 mi).

It connects the San Fernando Bypass at the Cipero Street interchange to the Sir Solomon Hochoy Highway at Mon Desir, bisecting the communities along the southern outskirts of San Fernando.

Much of the road's route was initially signed as the Southern Main Road, but the entire route was eventually widened to a four-lane dual carriageway and eventually extended south to meet the extended Sir Solomon Hochoy Highway.

== Description ==
=== Route ===
The road runs generally north-south. At its northern end, it joins the San Fernando Bypass heading north to Marabella. It connects to the Golconda Connector Road, S.S. Erin Road and Cipero Street at its northern end via an interchange. The road runs south past commercial areas before meeting the Gulf View Link Road and the Gulf City Mall. It then runs towards Dumfries Road, dividing the Gulf City Mall compound and Gulf View with the commercial and industrial areas on the southern side. It meets Dumfries Road and runs towards Bel Air and La Bel Air, meeting Alice Street at a traffic light, and then meeting PriceSmart/Lucky Street. The Potato Trace light provides access to industrial areas on the northern side. At Paria Suites, the Southern Main Road joins and the road runs alongside the South Oropouche Swamp, on the edge of the mangrove alongside the coastline. This section of roadway has been raised to prevent flooding, but is currently a two-lane road as the outer carriageway remains incomplete. The road bridges over the Godineau River at Mosquito Creek, past the Shore of Peace cremation site. At the St. Mary's interchange, the Southern Main Road runs westward into Rousillac, and the South Trunk Road runs south eventually meeting the Sir Solomon Hochoy Highway at Mon Desir.

=== Features ===
For its entire route excluding parts Mosquito Creek, the road is a four-lane dual carriageway. The speed limit on most of the route is 80 km/h.

Between Mosquito Creek roundabout and the Sir Solomon Hochoy Highway, the road is grade-separated.

=== Exit list ===
The following table lists the major junctions along the South Trunk Road. The entire route is located in Trinidad.

Region	Location	Km	Mile	Exit	Destinations	Notes
San Fernando		0	0.0	—	San Fernando By-Pass – San Fernando – San Fernando General Hospital	Northern terminus; Continuation from the San Fernando By-Pass.
San Fernando		1.1	0.68	1	Gulf View Link Road; Fahey Street	
San Fernando		1.9	1.2	2	Dumfries Road	Access via Roundabout
San Fernando		2.3	1.4	3	La Bel Air Road	
San Fernando		2.9	1.8	4	Alice Street	
San Fernando		3.4	2.1	5	Lucky Street; PriceSmart	
San Fernando		3.8	2.4	6	Potato Trace	
Penal–Debe	San Fernando	4.7	2.9	7	Southern Main Road; M2 Ring Road	Northern end of Southern Main Road concurrency
Siparia	South Oropouche	8.4	5.2	8	Mosquito Creek	Access via Roundabout
Siparia	South Oropouche	9	5.6	9	Belle Vue Gardens	
Siparia	South Oropouche	9.9	6.2	10	Southern Main Road; Oropouche Road	Southern end of Southern Main Road concurrency
Siparia	Mon Desir	13.5	8.4	11	Sir Solomon Hochoy Highway – Siparia, Point Fortin	Southern terminus
1.000 mi = 1.609 km; 1.000 km = 0.621 mi: Closed/former; Concurrency terminus; Incomplete access; Tolled; Route transition; Unopened
