= Diego Martin (disambiguation) =

Diego Martin is a town and urban commercial center in Trinidad and Tobago

Diego Martin may also refer to:

- Diego Martin (region), a Region of Trinidad and Tobago
- Diego Martin Highway, a highway in Trinidad and Tobago
- Diego Martín (actor) (born 1974), Spanish actor
- Diego Martín (Chilean footballer) (born 1999), Chilean football defender
- Diego Martín (Spanish footballer) (born 2003), Spanish football left-back

== See also ==
- Diego Martins (disambiguation)
