= Transport in Trinidad and Tobago =

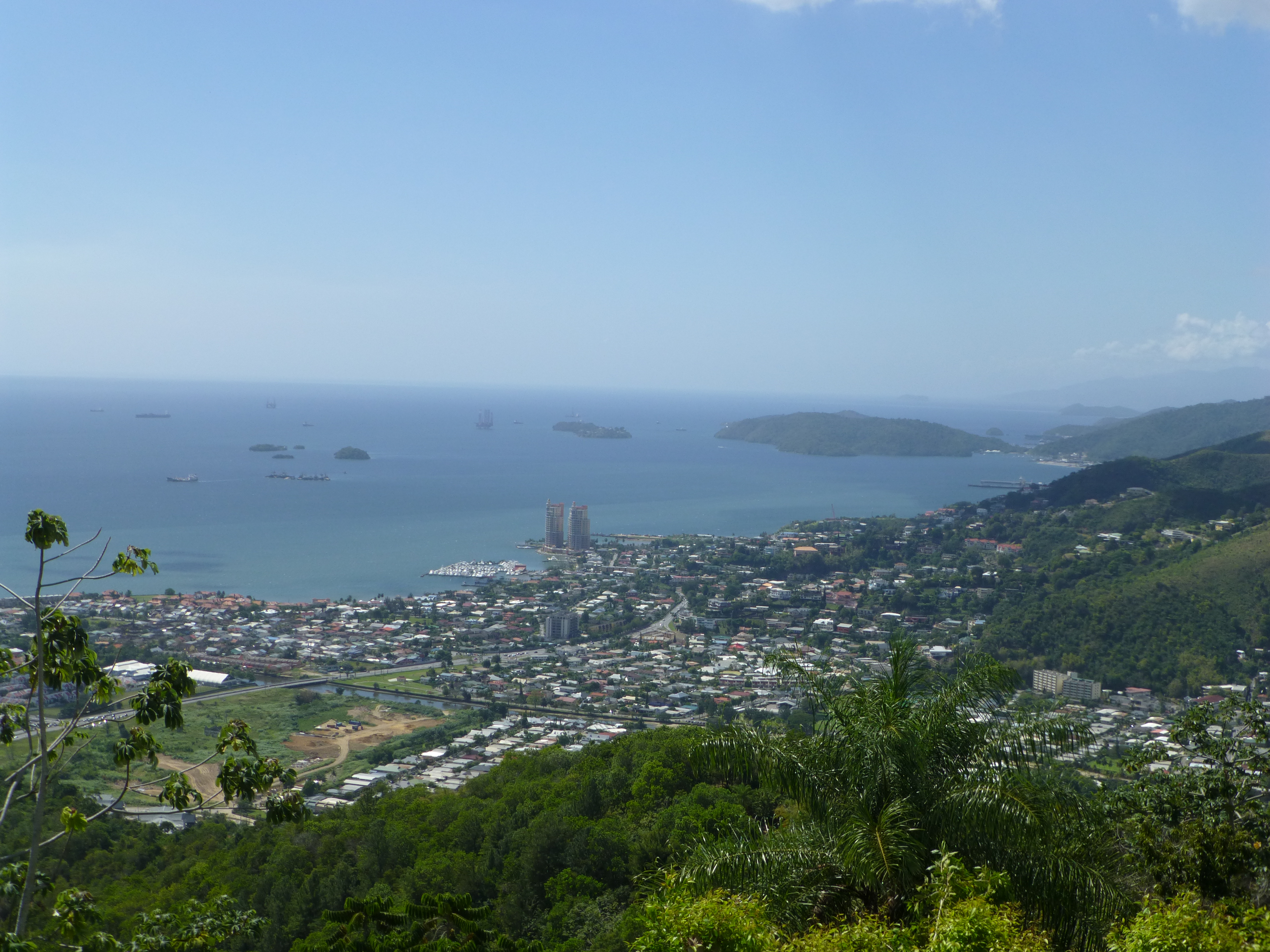
Western main road cuts through several towns

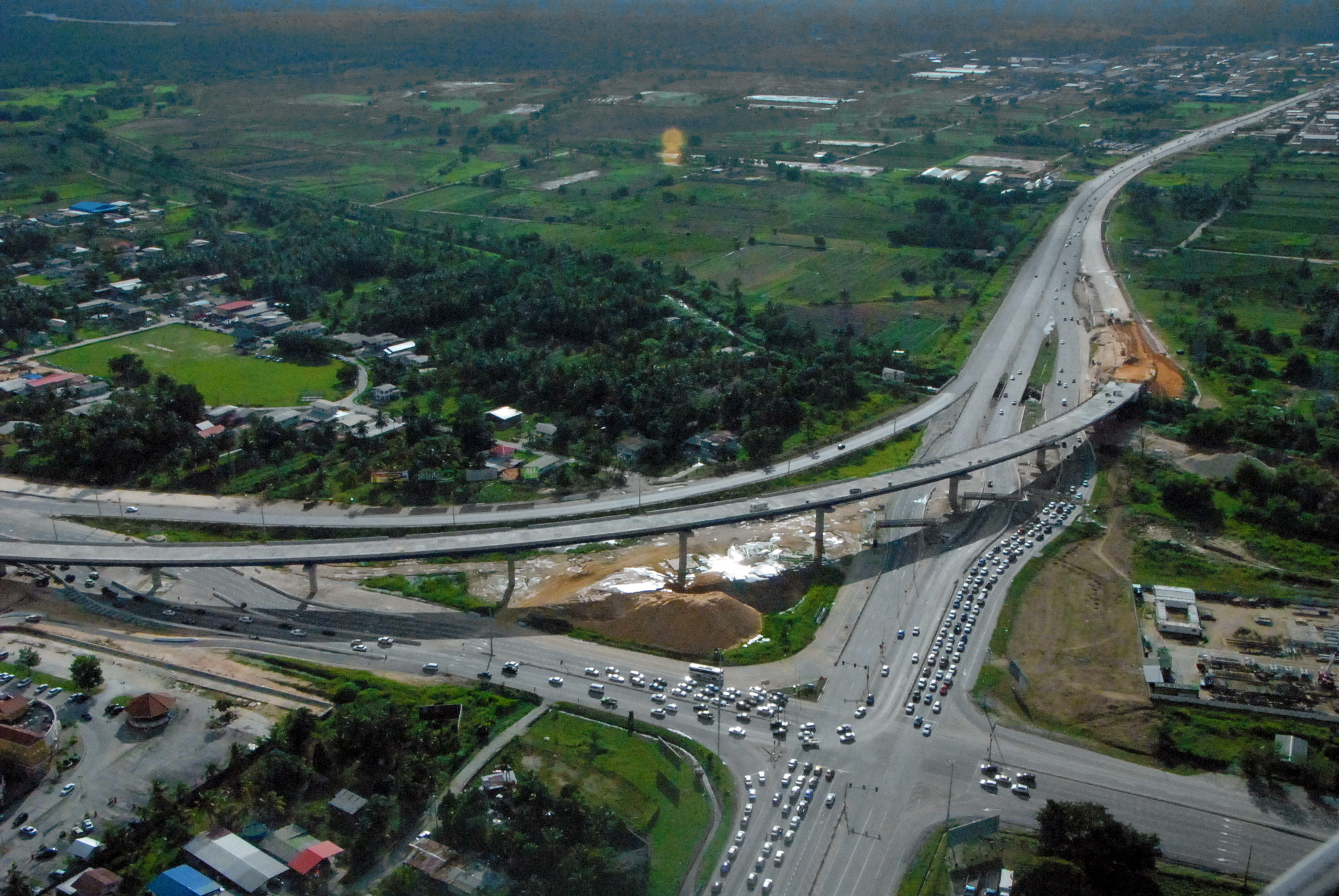
An intersection of Churchill–Roosevelt Highway and Uriah Butler Highway, 2009

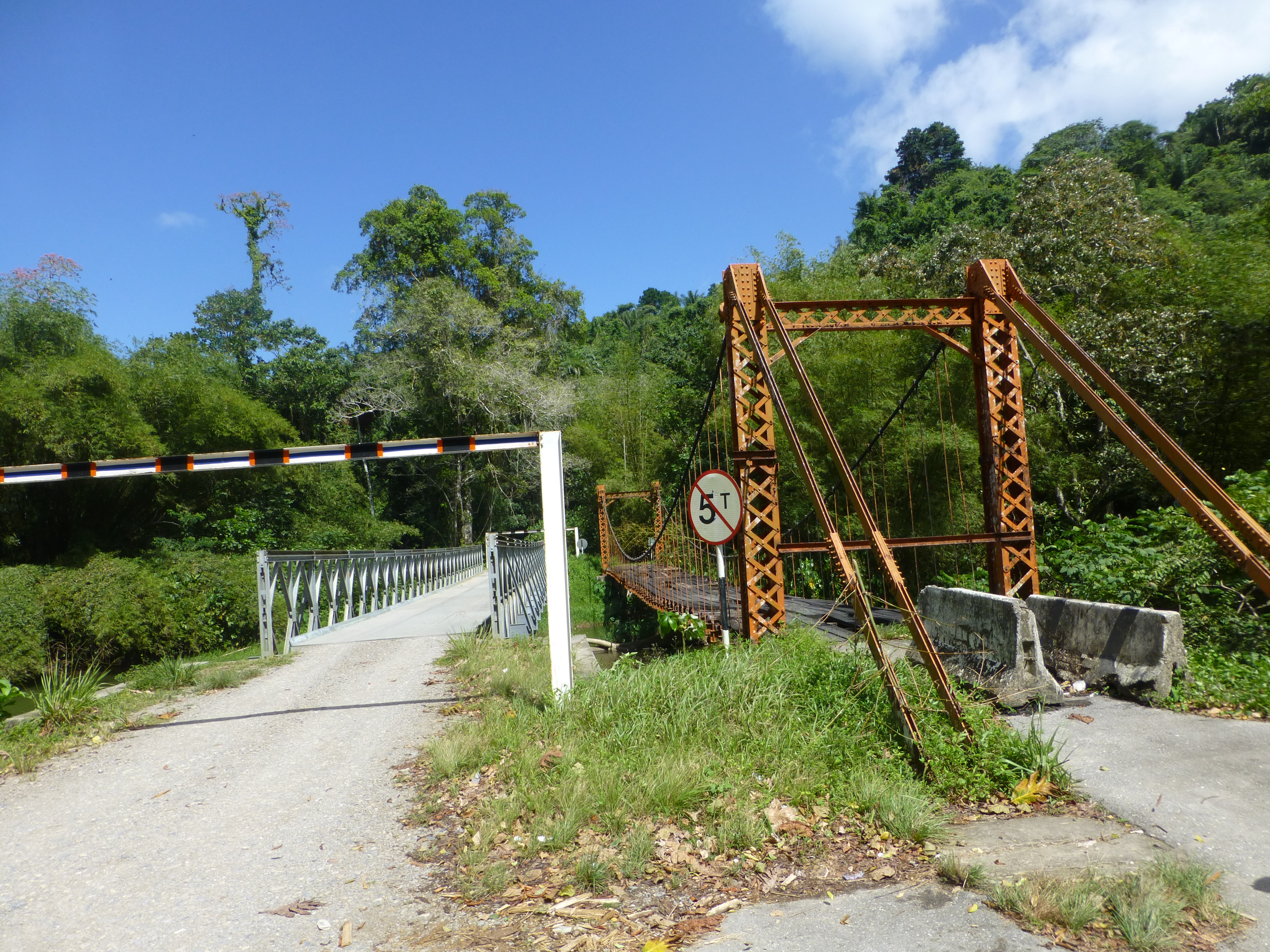
Old and new bridges in Trinidad side by side

Trinidad and Tobago, a country that relies heavily on industrialisation and tourism, has various transport systems. The nation drives on the left, and has a network of roads and highways. There is also some ports and smaller harbors, as well as highways.

== Air service ==
Trinidad is the larger island, with a business-oriented economy and the seat of the country's government. Piarco International Airport serves the island of Trinidad with international flights to destinations in the Caribbean, South America, North America and Europe. The airport is located in the town of Piarco off the Churchill Roosevelt Highway, 30 km (19 miles) away from Port of Spain. It has been voted the best airport in the Caribbean on numerous occasions.

A smaller number of international flights fly directly to Tobago's A.N.R. Robinson International Airport (formerly Crown Point International Airport). The airport is mostly kept active by the domestic airbridge, a heavily subsidized flight service between Trinidad and Tobago, operated as much as 20 times per day by Caribbean Airlines. According to Aviation Week Network for the first quarter of 2025 "Trinidad’s Piarco International Airport to Tobago’s ANR Robinson International Airport is the largest domestic route," with Caribbean Airlines being fifth place of the top 5 airlines for departure seat capacity in the Caribbean region.

There is also a small airfield named Camden Airstrip in Couva, which is mainly used for cropdusting planes.

== Public transport ==
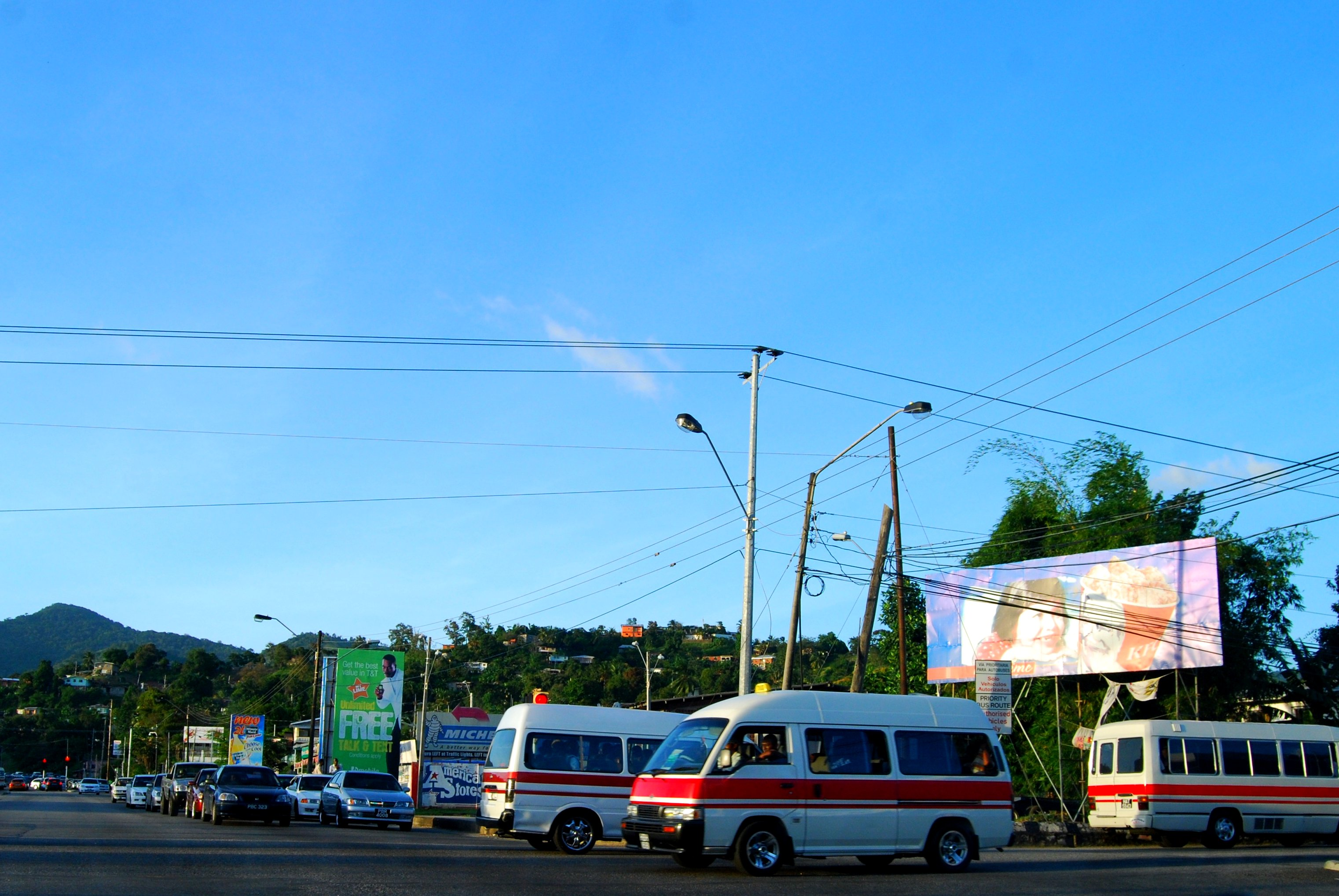
Several private red band Maxi Taxis seen operating on the Priority Bus Route in Trinidad. Red Band Maxis run along the East–West Corridor from Port of Spain to Arima.

Public transport is provided by a bus service operated by government-owned Public Transport Service Corporation (PTSC), privately owned mini-buses (locally known as maxi-taxis) and privately owned cars. Maxi-taxis and some cars carry passengers along fixed routes for a fixed fare, although cars are slightly more expensive for similar routes carried by maxi-taxis because of their much smaller passenger capacities. Car taxis are not allowed to utilise the Priority Bus Route, and as such maxi-taxis and buses are preferable for speedily entering and exiting the cities (especially Port of Spain) during rush hour (7am–9am and 4pm–6pm).

In downtown Port of Spain on a street referred to as South Quay is the historic site of the Trinidad Government Rail (TGR) building at #60 South Quay, Port of Spain. This former railway facility is now the current administrative and bus loading headquarters of the Public Transport Service Corporation (PTSC). The compound also houses the Maxi Taxi loading facility which is located in its north-eastern quadrant. The Maxi Taxi loading facility is utilized by both route two or red-banded Maxi Taxis and route three which are green-banded. The red-banded Maxi Taxis ply for hire from Port of Spain eastward to as far as the town of Sangre Grande. Green-banded Maxi Taxis ply for hire from Port of Spain in a southern direction to either Chaguanas which is considered central Trinidad or to the region of San Fernando located along the south-western coast of Trinidad. The entire PTSC compound located on South Quay Port of Spain is officially referred to as The Port of Spain Transit Centre. The name "City Gate" to which the facility is popularly referred cannot be legally or officially used by the PTSC or on any official documentation used to refer to this facility.

Other Maxi Taxis such as the Route one or yellow-banded Maxis ply for hire from Port of Spain to West/ North- West Trinidad. This loading facility is located at #19-21 South Quay in downtown Port of Spain approximately two hundred meters West of the PTSC. This Route one facility caters to persons travelling to locations such as Diego Martin, Petit Valley, St. James, Carenage, Chaguaramas and Maraval.

In all other locations and for Port of Spain Intra-city transportation, taxi-stands are scattered at various streets of the town or region, and after sunset some of these taxi-stands may change location, although this changed location is also fixed. Recently there has also been a growth in popularity of American-style taxi-cabs that do not work along a fixed route and they can be booked for specific times for specific journeys.

In 2023, you'd notice quite a few commuters using bicycles. There has been an uptick over the pandemic, since cars are very expensive. There are no bike lanes for transport in Trinidad and Tobago, although several areas are tiny and easily bikeable.

== Ferry service ==
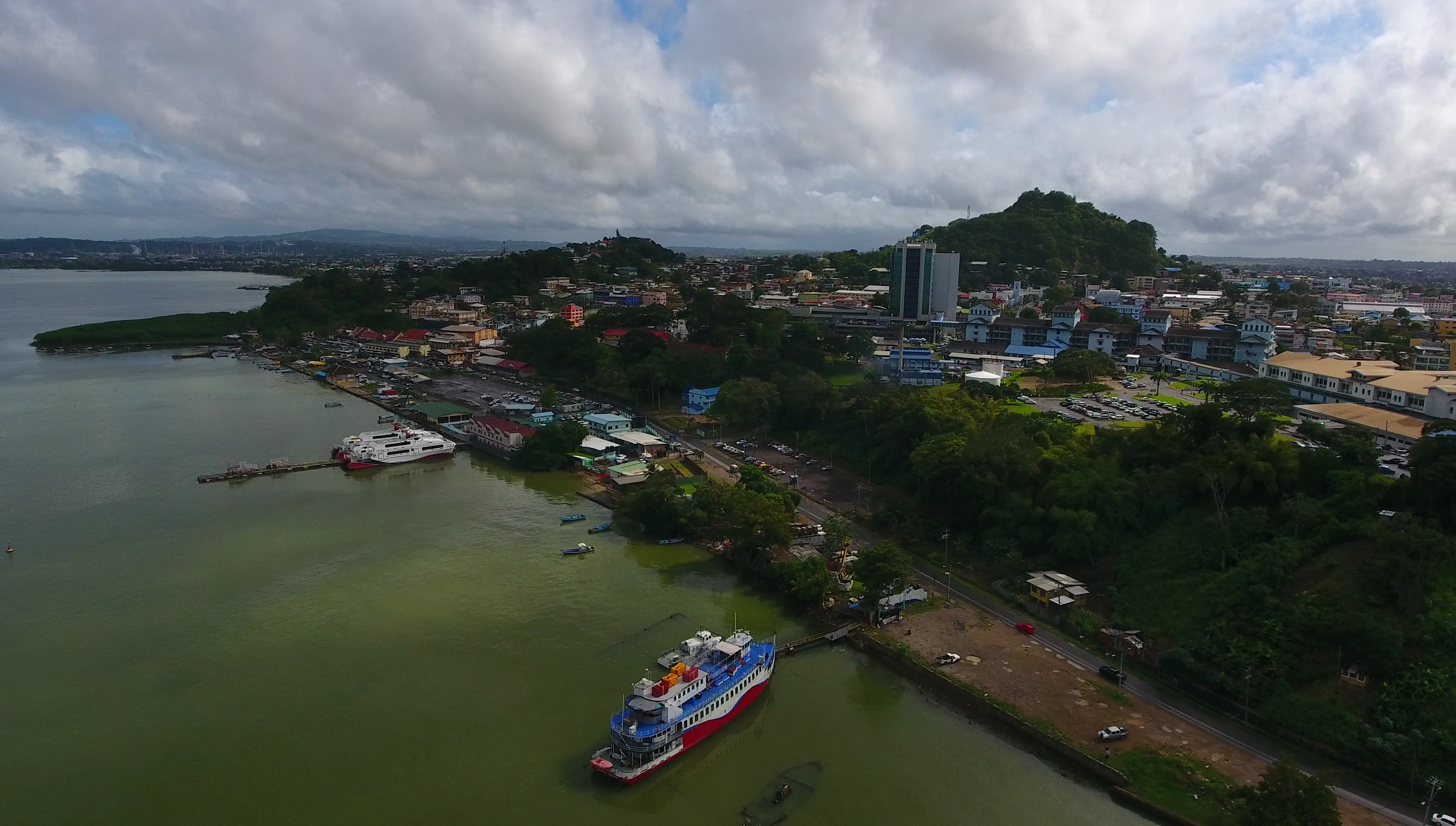
King's Wharf with water taxis in San Fernando

Ferries operate between Port of Spain and Scarborough. Cars can be brought onto the ferries and kept in the cargo areas. Ferries run daily, Sundays to Sunday (fewer sailings on the weekend). The ferries are inexpensive, in spite of the minimum 2½–3-hour travel time between Port of Spain and Scarborough.

The Water Taxi Service operates between the cities of Port of Spain and San Fernando at a peak rate of five sailings from San Fernando to Port of Spain per morning. Each sailing carries approximately 400 passengers. Travel time is 50 minutes and the cost of the service is heavily subsidized.

== Railways ==
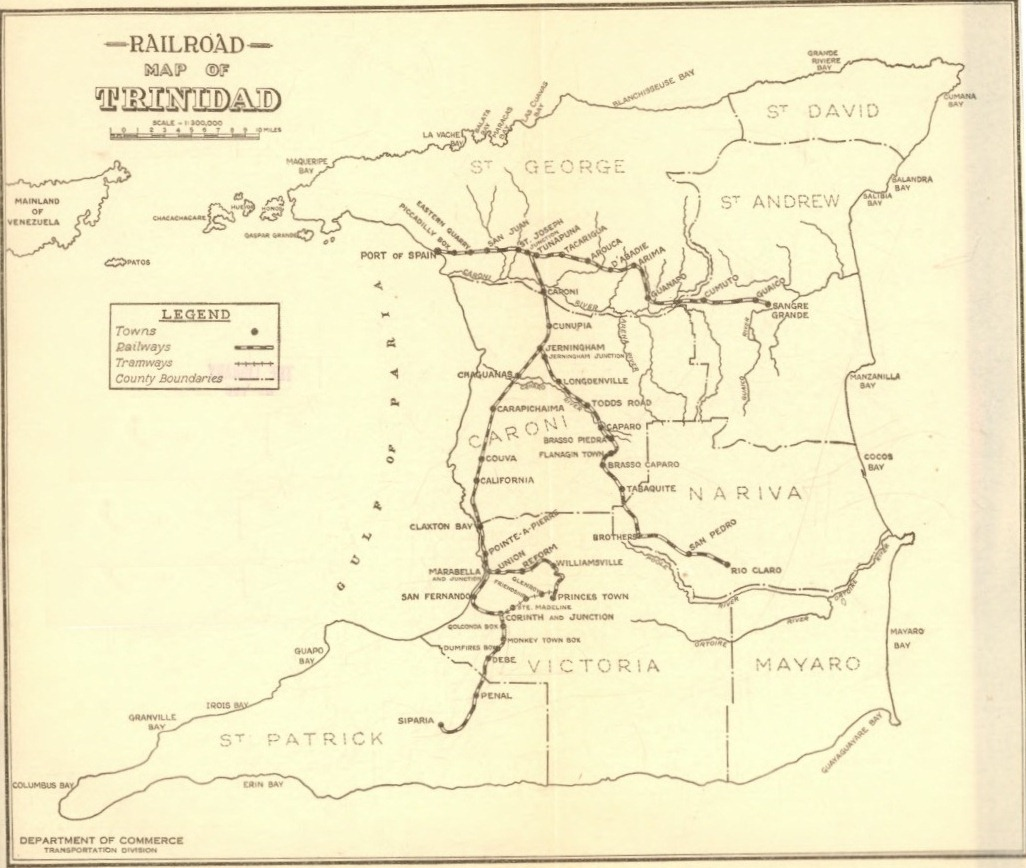
Rail map as of 1925

There was a minimal agricultural railway system near San Fernando, but the Trinidad Government Railway that was built while Trinidad and Tobago was a colony of the United Kingdom was gradually scaled back until it was discontinued in 1968. (The narrow-gauge agricultural railway was shut down in the late 1990s).

On April 11, 2008 the Trinitrain consortium announced it would plan and build the 105 km (65 mi) two-line Trinidad Rapid Railway. It was claimed that the new railways were needed to overcome growing road congestion. However the project was cancelled in September 2010.

== Roads ==
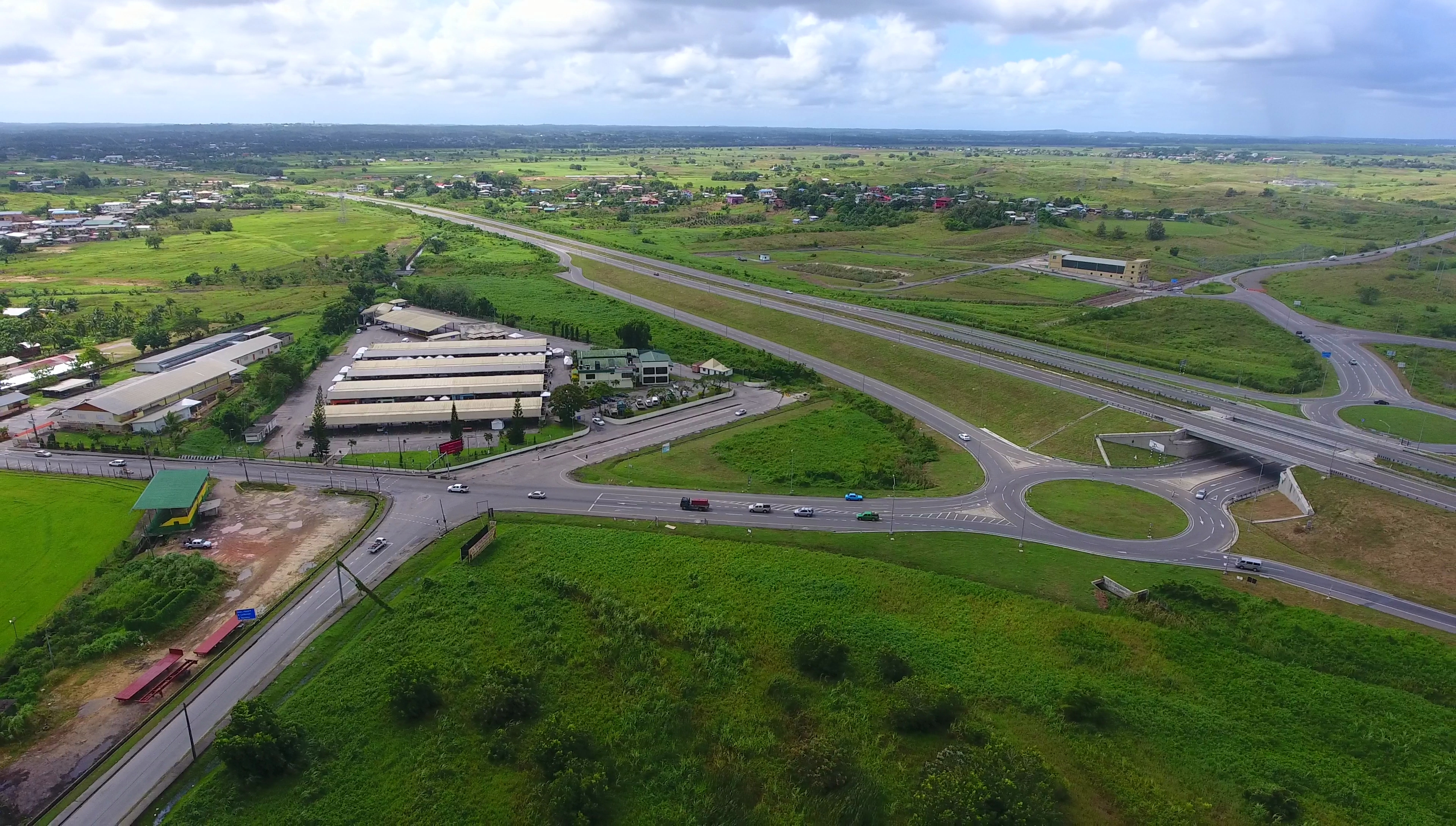
Sir Solomon Hochoy Highway

As of 2021, there are 9,592 km of roads in the country. The Ministry of Works and Transport (MOWT) Highway Division maintains 2,050 km, including all highways.

Trinidad also has a large and complex highway network that consists of three 6-lane freeways and four 4-lane freeways:

- Churchill–Roosevelt Highway, runs from Barataria to Wallerfield, and extends for 30 km.
- Uriah Butler Highway, runs from Champs Fleurs to Chaguanas and extends for 15.7 km.
- Beetham Highway that connects Barataria to Downtown Port of Spain
- Sir Solomon Hochoy Highway that connect Chaguanas to Debe and is currently being extended to Point Fortin
- Audrey Jeffers Highway that connects West Port of Spain to Cocorite
- Reinzi Kirton Highway
- Diego Martin Highway

Tobago Highways (2-Lane Freeway)

- Claude Noel Highway that connects Canaan to Scarborough

Minor Highways

- San Fernando By-Pass that runs through San Fernando.
- Wrightson Road that runs through Port of Spain.
- Rivulet Road that runs through Couva.
- South Trunk Road that runs from San Fernando to Mon Desir.

== Statistics ==
Pipelines: crude oil 1,032 km; petroleum products 19 km; natural gas 904 km

Ports and harbours: Pointe-à-Pierre, Point Fortin, Point Lisas, Port of Spain, Scarborough, Tembladora

Merchant marine:
total: 2 ships (1,000 gross tonnage (GT) or over) totaling 2,439 GT/4,040 tonnes deadweight (DWT)
ships by type: (1999 est.)

- cargo ship 1
- petroleum tanker 1

Airports: 6 (1999 est.)

Airports - with paved runways:
total: 3
over 3,047 m: 1
2,438 to 3,047 m: 1
1,524 to 2,437 m: 1 (1999 est.)

Airports - with unpaved runways:
total: 3
914 to 1,523 m: 1
under 914 m: 2 (1999 est.)

(Transportation information from the CIA World Handbook.)
