= Public Transport Service Corporation =

- Founded: May 1st 1965
- Headquarters: Port of Spain, Trinidad.
- Locale: Trinidad and Tobago
- Service area: Nationwide
- Service type: Bus rapid transit Commuter rail (planned)
- Hubs: City Gate, Port Of Spain, Trinidad and Tobago
- Fleet: +300
- Website: http://ptsc.co.tt/

The Public Transport Service Corporation or better known as PTSC is the state-owned public transport provider for Trinidad and Tobago. Its headquarters are at City Gate in Port of Spain (formerly the Trinidad Government Railway headquarters). Passengers have to buy the tickets at a ticket booth and show it to the driver. The fares vary with distance. There are two type of buses: the blue-and-white buses are the regular and the red-and-white are the express commuter buses.

== History ==
Trinidad began with the establishment of the Trinidad Railway Company in 1846. The Company surveyed the country with the intention of implementing a railway system. However, the finances needed to continue with this project were not available.

Subsequently, on Saturday 5 March 1859, the Cipero Tramroad became Trinidad's first railway. It was planters’ line that passed between Mission (now Princes Town) and Kings Wharf at San Fernando. It was used primarily to transport produce from the remote estates of the Naparimas out to Kings Wharf to waiting ships. The man responsible for this tramway was sugar planter William Eccles.

The tramway's primary purpose was transporting produce but there was also demand for the transportation of workers from one estate to another along the line. A number of prominent persons also indicated their desire to commute by tramway rather than by horseback. It also acted as the first postal service between San Fernando and Mission. The Cipero Tramroad was greatly successful and lasted up to the 1920s before it was absorbed into the Trinidad Government Railway.

In 1974, the disused rail lines were transformed into dedicated bus lanes.

== City Service ==
PTSC city service is a service which operates within both Port of Spain and San Fernando.

== Travel Card ==
The PTSC Travel Card gives a choice of unlimited travel along specific routes being operated by the Public Transport Service Corporation.

In 1993, the Travel Card alternative was introduced and to date its Membership has steadily increased.

== Fleet ==
P.T.S.C. Fleet Info
