= National Infrastructure Development Company =

Government-owned infrastructure company in Trinidad and Tobago

National Infrastructure Development Company Limited (NIDCO)
- Formation: January 11, 2005
- Location: Port of Spain
- Website: http://www.nidco.co.tt/

The National Infrastructure Development Company Limited (NIDCO), is a state-owned company of Trinidad and Tobago.

== History ==
It was founded on January 11, 2005, but the inaugural Board was appointed on 22 March 2005. It is carrying out infrastructure projects that form Vision 2020, which is a plan created by the government, to achieve first world status, by the year 2020.

NIDCO's major infrastructure projects missions are drainage and flood control, reclamation, highway, and transportation sectors, and also NIDCO is responsible for the provision of project management services, procurement of consultants and contractors, and oversight of project execution within agreed time, costs and quality parameters.

== Projects ==
- Water Taxis Service-Its owned by NIDCO
- San Fernando to Point Fortin Highway-Proposed Highway
- Trinidad Rapid Railway-In September 2010, the project was scrapped by the People's Partnership Government
- Aranguez Flyover
- Point Fortin Highway
- Solomon Hochoy Highway extension
