= San Fernando By-Pass =

Bypass road in Trinidad and Tobago

Route information
- Length: 4.9 km (3.0 mi)
- Existed: 1940s–present

Major junctions
- North end: Marabella
- South end: Cipero Street, San Fernando

Location
- Country: Trinidad and Tobago
- Major cities: San Fernando

Highway system
- Transport in Trinidad and Tobago

The San Fernando By-Pass is a major bypass road on the island of Trinidad, in Trinidad and Tobago. It runs for 4.9 kilometres (3.0 mi).

It bypasses the city of San Fernando, separating the inner city from the suburbs on the outskirts and the Sir Solomon Hochoy Highway. It runs from Marabella to the South Trunk Road interchange at Cipero Street.

== History ==
Construction on the road began in the 1940s to allow traffic to pass along the eastern boundaries of the city as opposed to the centre. The road is suspected to have opened in the mid-1950s and has since been expanded and upgraded to a four-lane dual carriageway as we know it today.

== Description ==
=== Route ===
The road is a bypass route of the city of San Fernando and environs. The northern terminus of the road is at the Marabella Roundabout, where it begins as a two lane road. It runs south past Tarouba and the Tarouba Link Road, then past St. Joseph Village, and the Mon Repos Roundabout, which provides access to the Naparima Mayaro Road and Royal Road. The road meets two closely spaced lights at Pleasantville and Navet Road, then meets Rushworth Street. After Rushworth Street, it meets Scott Street, which filters traffic from Cipero Street leaving the city, and Chaconia Avenue, which provides access to the Pleasantville Circular. The road terminates shortly after at the Cipero Street Interchange, meeting Cipero Street, South Trunk Road, Golconda Connector Road and S.S. Erin Road.

=== Features ===
Excluding the Marabella to Tarouba segment, which is two lanes, the entire route is a four-lane dual carriageway. It is not grade separated and suffers from frequent congestion during rush hour, especially at the Tarouba and Mon Repos roundabouts.

The road suffers from flooding during periods of heavy rainfall.
