= Audrey Jeffers Highway =

Highway in Trinidad and Tobago

Coordinates: 10.6678°N 61.5366°W

Route information
- Length: 3.6 km (2.2 mi)
- Existed: 1946–present

Major junctions
- East end: Downtown Port of Spain
- West end: Cocorite, Port of Spain

Location
- Country: Trinidad and Tobago
- Major cities: Port of Spain

Highway system
- Transport in Trinidad and Tobago

The Audrey Jeffers Highway is a highway in Trinidad and Tobago. It runs west from Downtown Port of Spain to Cocorite. The highway runs from the Hasely Crawford Stadium to the Cocorite area parallel to Mucurapo Road and the Western Main Road in St. James. It is named in honour of Audrey Jeffers, a social worker and Trinidad and Tobago's first female Member of Parliament.

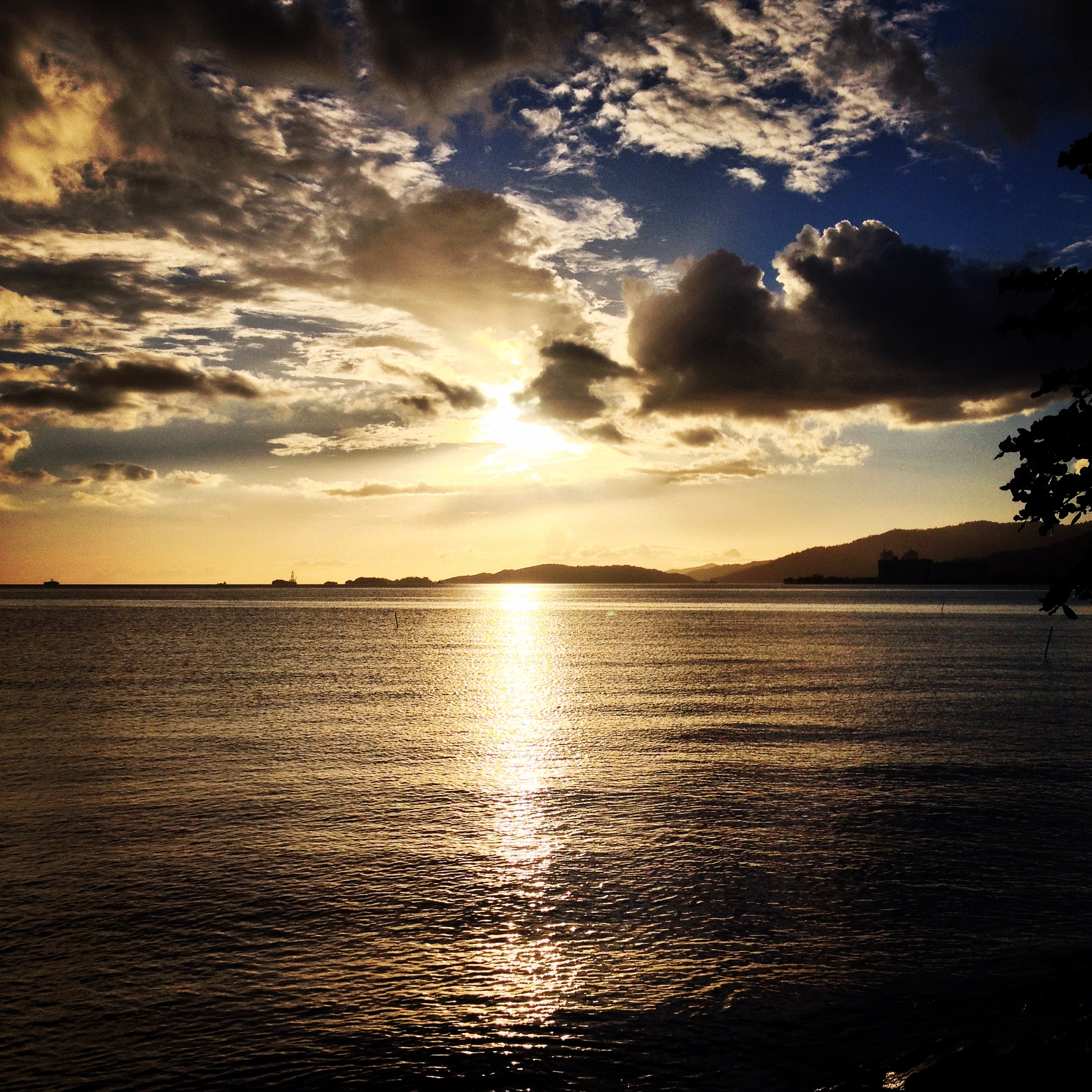
Looking west towards the Gulf of Paria from the Foreshore, Audrey Jeffers Highway, Trinidad

== Exit List ==
The following table lists the major junctions along the Audrey Jeffers Highway. The entire route is located in Trinidad.

Region	Location	Km	Mile	Exit	Destinations	Notes
Port of Spain		0.0	0.0	—	Western Main Road	Western terminus; Continuation from Diego Martin
Port of Spain		0.5	0.31	1	Link Road	Traffic Lights
Port of Spain		2.05	1.27	2	Maraval Parkway	Traffic Lights
Port of Spain		3.6	2.2	—	Wrightson Road – Port of Spain General Hospital	Eastern Terminus; roadway continues east into Downtown Port of Spain as Wrightson Road.
1.000 mi = 1.609 km; 1.000 km = 0.621 mi: Closed/former; Concurrency terminus; Incomplete access; Tolled; Route transition; Unopened
