= Southern Main Road =

Highway in Trinidad and Tobago

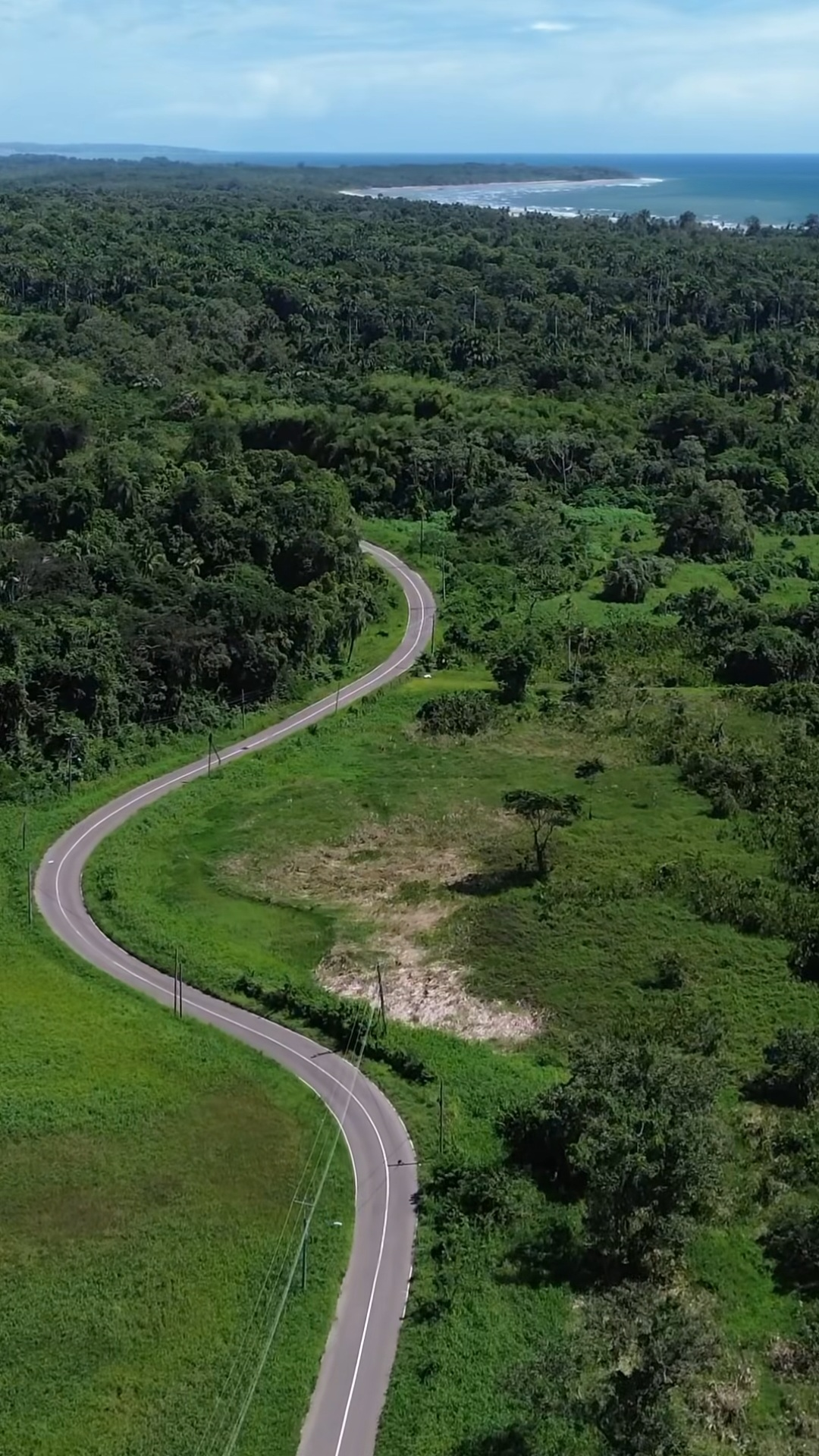

Route information
- Length: 120 km (75 mi)

Major junctions
- North end: Curepe
- South end: Icacos

Location
- Country: Trinidad and Tobago
- Major cities: Chaguanas, Couva, San Fernando, and Point Fortin

Highway system
- Transport in Trinidad and Tobago

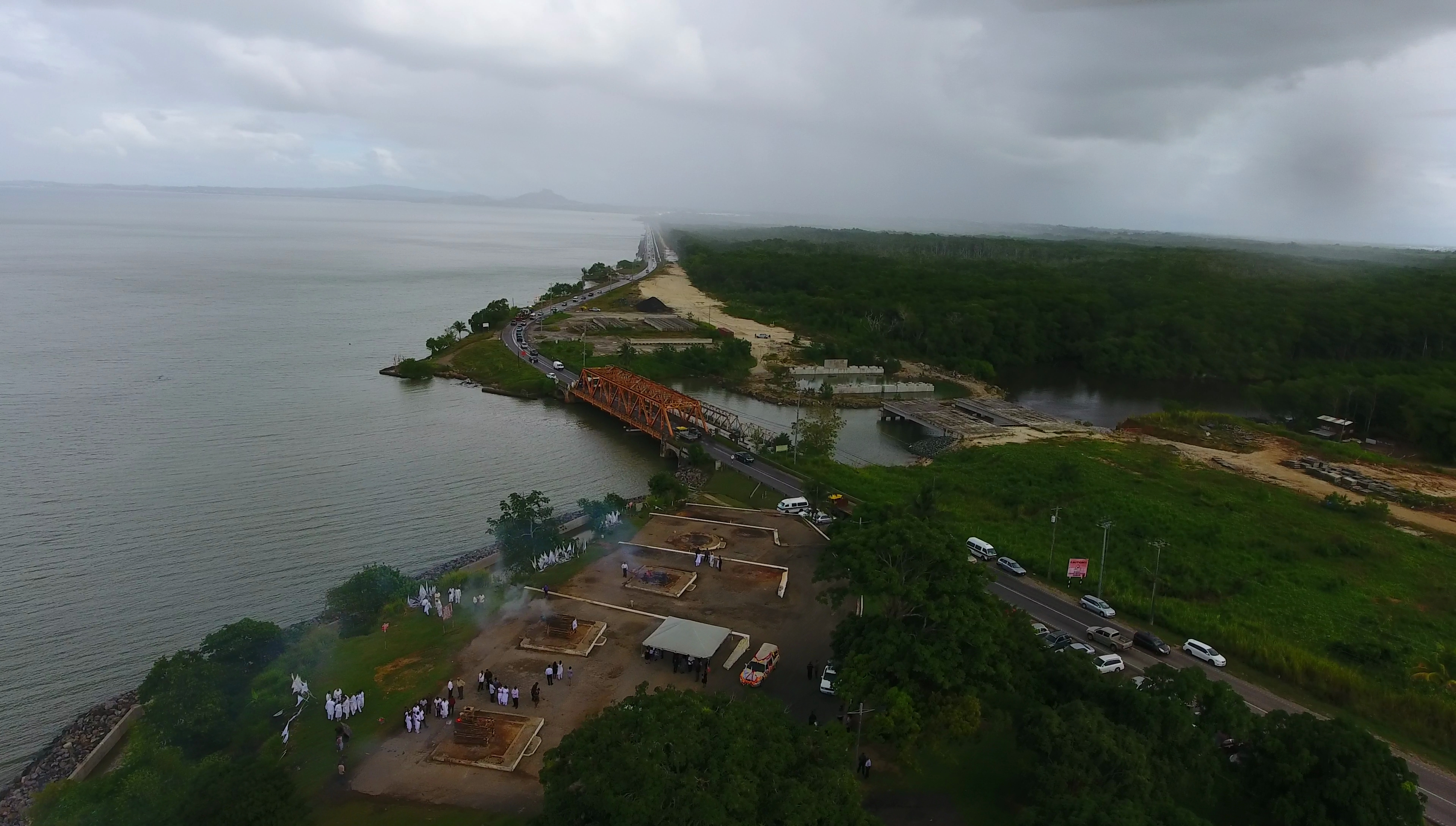
Southern Main Road at South Oropouche

The Southern Main Road is a major road in Trinidad and Tobago running from Curepe in the north through Chaguanas, Couva, San Fernando, and Point Fortin to Icacos in the southwest, over a now discontinuous length of 120 km.

== History ==
The Southern Main Road was the major north–south road in Trinidad until 1957, when the Princess Margaret Highway (now the Uriah Butler Highway) was built to more directly connect Chaguanas with the Churchill-Roosevelt Highway, and in the 1970s, when the Sir Solomon Hochoy Highway was built to connect Chaguanas with San Fernando. The Southern Main Road remains the major road connecting San Fernando with Point Fortin, but plans are underway to extend the Sir Solomon Hochoy Highway to Point Fortin.

The Southern Main Road makes its way through communities such as Caroni, Cunupia, Chaguanas, Freeport, St. Mary's, McBean, Couva, Pt. Lisas, California, Claxton Bay in Central Trinidad before passing into Marabella, Vistabella, and San Fernando. In the areas just listed, the Southern Main Road (sometimes simply referred to by the locals as "de main road" or "de old road") contains most of the business establishments.

== Description ==
=== Route ===
The Southern Main Road remains a major thoroughfare for many communities, especially in the central and southwest areas of the island. It begins at a junction with the Eastern Main Road in Curepe, and runs due south towards the Caroni River, where it runs alongside La Paille and Caroni villages. The road then turns south again and runs through Cunupia and Enterprise before entering Chaguanas. In Chaguanas, it makes up the major roadway in the centre of Chaguanas. It then runs alongside the Sir Solomon Hochoy Highway towards Chase Village, eventually diverging from the highway into Couva, Claxton Bay and Marabella before terminating at Zurcher St at Vistabella in San Fernando. This is the first continuous segment.

The second segment begins in Duncan Village, running through Bamboo Village and La Romain, before joining the South Trunk Road and running along the Gulf of Paria towards Oropouche. At St. Mary's, the South Trunk Road turns south and the Southern Main Road continues into Rousillac and towards La Brea, Vessigny and Guapo before arriving in Point Fortin. After Point Fortin, the road continues towards Cedros, passing through Chatham and Irois, and finally passing through Cedros onto the southern terminus of Icacos, a small fishing village at the southernmost tip of Trinidad.

=== Features ===
Having been built in the 20th century, the majority of the road is two lanes except for a few sections that are four lanes; Curepe Interchange, Caroni South Bank, Chaguanas Busy Corner, Marabella and South Oropouche.

Many business in the communities serviced by the road are located along the road and as such there are few high-speed sections of road; it is subject to frequent stopping and slow traffic to the aid of pedestrians and incoming traffic.
