= Western Main Road =

Highway in Trinidad and Tobago

Route information
- Length: 15.6 km (9.7 mi)

Major junctions
- East end: Port of Spain
- West end: Chaguaramas

Location
- Country: Trinidad and Tobago
- Major cities: Port of Spain, Diego Martin

Highway system
- Transport in Trinidad and Tobago

The Western Main Road is the main road in Trinidad and Tobago that runs west from Green Corner in downtown Port of Spain, through St. James, where it is the main thoroughfare, til the Military Base in Chaguaramas.

It is most notable as the scene of the Hosay which his held annually in May or June.
