= Walsh Wrightson =

British engineer (1852-1935)

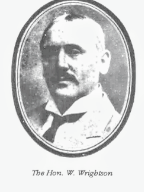
Wrightson c.1900

Walsh Wrightson CMG (28 October 1852 – 3 September 1935) was a British engineer who served his career in Ceylon and Trinidad and Tobago in the late 19th and early 20th century.

== Early life and education ==
Wrightson was born on 28 October 1852, son of William Wrightson of Yorkshire. He was educated at Leeds Grammar School.

== Career ==
Wrightson joined the Ceylon civil service in 1875 as an engineer, and carried out many public works including the restoration of ancient Sinhalese irrigation works and the Kala Wewa reservoir, for which he was promoted by Governor Sir Arthur Hamilton-Gordon.

In 1895, he went to Trinidad and Tobago to take up the appointment of Director of Works of Trinidad and Tobago, and completed many infrastructure projects including roads, bridges, a rail tunnel and a sewer system. He was a member of the Executive and Legislative Councils of Trinidad and Tobago from 1895 until his retirement in 1907.

In 1903, he became embroiled in the Water Riots which occurred in Port of Spain which was a protest against a new ordinance which required the installation of water meters in homes and increased water rates, which Wrightson drafted and promoted.

== Personal life and death ==
Wrightson married Helen Maud Montague Armitage in 1892. After he retired in 1907, he served as the chairman of the Reigate Board of Guardians (1910–1919) and as a member of Surrey County Council (1912–1919). Wrightson died in Mandeville, Jamaica, where he had a second home, on 3 September 1935, aged 82.

== Honours ==
Wrightson was appointed Companion of the Order of St Michael and St George (CMG) in the 1900 Birthday Honours. Wrightson Road, Port of Spain, Trinidad and Tobago is named after him.
