= Diego Martins =

Diego Martins may refer to:

- Diego Martins (footballer, born 1983), Brazilian football midfielder
- Diego Martins (footballer, born 1987), Brazilian football midfielder

== See also ==
- Diego Martin (disambiguation)
- Dhiego Martins (born 1988), Brazilian football forward
