= Wrightson Road =

Highway in Trinidad and Tobago

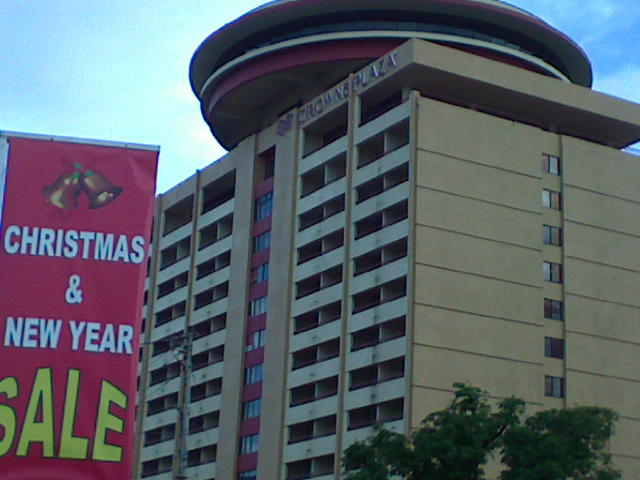
Crowne Plaza Hotel, Wrightson Road

Wrightson Road, named after Walsh Wrightson, British engineer and Director of the Public Works Department (1897–1907), links downtown Port of Spain, Trinidad and Tobago with the Audrey Jeffers Highway. It runs from the area of the Eric Williams Financial Complex to meet the Audrey Jeffers Highway near the Hasely Crawford Stadium. It runs past the fire headquarters, the old post office, central police station, Powergen power station, Capital Plaza hotel, the cruise ship terminal and the National Flour Mills. The street lights were unique of the hat top design then were replaced by standard oval type this is also removed during the process of road improvement and better lighting. It has been proposed that the western segment of the proposed light rail system will run along Wrightson Road.
