= Bonne Aventure =

Coordinates: 10°20′0″N 61°24′0″W

Bonne Aventure (French: "Good Adventure") is a village in the Couva–Tabaquite–Talparo region in western Trinidad and Tobago. It is considered to be part of the larger town of Gasparillo.

The surrounding villages or areas that are most populated are Mayo and Gasparillo. Other areas of concentration are alongside the main roads such as Light Bourne Trace, Cotton Hill Rd., Caratal Rd., Parforce Rd and Cocoa Piece.

== History ==
Bonne Aventure was largely a sugar plantation. After the abolishment of slavery and the subsequent era of indentured labour, many Indian workers paid a nominal fee to the estate land owners to cultivate the land with sugar, cotton or cocoa crops. They built homes and remained on the land for several generations for the price of the annual land tax, long after sugar was bringing in a source of substantial income. Much of the land was converted into grazing fields for large livestock or used to build homes and communities. Many of the landholders opted to pay off the estates' owners to take over complete ownership.

== Schools ==
The main elementary school for Bonne Aventure is the Bonne Aventure Presbyterian School, located on School Trace off the main Bonne Aventure Rd. The nearest high schools are Williamsville Secondary School, Gasparillo Secondary School (formally Gasparillo Composite School) and Marabella Secondary School.

== Ethnicity and Religion ==
The village has a cosmopolitan mix of residents but is composed mainly of the 2 major groups in Trinidad: people of Indian and African descent. Religious adherents include Hindus, Presbyterians, Muslims and Catholics. Consequently, one can find numerous religious establishments throughout the village; Muslim mosques, Hindu temples and Christian churches of multiple denominations.

== Geography ==
Bonne Aventure is low-lying and is just upstream from the Guaracara River. The Bonne Aventure main road runs South West to North East from the Gasparillo overpass to Cotton Hill.

== Climate ==
Bonne Aventure has a lowland seasonal tropical climate with a wet season lasting from June to November and a dry season lasting from January to May. Unlike Port of Spain, Bonne Aventure has a usually hot and sweltering climate year round, with an exception for the wet season.

== Infrastructure ==
=== Utilities ===
Electric generation is handled by Powergen, while electrical distribution is handled by the Trinidad and Tobago Electricity Commission (T&TEC). Bonne Adventure does not contain its own power generation facilities. Harmony Hall T&TEC Substation is used to regulate voltage for the Bonne Aventure.

Water and sewerage are under the purview of the Water and Sewerage Authority of Trinidad and Tobago (WASA).

The town is served by all major telecommunication (including cable, satellite) companies, e.g. TSTT, Columbus Communications, Digicel, DirecTV, and Greendot.

== See also ==
- Gasparillo
