= Diego Martin Highway =

Highway in Trinidad and Tobago

Route information
- Length: 5 km (3.1 mi)

Major junctions
- North end: Cocorite
- South end: Diamond Vale

Location
- Country: Trinidad and Tobago
- Major cities: Port of Spain, Diego Martin

Highway system
- Transport in Trinidad and Tobago

The Diego Martin Highway is a highway in Trinidad and Tobago. It runs north from Cocorite to Diamond Vale. The highway meets the Audrey Jeffers Highway in Cocorite and runs north–south to Wendy Fitzwillliam Boulevard in Diamond Vale.
