= Water Taxi Service =

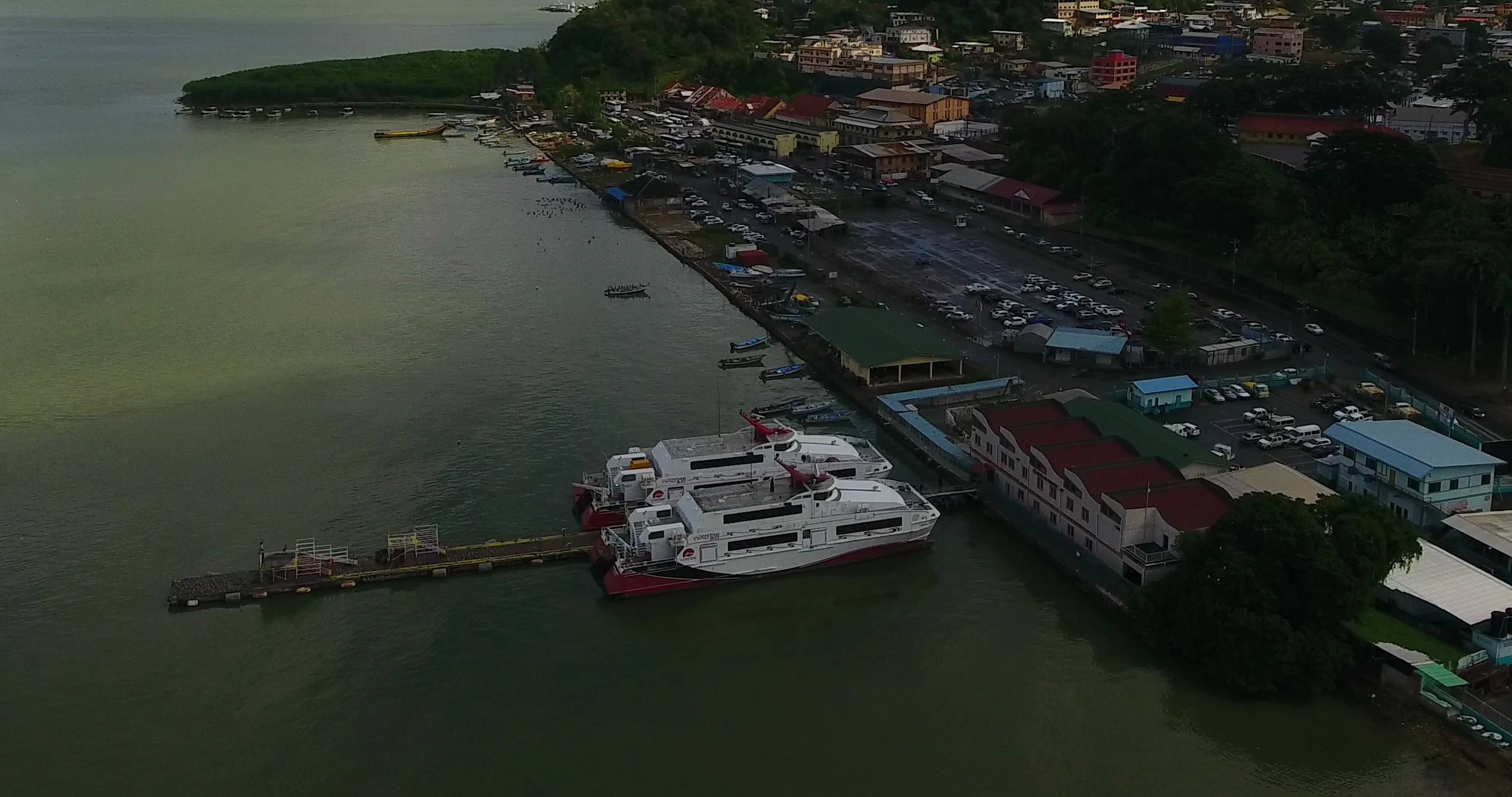
- Locale: Trinidad, Trinidad and Tobago
- Waterway: Gulf of Paria
- Transit type: Water taxi
- Owner: National Infrastructure Development Company Limited
- No. of lines: 1
- No. of vessels: 4
- No. of terminals: 2

Water Taxi Service operates in the Trinidadian cities as an alternate form of transportation to and from Port of Spain and San Fernando.

== Expansion ==
Water Taxis expansion is under construction for terminals at Chaguanas, Point Fortin, and Point Cumana.

== Operators ==
=== Stations ===
Name	Transfers	Facilities	Location
Water Taxi Terminal (Downtown POS)			Port of Spain
Water Taxi Terminal (San Fernando)			San Fernando

== Current fleet vessels ==
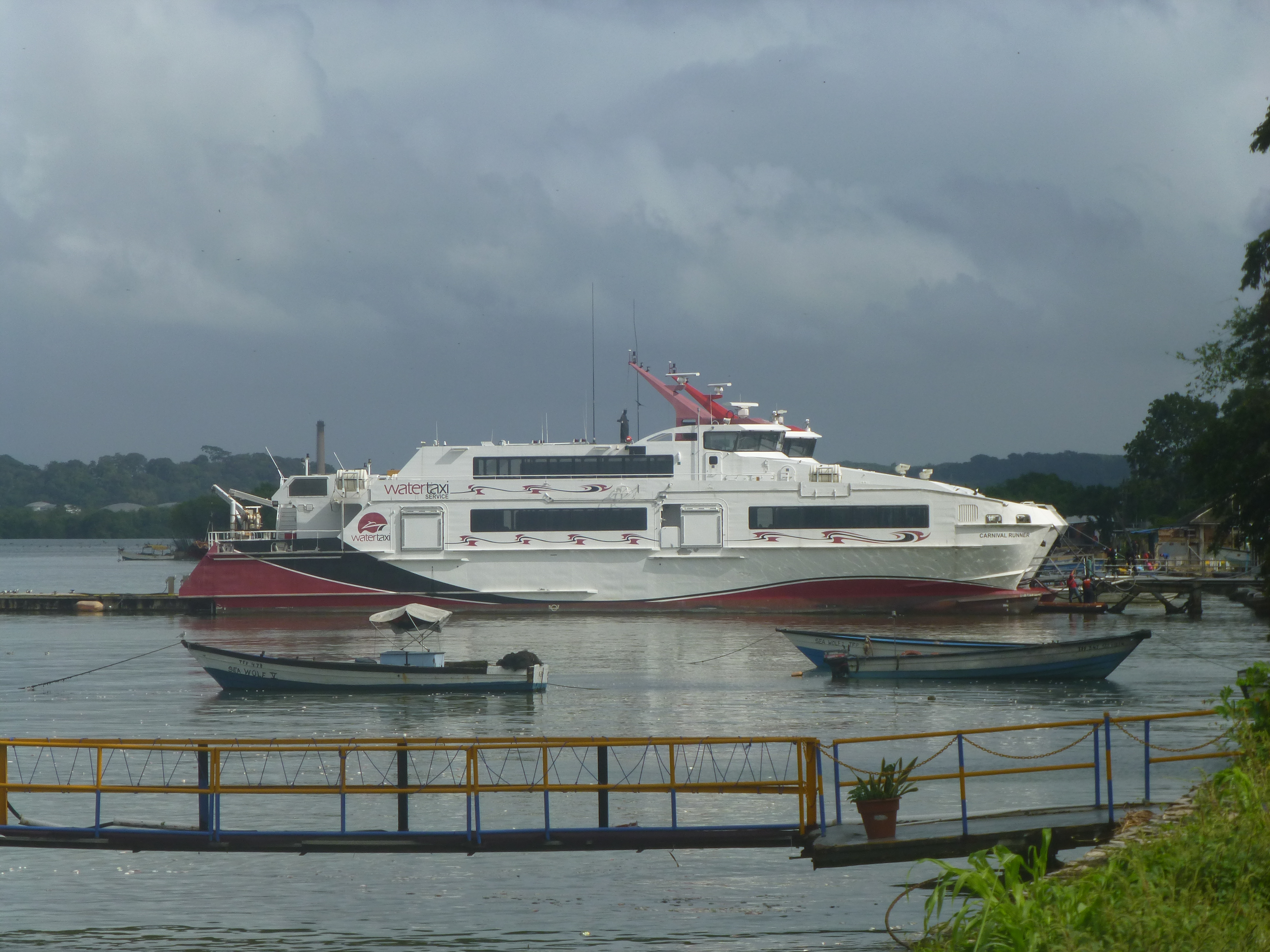
PS Carnival Runner

Name	Built	Entered service	Tonnage	Passengers	Registered
Paria Bullet	2010	2010		405	Port of Spain
Calypso Sprinter	2010	2010		405	Port of Spain
Trini Flash	2010	2010		405	Port of Spain
Carnival Runner	2010	2010		405	Port of Spain

== Former fleet vessels ==
Name	Built	Entered service	Ended service	Passengers	Registered	Notes
H.C. Olivia	2004	2008	2010	150	(Trinidad and Tobago) Port of Spain	
H.C. Milancia	2004	2008	2010	150	(Trinidad and Tobago) Port of Spain	
H.C. Katia	2004	2008	2010	150	(Trinidad and Tobago) Port of Spain	

== See also ==
- Water taxi
- NIDCO
