= Diego Martín (Chilean footballer) =

Chilean footballer (born 1999)

Personal information
- Full name: Diego Arturo Martín Bravo
- Date of birth: 28 September 1999 (age 27)
- Place of birth: Providencia, Santiago, Chile
- Positions: Centre-back; defensive midfielder

Youth career
- Universidad Católica

Senior career*
Years	Team	Apps	(Gls)
2019–2021	Deportes Recoleta	23	(1)
2021–2022	Deportes Temuco	1	(0)
2022	General Velásquez	3	(0)
2023	Atlético Pueblonuevo	10	(0)
2023–2024	Formentera B	10	(1)
2024–2025	Rosetana	–	(–)
2025	San Antonio Unido	8	(0)
- * Club domestic league appearances and goals as of 31 December 2025

Diego Arturo Martín Bravo (born 28 September 1999) is a Chilean footballer who plays as a centre-back and can also be deployed as a defensive midfielder. He has competed in the Chilean Segunda División and Primera B, and later played in Spain’s Tercera Federación.

== Career ==
Martín was developed in the youth system of Universidad Católica, where he trained within the club’s senior environment before continuing his career in the Chilean professional leagues.

In 2019, he joined Deportes Recoleta, competing in the Segunda División Profesional. During the 2020 season, he featured regularly in league matches and appeared in the starting line-up on multiple occasions.

On 4 January 2021, Martín scored his first professional goal in a league match away to Fernández Vial, equalising in the second half. Recoleta were ultimately defeated 2-1.

Ahead of the 2021 season, Martín moved to Primera B after joining Deportes Temuco. His spell at the club included limited first-team appearances in league competition.

In 2022, he returned to the Segunda División with General Velásquez, where he continued to play as a defender during the second half of the season.

In early 2023, Martín moved abroad to Spain and joined Atlético Pueblonuevo, competing in the Tercera Federación and being known as Arturo. During the 2022 - 2023 campaign, he appeared in league fixtures and was included in matchday line-ups in national-level coverage of the competition. In the second half of 2023, he switched to Formentera B in the Regional Preferente de Ibiza/Formentera.

Back to Chile, Martín played for San Antonio Unido.
