= Marabella North Secondary School =

School in Trinidad and Tobago

Marabella North Secondary School is a government-run, public school in Trinidad located at the 1¼ mile Guaracara-Tarouba mark. Since its inception, the school has taken part in many curricular activities and is a good schooling facility. The school is a seven-year institution where students graduate up to fifth form level and may opt to do Form 6 (Caribbean Advanced Proficiency Examinations, A levels) at their own request.

The school can boast of its seven scholarship winners, Marabella North Secondary has been exceptional in many co curricular activities such as Sanfest and RBC Young leaders.
