= Sir Solomon Hochoy Highway =

Highway in Trinidad and Tobago

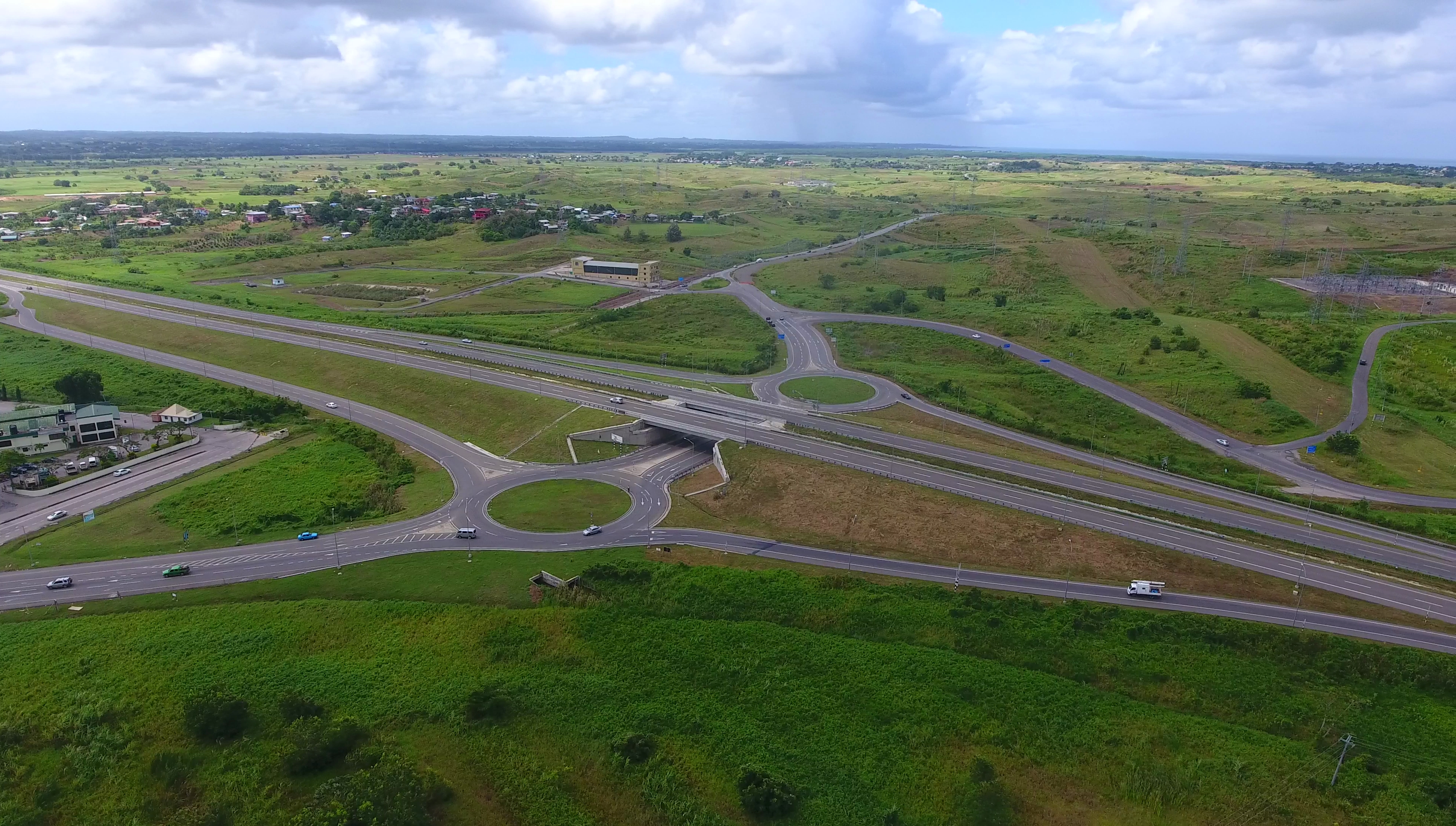

Route information
- Length: 51.2 km (31.8 mi)
- Existed: 1970s–present

Major junctions
- North end: Chaguanas
- South end: Gandhi Village, Debe

Location
- Country: Trinidad and Tobago
- Major cities: Chaguanas, Couva, San Fernando, Penal (soon) and Point Fortin

Highway system
- Transport in Trinidad and Tobago

The Sir Solomon Hochoy Highway, sometimes referred to as SHH, is the major north–south highway on the island of Trinidad, in Trinidad and Tobago. It runs for 51.2 km (31.8 mi).

It connects Chaguanas with Gandhi Village, Debe. It meets the Uriah Butler Highway at Chaguanas.

The highway was named for Sir Solomon Hochoy, the first Caribbean-born Governor of Trinidad and Tobago and the first Governor General of Trinidad and Tobago. Originally constructed as a two-lane highway in the early 1970s, it was expanded to a four-lane dual carriageway in the late 1970s.

== Description ==
=== Route ===
The first segment of the Sir Solomon Hochoy Highway begins at Chaguanas, where traffic joins the Uriah Butler Highway. The highway begins as a four lane expressway at the Southern Main Road interchange in Downtown Chaguanas. It then runs past Brentwood/Edinburgh 500 with access from the southbound lane. After Chaguanas, the highway continues past Chase Village and then Freeport, both accessed by interchanges. At Couva, a more advanced interchange provides access to Balmain, Preysal, Downtown Couva and the Point Lisas Industrial Estate via Rivulet Road and Gran Couva. After Couva, the highway continues south through a sparsely settled hilly area before meeting Cedar Hill Road, providing access to Claxton Bay and Tortuga. It then passes the community of Macaulay, with partial access, and then Gasparillo with an interchange at Bonne Aventure Road.

As the highway nears San Fernando, it passes the Brian Lara Cricket Academy and Gasparillo Bypass Road, before providing access to Tarouba and the San Fernando Bypass at the Tarouba Link Road interchange. Further south and on the newest section of the highway, the Naparima Mayaro Road bridges over the highway just before the Corinth Interchange, which provides access to Corinth, Pleasantville, Cocoyea and Downtown San Fernando. The Golconda Interchange provides access to Golconda and La Romain via the Golconda Connector Road. After San Fernando, the first segment of the highway comes to an end soon after passing the Debe interchange, and terminates at a temporary roundabout upon meeting Gandhi Village Road.

The second continuous section of the highway is known as the Archibald-De Leon Highway. It begins at an interchange with the South Trunk Road at Mon Desir and runs until La Brea, where it diverts to the Southern Main Road before the highway restarts at Dump Road and continues to Point Fortin.

=== Features ===
For its entire length, the highway is a four-lane expressway that is entirely grade separated with the exception of the temporary southern terminus. The speed limit on the entire route is 100 kilometers per hour. It can be considered the most modern highway in the country and is up to international freeway standards.

== Exit list ==
The following table lists the major junctions along the Sir Solomon Hochoy Highway. The entire route is located in Trinidad.

Region	Location	Km	Mile	Exit	Destinations	Notes
Chaguanas		15.6	9.7	—	Uriah Butler Highway – Port of Spain, Chaguanas, Arima – Piarco International Airport	Northern terminus; Continuation from Chaguanas. Kilometer-based exit numbers continue from the Uriah Butler Highway
Chaguanas		16.2	10.1	12	Southern Main Road, Factory Road	Access from SHH northbound only (Exit only)
Chaguanas		16.4	10.2	13	Edinburgh Boulevard	Access from SHH southbound only
Couva–Tabaquite–Talparo	Chase Village	19.2	11.9	14	Connector Road	
Couva–Tabaquite–Talparo	Freeport	21.8	13.5	15	Mission Road	
Couva–Tabaquite–Talparo	Freeport	23.0	14.3	16	Freeport Parallel Access Road, Calcutta Road #1	Access from SHH southbound only
Couva–Tabaquite–Talparo	Couva	25.7	16.0	17	Ato Boldon Stadium	Access to SHH northbound only.
Couva–Tabaquite–Talparo	Couva	26.5	16.5	18	Couva Main Road, Rivulet Road – Camden Airfield	
Couva–Tabaquite–Talparo	Couva	27.7	17.2	19	– Couva Hospital	Southbound access to the Couva Hospital and Multi-purpose Training Facility (Exit Only)
Couva–Tabaquite–Talparo	Couva	28.4	17.6	20	Indian Trail Road	Overpass to be upgraded to an interchange
Couva–Tabaquite–Talparo	Claxton Bay	32.2	20.0	21	Cedar Hill Road	
Couva–Tabaquite–Talparo	Claxton Bay	33.1	20.6	22	Macaulay Road	Southbound exit and northbound entrance
Couva–Tabaquite–Talparo	Gasparillo	38.4	23.9	23	Bonne Aventure Road	
Princes Town	Gasparillo	39.4	24.5	24	Gasparillo Bypass Road	Access from SHH southbound only
San Fernando		41.2	25.6	25	Tarouba Link Road	
San Fernando		43.8	27.2	26	Corinth Road – San Fernando General Hospital	
San Fernando		45.5	28.3	27	Golconda Connector Road	
Penal–Debe	Debe	49.7	30.9	28	S.S. Erin Road	
Penal–Debe	Debe	51.2	31.8	29	Debe Bunsee Trace	Southern temporary terminus
Penal–Debe	Penal			30	Future Link Road to S.S. Erin Road.	Future interchange on new freeway to be constructed
Siparia	Siparia			31	Future Link Road to Siparia Old Road	Future interchange on new freeway to be constructed
Siparia	Fyzabad			32	Future Link Road to Oropouche Rd	Future interchange on new freeway to be constructed
Siparia	Mon Desir	67.3	41.8	33	South Trunk Road	Interchange under construction for new freeway to be constructed
Siparia	Mon Desir	67.9	42.2	34	Mon Desir Delhi Road	
Siparia	Rousillac	70.5	43.8	35	Grants Road	
Siparia	La Brea	74.4	46.2	36	La Brea Connector Road	
Point Fortin		77.5	48.2	37	Maxime Street	
Point Fortin		80	50	38	Southern Main Road – Point Fortin Hospital	Disconnected southern terminus
1.000 mi = 1.609 km; 1.000 km = 0.621 mi: Closed/former; Concurrency terminus; Incomplete access; Tolled; Route transition; Unopened

== Auxiliary Routes ==
- Connector Road, Chase Village
- Rivulet Road
- Gasparillo Bypass Road
- Tarouba Link Road
- Golconda Connector Road
- La Brea Connector Road

== Upgrades and Extensions ==
In 2001, work commenced on making the highway bypass San Fernando completely. This work was completed in 2003. Further work was done in 2013 extending the highway to Debe while en route to Point Fortin. Plans are underway to extend the highway to Point Fortin. The highway's current extended route will be discontiguous from the main route as the Debe to Mon Desir segment of the highway is not currently planned to be constructed by the current administration.

Numerous upgrades to the interchanges along the highway occurred in recent years, most notably in San Fernando at the Tarouba and Golconda interchanges and in Couva at the Couva/Preysal interchange. Plans are in place for two new interchanges in Chaguanas at Endeavour and Brentwood as well as to upgrade the interchange at Monroe Road. There are also plans to add an additional lane on both the northbound and southbound carriageways from Chaguanas to Chase Village making that segment of the highway a six-lane dual carriageway. This plan was later revised and now the highway will be widened to a six-lane dual carriageway from Chaguanas to San Fernando and this will be done in 2 Phases: From Chaguanas to Couva and afterwards from Couva to San Fernando.
