= Cipero Tramway =

Railway in Trinidad and Tobago

The Cipero Tramway (also known as the Cipero Tramroad) was a railway connecting the town of Princes Town (then known as the Mission of Savana Grande) and San Fernando in south Trinidad. Built in the 1850s, it was eventually absorbed into the Trinidad Government Railway in the 1920s.

== History ==
The Trinidad Railway Company was established in 1846 with the goal of building a railway, but were unable to raise money for construction. The first operational railway in Trinidad was the Cipero Tramway, which began operations between Princes Town and San Fernando in 1859. (Note: Richard Charan and Allen Morrison give a starting date of 1839, but Michael Anthony and Daniel Hart give 1859 as the start date, and Anne Hardgrove cites minutes of the Cipero Tramroad Preliminary Proceedings from 1857.)

The Cipero Tramway was built to connect sugar plantations and mills in south Trinidad with the port in San Fernando. In response to a petition from sugarcane planters, the Legislative Council established a committee to plan and build the tramway. A budget of £29,160 was established, including an £8,400 levy on planters whose estates would be serviced by the tramway, and at least £8,000 from government funds, with the remainder being borrowed from the Colonial Bank. The driving force behind the project was William Eccles, a wealthy Scottish planter.

The tramway opened on Saturday March 5, 1859. It was horse-drawn and used to transported sugar cane and other produce. In response to demand from the public, passenger service was added, and beginning in 1866 the tramway added mail delivery between San Fernando and Princes Town. Horse-drawn trams were replaced by a steam locomotive in 1864.

After the Trinidad Government Railway acquired the Guaracara tram line and began expanding it to handle trains and extended it to Princes Town, the Colonial Company and the Cipero Tramway Commissioners objected, claiming it was "unfair competition, interfering with their private rights and unjustly depreciating the value of their line".

In the 1920s the Cipero Tramway was absorbed into the Trinidad Government Railway.

== Route ==
The tramway began in what is now Princes Town. It passed through the village of Sainte Madeleine and entered San Fernando at the Cipero Cross, where the road running south from San Fernando crossed the Cipero River. The point where the tramway crossed the road came to be known as Cross Crossing.

The tramway continued to the embarcadere (improvised shipping wharf) on the Cipero River, where sugar canes were unloaded for shipping, and then continued to Harris Promenade. In 1876 the tramway was extended to King's Wharf in San Fernando.
