= Trinidad Government Railway =

Railway in Trinidad and Tobago

Last Train to San Fernando – Harris Promenade, San Fernando

The Trinidad Government Railway existed between 1876 and 28 December 1968. Originally built to connect Port of Spain with Arima, the railway was extended to Couva in 1880, San Fernando in 1882, Cunapo (now Sangre Grande) in 1897, Tabaquite in 1898, Siparia in 1913 and Rio Claro in 1914.

== Background ==
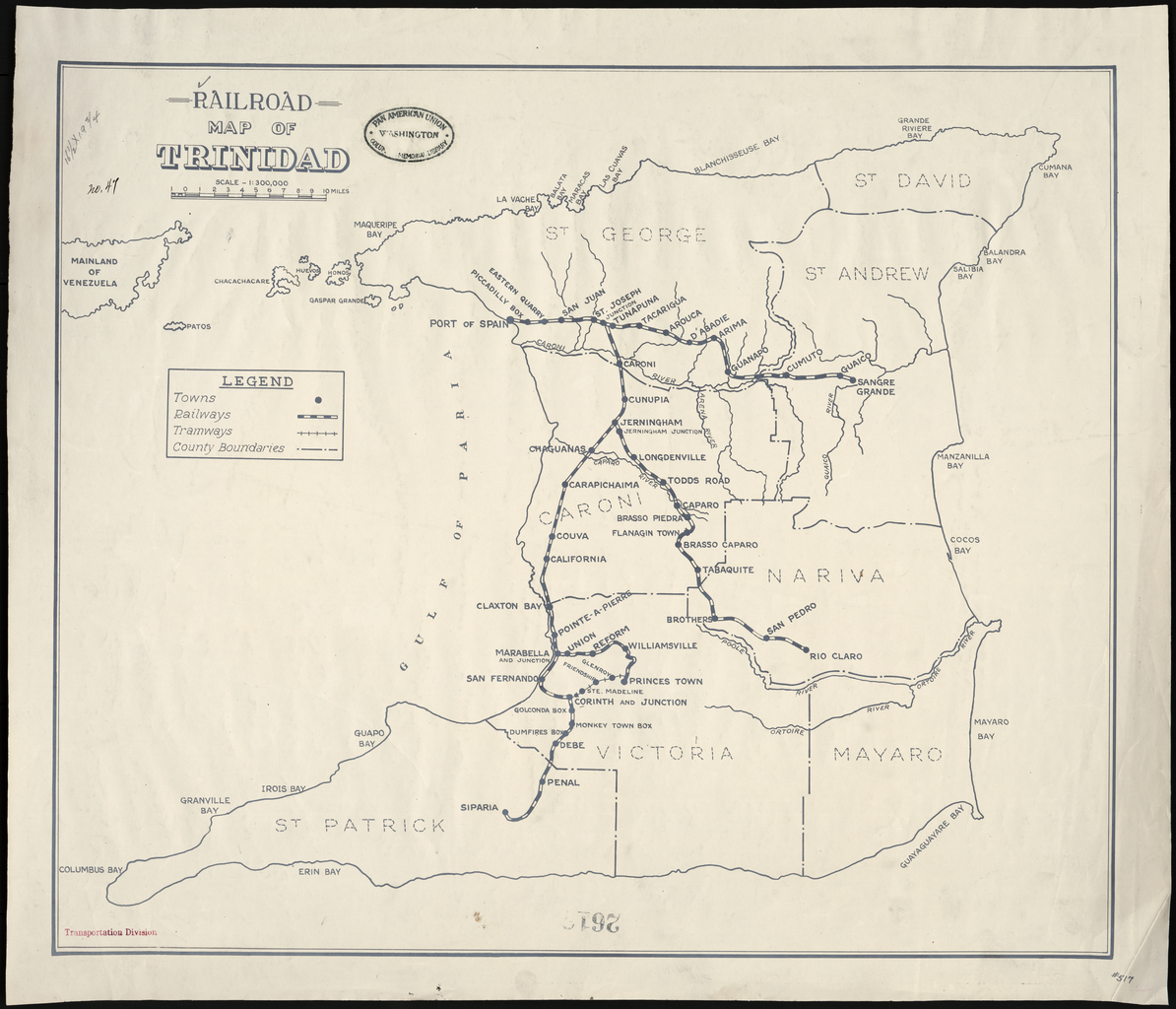
Railroad Map of Trinidad, 1925

The first attempt to establish a railway was a private affair in 1846 by the Trinidad Railway Company. The first operational railway was the Cipero Tramroad, which ran between Mission (Princes Town) and King's Wharf in San Fernando.

The first steam locomotive was the "Forerunner" which was built by Hunslet of Leeds and arrived in 1864.

Railway construction began in the 1870s. The Arima line was completed in 1876, followed by the San Fernando line in 1882.

In 1878, as part of the expansion toward San Fernando, the government purchased the Guaracara tram line from the Colonial Company. The tram line, which ran between Union Embarcadere on the Guaracara River and Garth Estate, was expanded by the TGR to carry trains, and extended to Princes Town in 1884.

The railway line was extended to Sangre Grande in 1897 and Cunupia-Tabaquite in 1898. In the 1920s the Cipero Tramway was absorbed into the TGR.

== Overview ==
At its greatest extent, the railway covered 173 km (107 mi).

After the end of World War I, the appearance of automobiles led to changes that resulted in closure of the railway between April 1953 and 28 December 1968.

== Statistics ==
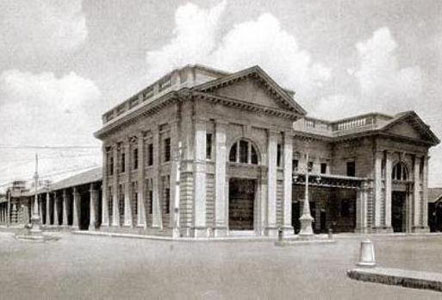
Port of Spain railway station, 1924

The TGR operated about 640 km (400 mi) of 1,435 mm (4 ft 8 1/2 in) standard gauge track.

By the end of 1921 the company owned 37 steam locomotives, 105 coaches and 738 goods wagons. In 1931, a Sentinel-Cammell twin articulated steam railcar was acquired. By 1936, there were 29 locomotives, 1 railcar, 82 coaches and 925 goods wagons.

== Stations ==
The principal stations, termini and junctions were:

- Port of Spain – terminus, capital and port
  - Tunapuna – junction in east
  - Sangre Grande – terminus in east
- Tunapuna – junction in east
  - Chaguanas – junction in north central
  - Rio Claro – terminus in south east
- Chaguanas – junction in north central
  - Couva – station in west central
  - Gasparillo – station
  - Princes Town – terminus
  - Claxton Bay – station in south central
  - Marabella – junction in south west
  - San Fernando – station in south west
- Penal – station in south
- Siparia – terminus in south

== New railway ==
On 11 April 2008 the Trinitrain consortium was chosen to plan and build two new Trinidad Rapid Railway passenger lines. This plan was cancelled in 2010.
