= Gasparillo =

Coordinates: 10°19′N 61°25′W

- settlement
- Interactive map of Gasparillo
- Country: Trinidad and Tobago
- Region: Couva-Tabaquite-Talparo

Population (2011)
  - Total: 16,426
- Time zone: UTC−4 (AST)
- Postal code: 57xxxx
- Area code: 868

Gasparillo is a settlement in southern Trinidad. It lies east of Pointe-à-Pierre and northeast of San Fernando. The population is 16,426. The name Gasparillo is applied not only to Gasparillo area, but also the surrounding communities including Bonne Aventure, Reform and Whiteland. Trinidadians do not use Spanish sounds when saying Gasparillo. Correct local pronunciation is "gas-PARR-ri-low." Gasparillo is administrated by Couva–Tabaquite–Talparo Regional Corporation and Princes Town Regional Corporation.

Gasparillo owes much of its size to its proximity to the Petrotrin oil refinery at Pointe-à-Pierre. It also provides the only publicly accessible route from the Sir Solomon Hochoy Highway to the town of Marabella and the Manny Ramjohn Stadium, named for Olympian, Scout Leader and long-time Gasparillo resident, Manny Ramjohn.

The Gasparillo Chamber of Commerce was launched on 8 September 2018.
