= South Oropouche =

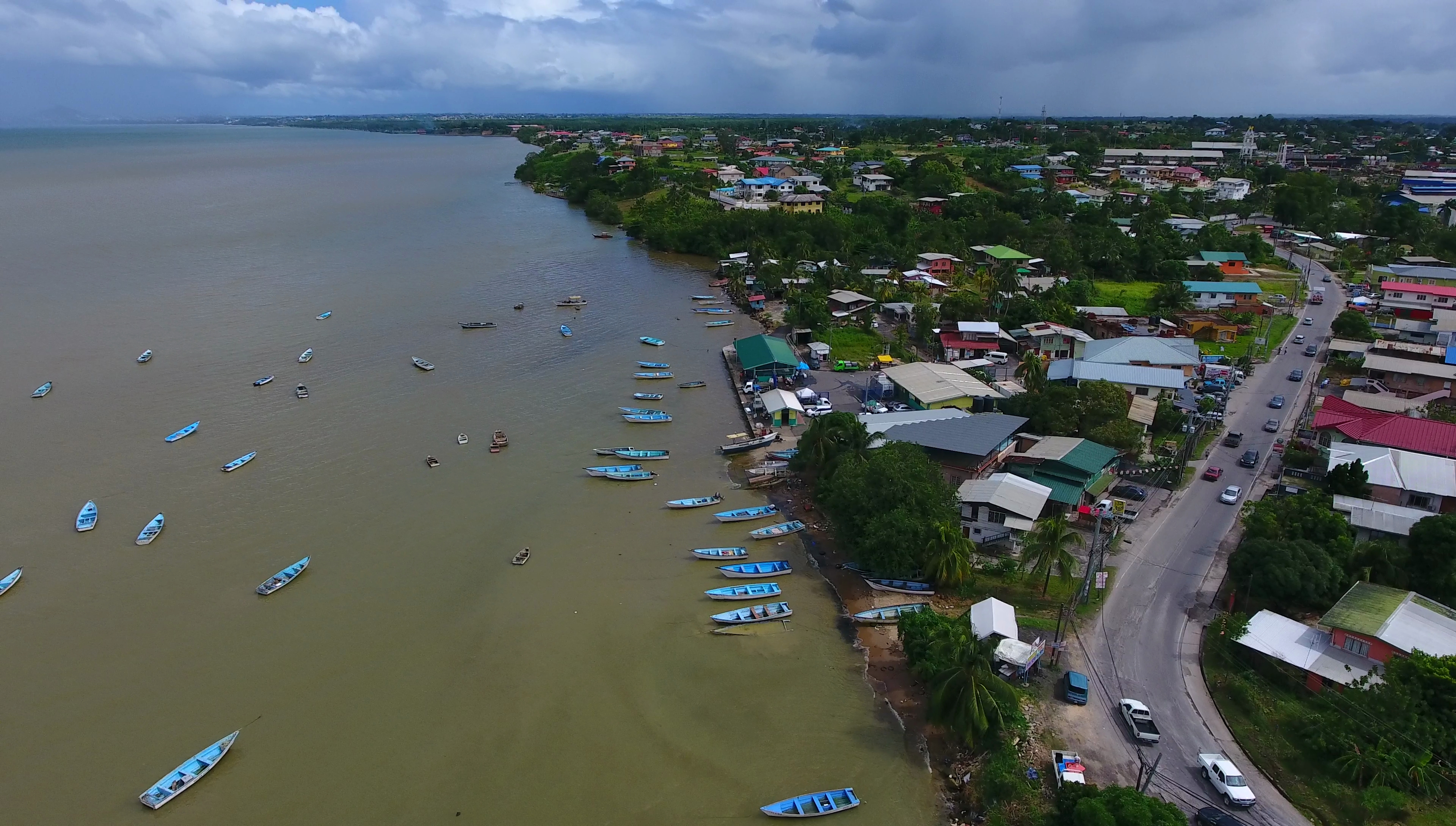
- South Oropouche
- Interactive map of South Oropouche
- Coordinates: 10°13′N 061°33′W
- Country: Trinidad and Tobago
- Region: Siparia
- Elevation: 3 m (9.8 ft)

South Oropouche is a community in Trinidad and Tobago. It is at sea level. There is an archaeological site at St John's Road, South Oropouche. Dow Village is in South Oropouche.
