= Trinidad Rapid Railway =

Proposed railway in Trinidad and Tobago

The Trinidad Rapid Railway is a proposed passenger railway system in Trinidad and Tobago.

== Project ==
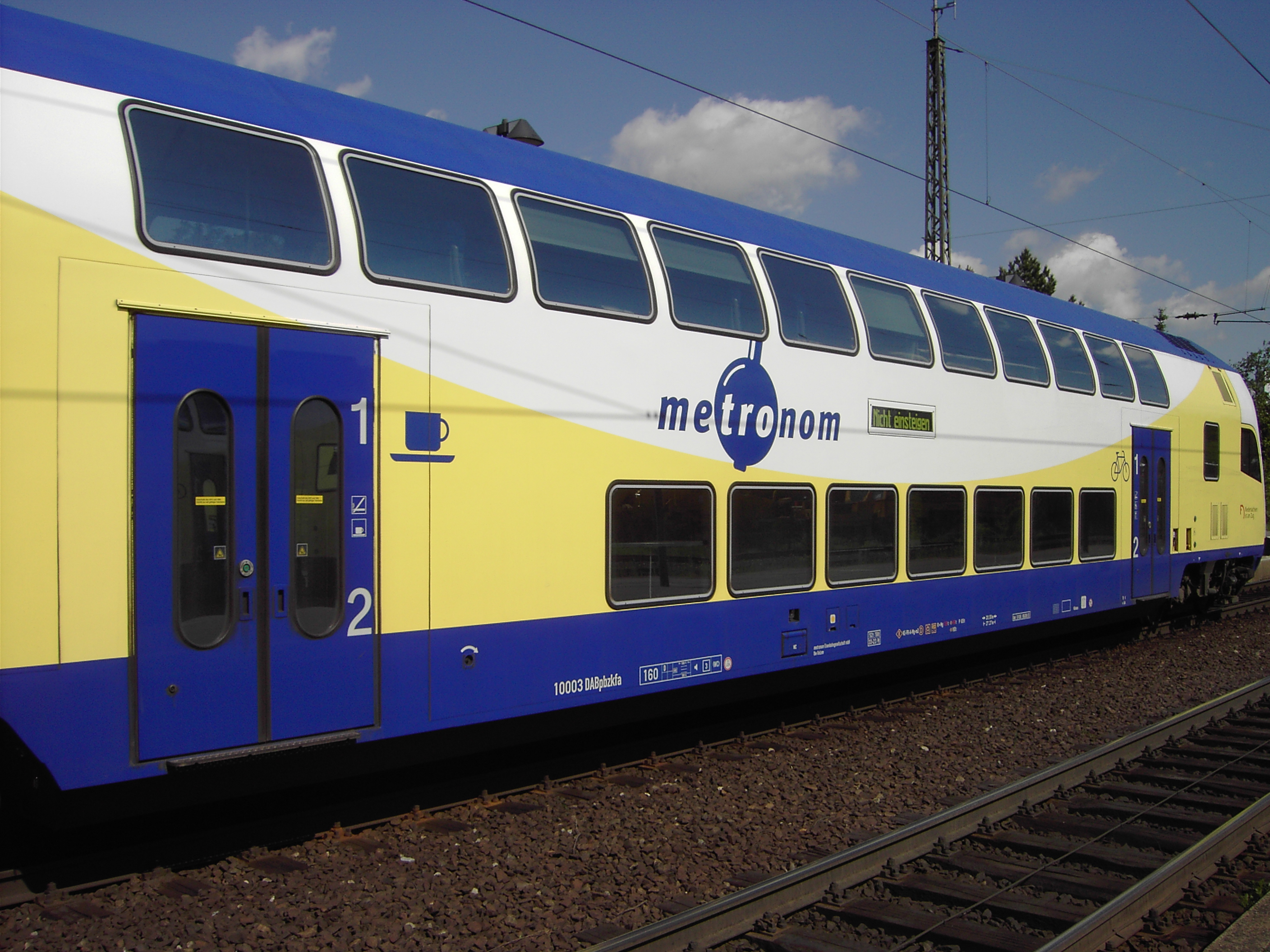
Example of a double decker passenger car, proposed to be used for Trinidad Rapid Railway

On 11 April 2008, the TriniTrain consortium of Alstom Transport SA, Alstom T&T Ltd, Bouygues Construction and RATP Développement announced it had been selected by the government to plan and build two new passenger railway lines in Trinidad. WSP was advising the government on the routes.

In a meeting with then Prime Minister Patrick Manning on 28 April 2009, Minister of Works & Transport, Colm Imbert said construction of the Trinidad Rapid Railway would commence in mid-2010, with the first train rolling out of the capital city approximately 36 to 39 months later as detailed by the National Infrastructure Development Company Limited (NIDCO).

In September 2010, the project was scrapped.

In 2015, under the Administration of the new Prime Minister, Dr. Rowley, the project was reinitiated. However, in 2016, the project was scrapped again due to falling oil prices affecting the economy of Trinidad and Tobago.

== Lines ==
- University of the West Indies in St Augustine - San Fernando 50 km (north-south)
- Westmoorings - Sangre Grande 54 km (west-east)

The lines were planned to be constructed simultaneously in five sections, Westmoorings through Port of Spain to St Augustine, St Augustine to Arima, and Arima to Sangre Grande, Port of Spain to Chaguanas, and Chaguanas to San Fernando.

Consultants hired by the government investigated the alternative of taking the railway underground because of the expense of the acquisition of land, building elevated platforms and the congestion at the interchange taking traffic in and out of the capital.

== See also ==
- Transport in Trinidad and Tobago
- List of tram and light-rail transit systems
- Trinidad Government Railway - closed 1968
