= Trinidad and Tobago =

Country in the Caribbean

Republic of Trinidad and Tobago
- Flag Coat of arms
- Motto: "Together we aspire, together we achieve"
- Anthem: "Forged from the Love of Liberty"
- Capital: Port of Spain; 10°40′N 61°30′W
- Largest city: Chaguanas; 10°31′N 61°24′W
- Official languages: English
- Vernacular languages: Trinidadian Creole; Tobagonian Creole
- Other languages: See Languages of Trinidad and Tobago
- Ethnic groups (2011): 35.4% Indian; 34.2% African; 22.8% Mixed; 7.6% Dougla; 1.3% other (Note: incl. 0.59% European (other than Portuguese), 0.3% Chinese, 0.1% Indigenous, 0.08% Arabs, 0.06% Portuguese, 0.1% others (incld. Latin Americans)); 6.2% unspecified
- Religion (2025 est.): 63.4% Christianity; 24.3% Hinduism; 6.4% Islam; 3.6% other (Note: incl. 1.4% Orisha-Shango/Vodunu-Rada/Rastafari/other African diaspora religions, 1.2% Baháʼí, 0.4% Chinese folk religion, 0.3% Buddhism, 0.01% Judaism); 2.3% irreligion
- Demonyms: Trinidadian and Tobagonian; Trini or Trinbagonian (colloquial)
- Government: Unitary parliamentary republic
  - President: Christine Kangaloo
  - Prime Minister: Kamla Persad-Bissessar
  - Chief Justice: Ronnie Boodoosingh
- Legislature: Parliament
  - Upper house: Senate
  - Lower house: House of Representatives

Independence from the United Kingdom
  - Province of the West Indies Federation: 3 January 1958 – 14 January 1962
  - Independence: 31 August 1962
  - Joined the Caribbean Community at the Treaty of Chaguaramas: 1 August 1973
  - Republic: 1 August 1976 (Note: Despite becoming a republic on 1 August, Republic Day is celebrated as a public holiday on 24 September because this is the date when the first Parliament met under the new Republican Constitution.)

Area
  - Total: 5,131 km^{2} (1,981 sq mi) (164th)
  - Water (%): negligible

Population
  - 2025 estimate: 1,512,779 (154th)
  - Density: 294/km^{2} (761.5/sq mi) (34th)
- GDP (PPP): 2023 estimate
  - Total: ▲$43.658 billion (126th)
  - Per capita: ▲$30,718 (58th)
- GDP (nominal): 2023 estimate
  - Total: ▼$27.887 billion (107th)
  - Per capita: ▼$19,621 (47th)
- Gini (2012): 39.0 medium inequality
- HDI (2023): ▲0.807 very high (72nd)
- Currency: Trinidad and Tobago dollar (TTD)
- Time zone: UTC-4 (AST)
- Date format: dd/mm/yyyy
- Calling code: +1
- ISO 3166 code: TT
- Internet TLD: .tt

Trinidad and Tobago, (Note: Pronounced /ˈtrɪnɪdæd ... təˈbeɪɡoʊ/, /- toʊ-/, TRIN-ih-dad ... tə-BAY-goh, - toh-) officially the Republic of Trinidad and Tobago, is the southernmost archipelagic country in the Caribbean, comprising the main islands of Trinidad and Tobago, along with several smaller islets. The capital city is Port of Spain, while its largest and most populous municipality is Chaguanas. Trinidad and Tobago comprises the southernmost islands of the Caribbean eastern islands chain, and it is close to the continent of South America, being north to northeast of Venezuela and northwest of Guyana.

Trinidad and Tobago is located six nautical miles (11 km; 6.9 mi) north to northeast off the coast of Venezuela, 70 nautical miles (130 km; 81 mi) south of Grenada, and 155 nautical miles (287 km; 178 mi) southwest of Barbados. Indigenous peoples inhabited Trinidad for centuries prior to Spanish colonisation, following the arrival of Christopher Columbus in 1498. Spanish governor José María Chacón surrendered the island to a British fleet under Ralph Abercromby's command in 1797. Trinidad and Tobago were ceded to Britain in 1802 under the Treaty of Amiens as separate states and unified in 1889. Trinidad and Tobago obtained independence in 1962, and became a republic in 1976.

Unlike most Caribbean countries and territories, which rely heavily on tourism, the economy is primarily industrial, based on large reserves of oil and gas. The country sees fewer hurricanes than most of the Caribbean because it is farther south.

Trinidad and Tobago is well known for its African and Indian cultures, reflected in its large and famous Carnival, Diwali, and Hosay celebrations, as well as being the birthplace of the steelpan, the limbo, and musical styles such as calypso, soca, rapso, chutney, and chutney soca.

== Toponymy ==
Historian E. L. Joseph claimed that Trinidad's Indigenous name was Cairi or "Land of the Humming Bird", derived from an Arawakan name for hummingbird, ierèttê or yerettê. However, other authors dispute this etymology with some claiming that cairi does not mean hummingbird (tukusi or tucuchi being suggested as the correct word) and some claiming that kairi, or iere, simply means island. Christopher Columbus renamed it "La Isla de la Trinidad" ("The Island of the Trinity"), fulfilling a vow made before setting out on his third voyage of exploration. Tobago's cigar-like shape, or the use of tobacco by the native people, may have given it its Spanish name (tabaco, tavaco, tobacco) and possibly some of its other Indigenous names, such as Aloubaéra (black conch) and Urupaina (big snail), although the English pronunciation is /təˈbeɪɡoʊ/. Indo-Trinidadians called the island Chinidat, Chinidad, or Chinitat which translated to the "land of sugar". The usage of the term goes back to the 19th century when recruiters in India would call the island Chinidat as a way of luring workers into indentureship on the sugar plantations.

== History ==
=== Indigenous peoples ===
Trinidad and Tobago were originally settled by Indigenous peoples migrating from South America. The earliest known settlement is at Banwari Trace in southwestern Trinidad, dating back to approximately 5000 BCE, making it the oldest pre-Columbian archaeological site in the Caribbean. The site has yielded artifacts and the remains of "Banwari Man," the oldest human skeleton found in the region.

At the time of European contact, Trinidad was inhabited by various Indigenous groups, including Arawakan-speaking peoples such as the Nepoya and Shebaya, and Cariban-speaking groups like the Yao. Tobago was inhabited by the Kalina (mainland Caribs).

=== European colonisation ===
Christopher Columbus was the first European to see Trinidad, on his third voyage to the Americas in 1498. He also reported seeing Tobago on the distant horizon, naming it Bellaforma, but did not land on the island.

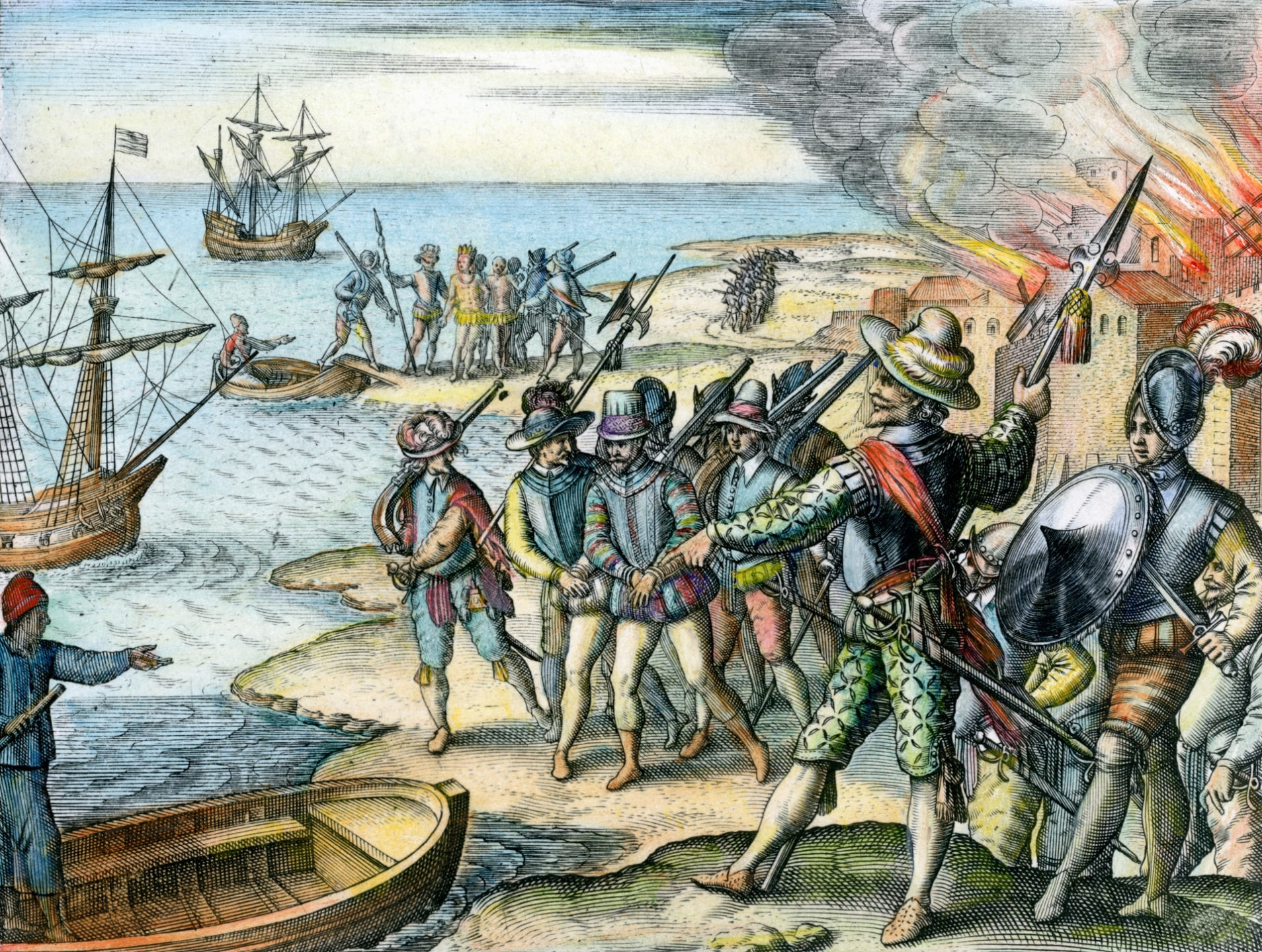
English pirate Walter Raleigh raiding Spanish settlement in Trinidad in 1595

In the 1530s Antonio de Sedeño, a Spanish soldier intent on conquering the island of Trinidad, landed on its southwest coast with a small army of men, intending to subdue the Indigenous population of the island. Sedeño and his men fought the native peoples on many occasions, and subsequently built a fort. The next few decades were generally spent in warfare with the native peoples, until in 1592, the "Cacique" (native chief) Wannawanare (also known as Guanaguanare) granted the area around modern Saint Joseph to Domingo de Vera e Ibargüen, and withdrew to another part of the island. The settlement of San José de Oruña was later established by Antonio de Berrío on this land in 1592. Shortly thereafter the English pirate Walter Raleigh arrived in Trinidad on 22 March 1595 in search of the long-rumoured "El Dorado" ("City of Gold") supposedly located in South America. He attacked San José, captured and interrogated Antonio de Berrío, and obtained much information from him and from the Cacique Topiawari; Raleigh then went on his way, and Spanish authority was restored.

Meanwhile, there were numerous attempts by European powers to settle Tobago during the 1620–40s, with the Dutch, English and Couronians (people from the Duchy of Courland and Semigallia, now part of Latvia) all attempting to colonise the island with little success. From 1654 the Dutch and Courlanders managed to gain a more secure foothold, later joined by several hundred French settlers. A plantation economy developed based on the production of sugar, indigo and rum, worked by large numbers of African slaves who soon came to vastly outnumber the European colonists. Large numbers of forts were constructed as Tobago became a source of contention between France, Netherlands and Britain, with the island changing hands some 31 times prior to 1814, a situation exacerbated by widespread piracy. The British managed to hold Tobago from 1762 to 1781, whereupon it was captured by the French, who ruled until 1793 when Britain re-captured the island.

The 17th century on Trinidad passed largely without major incident, but sustained attempts by the Spaniards to control and rule over the Indigenous population was often fiercely resisted. In 1687 the Catholic Catalan Capuchin friars were given responsibility for the conversions of the indigenous people of Trinidad and the Guianas. They founded several missions in Trinidad, supported and richly funded by the state, which also granted encomienda right to them. One such mission was Santa Rosa de Arima, established in 1689, when Indigenous people from the former encomiendas of Tacarigua and Arauca (Arouca) were relocated further west. Escalating tensions between the Spaniards and Indigenous people culminated in violence in 1699, when Indigenous people in the San Rafael encomienda rebelled and killed several priests, attacked a church, and killed the Spanish governor José de León y Echales. Among those killed in the governor's party was Juan Mazien de Sotomayor, missionary priest to the Nepuyo villages of Caura, Tacarigua and Arauca. The Spanish retaliated severely, slaughtering hundreds of native peoples in an event that became known as the Arena massacre. As a result of continuing Spanish slave-raiding, and the devastating impact of introduced disease to which they had no immunity, the native population was virtually wiped out by the end of the following century.

During this period Trinidad was an island province belonging the Audiencia of Santo Domingo of the Viceroyalty of New Spain, together with Central America, present-day Mexico and what would later become the southwestern United States. In 1757 the capital was moved from San José de Oruña to Puerto de España (modern Port of Spain) following several pirate attacks. However the Spanish never made any concerted effort to colonise the islands; Trinidad in this period was still mostly forest, populated by a few Spaniards with a handful of slaves and a few thousand Indigenous people. Indeed, the population in 1777 was only 1,400, and Spanish colonisation in Trinidad remained tenuous.

==== Influx of French settlers ====
In 1777, the captain general of Venezuela Luis de Unzaga 'le Conciliateur', married to a French Creole, allowed free trade in Trinidad, attracting French settlers and its economy improved notably. Since Trinidad was considered underpopulated, Roume de St. Laurent, a Frenchman living in Grenada, was able to obtain a Cédula de Población from the Spanish king Charles III on 4 November 1783. A Cédula de Población had previously been granted in 1776 by the king, but had not shown results, and therefore the new Cédula was more generous. It granted free land and tax exemption for 10 years to Roman Catholic foreign settlers who were willing to swear allegiance to the King of Spain. The land grant was 30 fanegas (13 hectares/32 acres) for each free man, woman and child and half of that for each slave that they brought with them. The Spanish sent a new governor, José María Chacón, to implement the terms of the new cédula.

The Cédula was issued only a few years before the French Revolution. During that period of upheaval, French planters with their slaves, free coloureds and mulattos from the neighbouring islands of Martinique, Saint Lucia, Grenada, Guadeloupe and Dominica migrated to Trinidad, where they established an agriculture-based economy (sugar and cocoa). These new immigrants established local communities in Blanchisseuse, Champs Fleurs, Paramin, Cascade, Carenage and Laventille.

As a result, Trinidad's population jumped to over 15,000 by the end of 1789, and by 1797 the population of Port of Spain had increased from under 3,000 to 10,422 in just five years, with a varied population of mixed race individuals, Spaniards, Africans, French republican soldiers, retired pirates and French nobility. The total population of Trinidad was 17,718, of which 2,151 were of European ancestry, 4,476 were "free blacks and people of colour", 10,009 were enslaved people and 1,082 Indigenous people. The sparse settlement and slow rate of population-increase during Spanish rule (and even later during British rule) made Trinidad one of the less populated colonies of the West Indies, with the least developed plantation infrastructure.

=== British rule ===
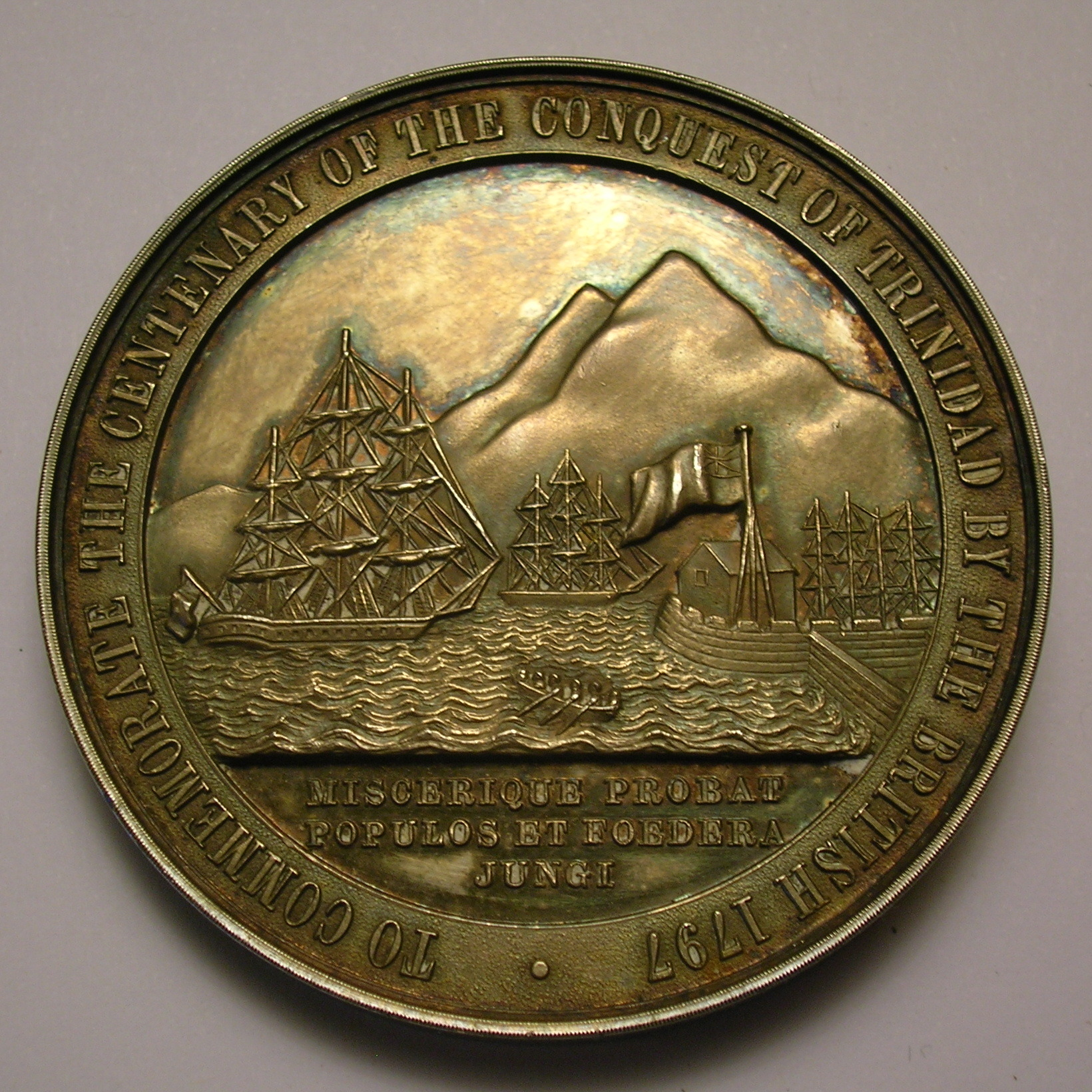
An 1897 medallion showing the capture of Trinidad and Tobago by the British in 1797

The British had begun to take a keen interest in Trinidad, and in 1797 a British force led by General Sir Ralph Abercromby launched an invasion of Trinidad. His squadron sailed through the Bocas and anchored off the coast of Chaguaramas. Seriously outnumbered, Chacón decided to capitulate to the British without fighting. Trinidad thus became a British crown colony, with a largely French-speaking population and Spanish laws. British rule was later formalised under the Treaty of Amiens (1802). The colony's first British governor was Thomas Picton, however his heavy-handed approach to enforcing British authority, including the use of torture and arbitrary arrest, led to his being recalled.

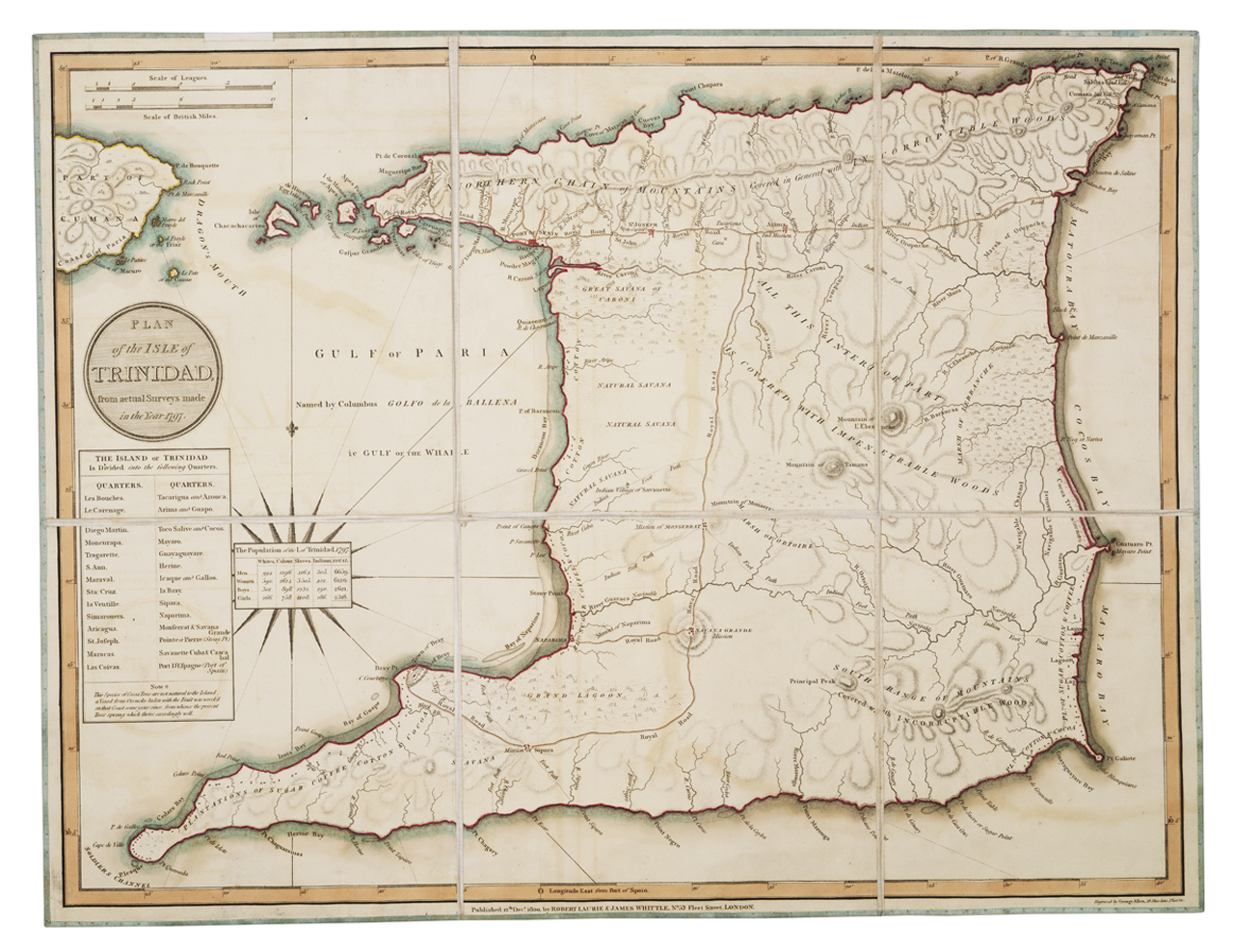
Survey map from 1797 of Trinidad

British rule led to an influx of settlers from the United Kingdom and the British colonies of the Eastern Caribbean. English, Scots, Irish, German and Italian families arrived, as well as some free blacks known as "Merikins" who had fought for Britain in the War of 1812 and were granted land in southern Trinidad. Under British rule, new states were created and the importation of slaves increased, however by this time support for abolitionism had vastly increased and in England the slave trade was under attack.

Slavery was abolished in 1833, after which former slaves served an "apprenticeship" period. In 1837, Daaga, a West African slave raider who had been captured by Portuguese slavers and later rescued by the British navy, was conscripted into the local regiment. Daaga and a group of his compatriots mutinied at the barracks in St Joseph and set out eastward in an attempt to return to their homeland. The mutineers were ambushed by a militia unit just outside the town of Arima. The revolt was crushed at the cost of some 40 dead, and Daaga and two others were later executed at St Joseph. The apprenticeship system ended on 1 August 1838 with full emancipation. An overview of the population statistics in 1838, however, clearly reveals the contrast between Trinidad and its neighbouring islands: upon emancipation of the slaves in 1838, Trinidad had only 17,439 slaves, with 80% of slave owners having enslaved fewer than 10 people each. In contrast, at twice the size of Trinidad, Jamaica had roughly 360,000 slaves.

==== Arrival of Indian indentured labourers ====
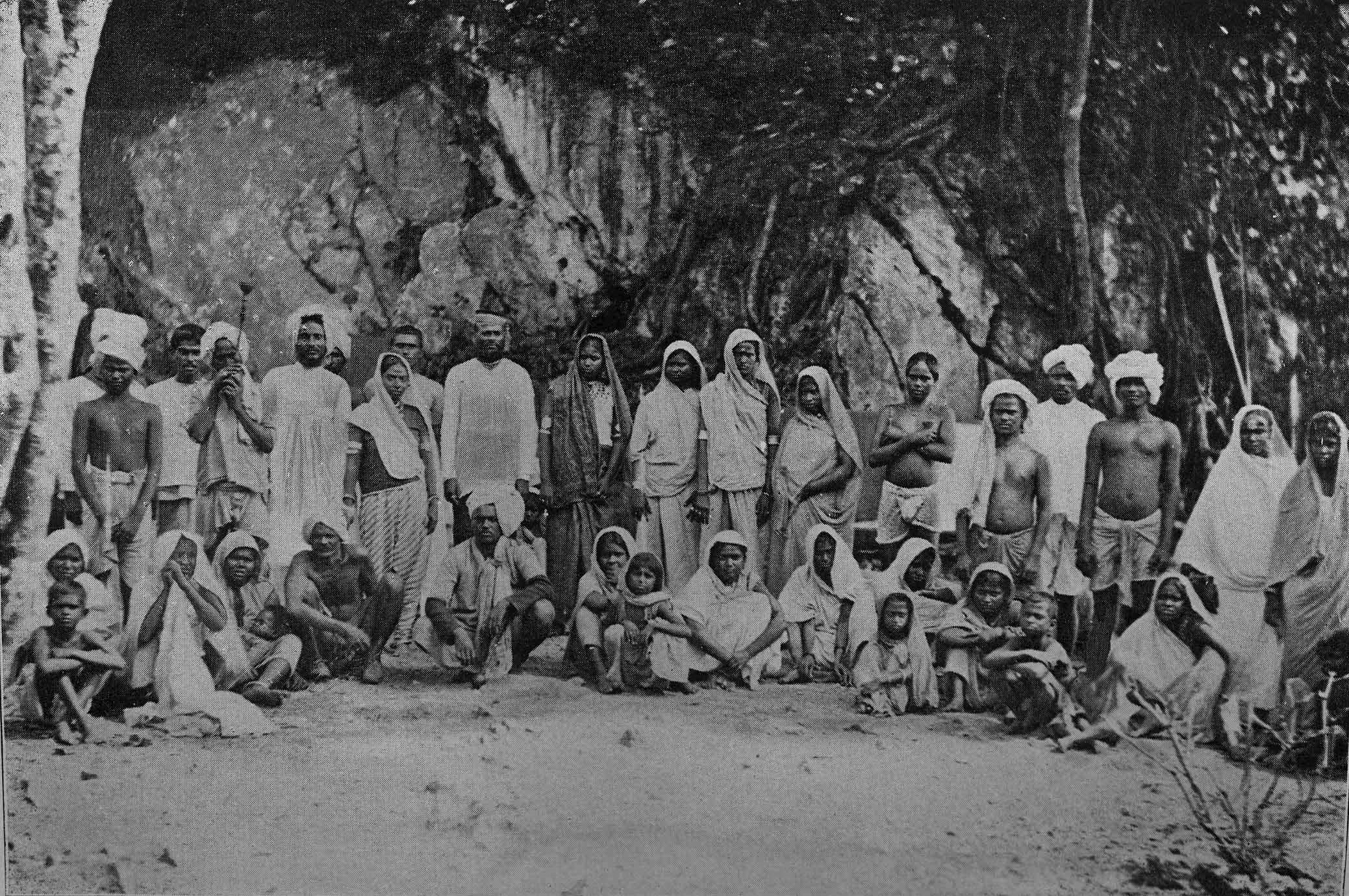
Newly arrived indentured Indian labourers in Trinidad and Tobago

After the African slaves were emancipated, many refused to continue working on the plantations, often moving out to urban areas such as Laventille and Belmont to the east of Port of Spain. As a result, a severe agricultural labour shortage emerged. The British filled this gap by instituting a system of indentureship. Various nationalities were contracted under this system, including Indians, Chinese, and Portuguese. Of these, the East Indians were imported in the largest numbers, starting from 1 May 1845, when 225 Indians were brought in the first ship to Trinidad on the Fatel Razack, a Muslim-owned vessel. Indentureship of the Indians lasted from 1845 to 1917, during which time more than 147,000 Indians came to Trinidad to work on sugarcane plantations.

Indentureship contracts were sometimes exploitative, to such an extent that historians such as Hugh Tinker were to call it "a new system of slavery". Despite these descriptions, it was not truly a new form of slavery, as workers were paid, contracts were finite, and the idea of an individual being another's property had been eliminated when slavery was abolished. In addition, employers of indentured labour had no legal right to flog or whip their workers; the main legal sanction for the enforcement of the indenture laws was prosecution in the courts, followed by fines or (more likely) jail sentences. People were contracted for a period of five years, with a daily wage as low as 25 cents in the early 20th century, and they were guaranteed return passage to India at the end of their contract period. However, coercive means were often used to retain labourers, and the indentureship contracts were soon extended to 10 years from 1854 after the planters complained that they were losing their labour too early. In lieu of the return passage, the British authorities soon began offering portions of land to encourage settlement, and by 1902, more than half of the sugar cane in Trinidad was being produced by independent cane farmers; the majority of which were Indians. Despite the trying conditions experienced under the indenture system, about 90% of the Indian immigrants chose, at the end of their contracted periods of indenture, to make Trinidad their permanent home. Indians entering the colony were also subject to certain crown laws which segregated them from the rest of Trinidad and Tobago's population, such as the requirement that they carry a pass with them if they left the plantations, and that if freed, they carry their "Free Papers" or certificate indicating completion of the indenture period.

Colonial flag of Trinidad and Tobago, 1889–1958

Trinidad and Tobago Act 1887
- Act of Parliament
- Parliament of the United Kingdom
- Long title: An Act to enable Her Majesty by Order in Council to unite the Colonies of Trinidad and Tobago into one Colony.
- Citation: 50 & 51 Vict. c. 44
- Territorial extent: United Kingdom

Dates
- Royal assent: 16 September 1887
- Commencement: 16 September 1887 (Note: The Acts of Parliament (Commencement) Act 1793.)
- Repealed: 18 April 1962
Other legislation
Amends	Saint Vincent, Tobago, and Grenada Constitution Act 1876
Amended by	Statute Law Revision Act 1950
Repealed by	West Indies Act 1962

Status: Repealed

Text of statute as originally enacted

Few Indians settled on Tobago however, and the descendants of African slaves continued to form the majority of the island's population. An ongoing economic slump in the middle-to-late 19th century caused widespread poverty. Discontent erupted into rioting on the Roxborough plantation in 1876, in an event known as the Belmanna Uprising after a policeman who was killed. The British eventually managed to restore control; however, as a result of the disturbances Tobago's Legislative Assembly voted to dissolve itself and the island became a Crown colony in 1877. With the sugar industry in a state of near-collapse and the island no longer profitable, the British attached Tobago to their Trinidad colony in 1889.

==== Early 20th century ====
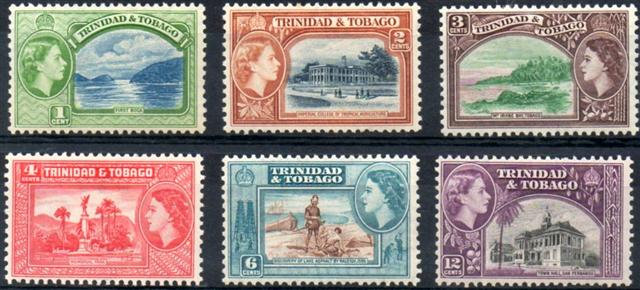
The Queen on 1953 stamps of Trinidad and Tobago

In 1903, a protest against the introduction of new water rates in Port of Spain erupted into rioting; 18 people were shot dead, and the Red House (the government headquarters) was damaged by fire. A local elected assembly with some limited powers was introduced in 1913. Economically Trinidad and Tobago remained a predominantly agricultural colony; alongside sugarcane, the cacao (cocoa) crop also contributed greatly to economic earnings in the late 19th and early 20th centuries.

In November 1919, the dockworkers went on strike over bad management practices, low wages compared to a higher cost of living. Strikebreakers were brought in to keep a minimum of goods moving through the ports. On 1 December 1919, the striking dockworkers rushed the harbour and chased off the strikebreakers. They then proceeded to march on the government buildings in Port of Spain. Other unions and workers, many with the same grievances, joined the dock worker's strike making it a General Strike. Violence broke out and was only put down with help from the sailors of British Naval ship HMS Calcutta. The unity brought upon by the strike was the first time of cooperation between the various ethnic groups of the time. Historian Brinsley Samaroo says that the 1919 strikes "seem to indicate that there was a growing class consciousness after the war and this transcended racial feelings at times."

However, in the 1920s, the collapse of the sugarcane industry, concomitant with the failure of the cocoa industry, resulted in widespread depression among the rural and agricultural workers in Trinidad, and encouraged the rise of a labour movement. Conditions on the islands worsened in the 1930s with the onset of the Great Depression, with an outbreak of labour riots occurring in 1937 which resulted in several deaths. The labour movement aimed to unite the urban working class and agricultural labour class; the key figures being Arthur Cipriani, who led the Trinidad Labour Party (TLP), Tubal Uriah "Buzz" Butler of the British Empire Citizens' and Workers' Home Rule Party, and Adrian Cola Rienzi, who led the Trinidad Citizens League (TCL), Oilfields Workers' Trade Union, and All Trinidad Sugar Estates and Factory Workers Union. As the movement developed calls for greater autonomy from British colonial rule became widespread; this effort was severely undermined by the British Home Office and by the British-educated Trinidadian elite, many of whom were descended from the plantocracy class.

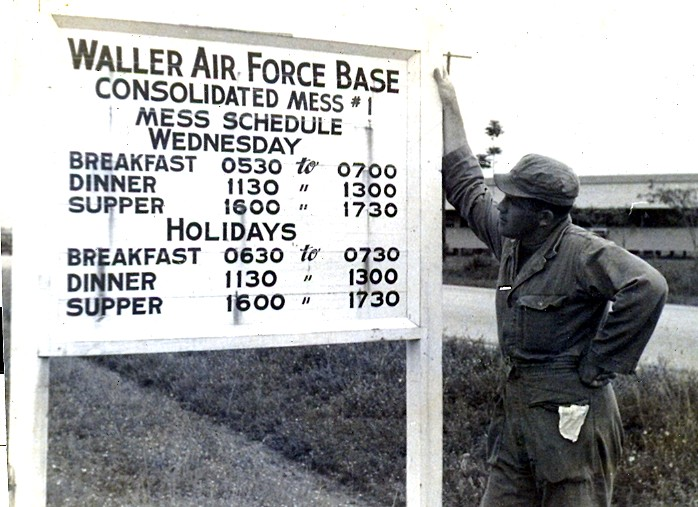
A soldier at Waller Air Force Base, leased by Britain to America in the 1940s

Petroleum had been discovered in 1857, but became economically significant only in the 1930s and afterwards as a result of the collapse of sugarcane and cocoa, and increasing industrialisation. By the 1950s petroleum had become a staple in Trinidad's export market, and was responsible for a growing middle class among all sections of the Trinidad population. The collapse of Trinidad's major agricultural commodities, followed by the Depression, and the rise of the oil economy, led to major changes in the country's social structure.

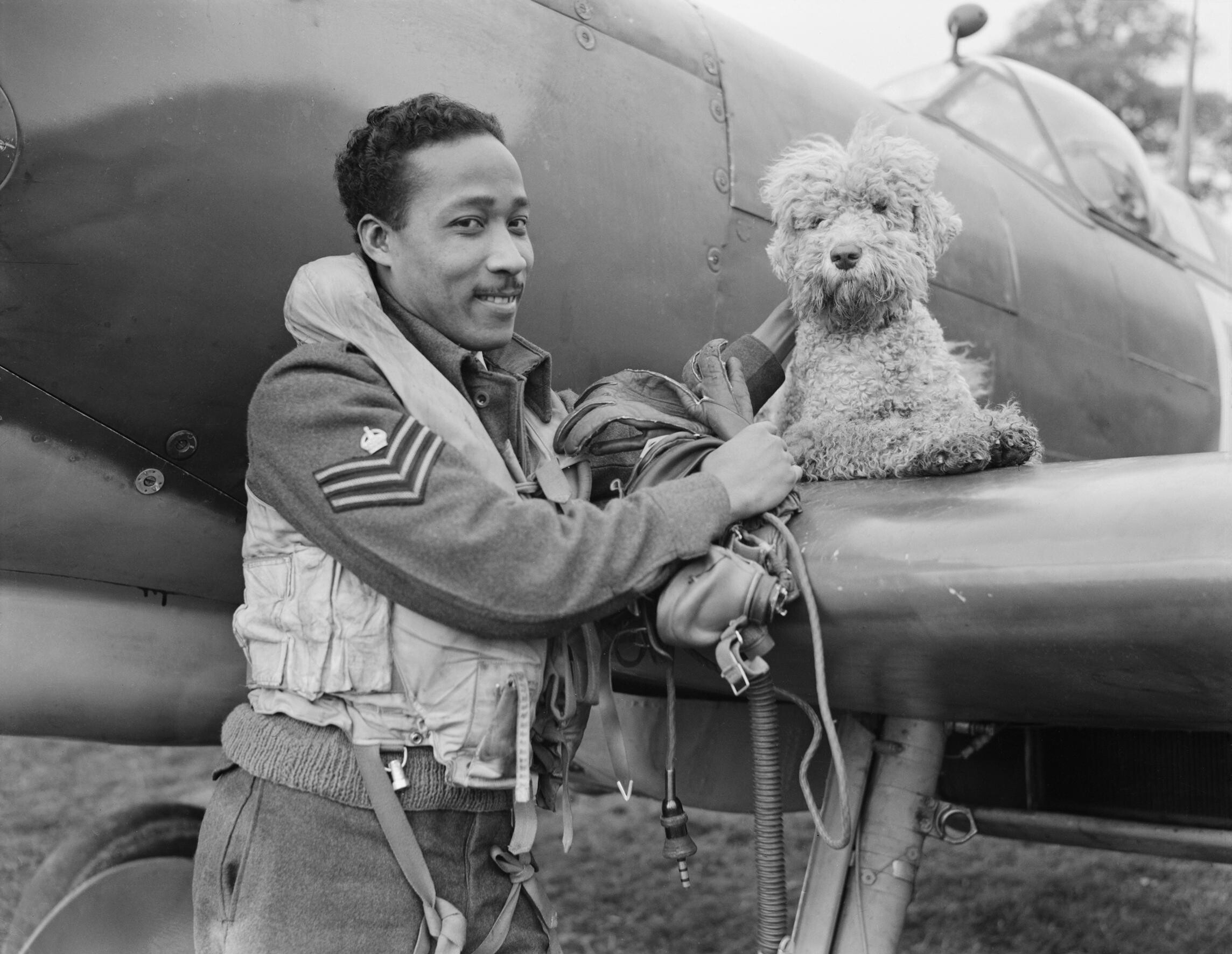
Flight Sergeant James Hyde, a Trinidadian fighter pilot serving with No 132 Squadron, Royal Air Force, c. 1944

The presence of American military bases in Chaguaramas and Cumuto in Trinidad during World War II had a profound effect on society. The Americans vastly improved the infrastructure on Trinidad and provided many locals with well-paying jobs. The Americans left in 1961.

In the post-war period the British began a process of decolonisation across the British Empire. In 1945 universal suffrage was introduced to Trinidad and Tobago. Political parties emerged on the island, however these were largely divided along racial lines: Afro–Trinidadians and Tobagonians primarily supported the People's National Movement (PNM), formed in 1956 by Eric Williams, with Indo-Trinidadians and Tobagonians mostly supporting the People's Democratic Party (PDP), formed in 1953 by Bhadase Sagan Maraj, which later merged into the Democratic Labour Party (DLP) in 1957. Britain's Caribbean colonies formed the West Indies Federation in 1958 as a vehicle for independence, however the Federation dissolved after Jamaica withdrew following a membership referendum in 1961. The government of Trinidad and Tobago subsequently chose to seek independence from the United Kingdom on its own.

=== Contemporary era ===
Leaders at Independence

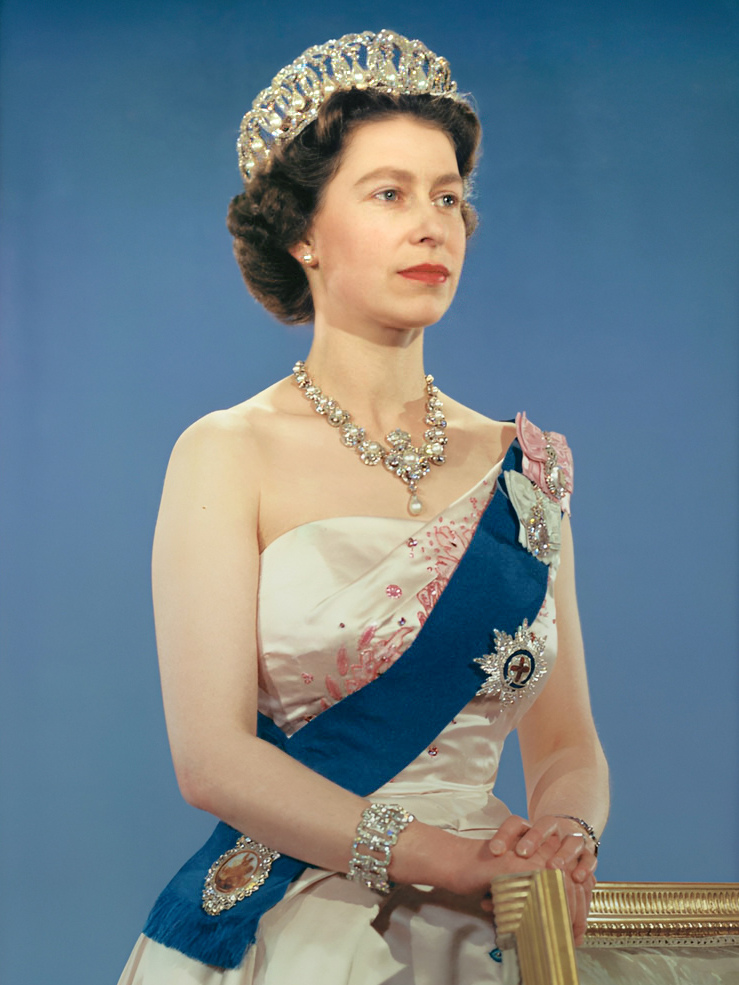
Elizabeth II
Monarch

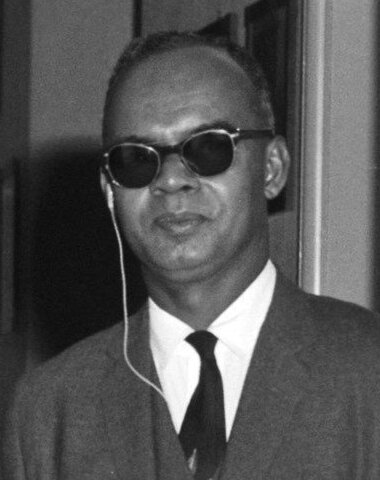
Eric Williams
Prime Minister

Trinidad and Tobago gained its independence from the United Kingdom on 31 August 1962. However, Elizabeth II remained head of state, represented locally by Governor-General Solomon Hochoy, until the passage of the 1976 Republican Constitution.

Eric Williams of the People's National Movement became the first prime minister, serving in that capacity uninterrupted until 1981. The dominant figure in the opposition in the early independence years was Opposition leader Rudranath Capildeo of the Democratic Labour Party. The first speaker of the House of Representatives was Clytus Arnold Thomasos and the first president of the Senate was J. Hamilton Maurice. The 1960s saw the rise of a Black Power movement, inspired in part by the civil rights movement in the United States. Protests and strikes became common, with events coming to head in April 1970 when police shot dead a protester named Basil Davis. Fearing a breakdown of law and order, Prime Minister Williams declared a state of emergency and ordered that many of the Black Power leaders be arrested. Some army leaders who were sympathetic to the Black Power movement, notably Raffique Shah and Rex Lassalle, attempted to mutiny; however, this was quashed by the Trinidad and Tobago Coast Guard. Williams and the PNM retained power, largely due to divisions in the opposition.

Amidst the backdrop of the rising Black Power movement in 1960s Trinidad and Tobago, and following protests, strikes, and a mutiny attempt in April 1970, a more radical opposition emerged in the form of the National Union of Freedom Fighters (NUFF). Dissatisfied with the perceived slow progress of change, and inspired by guerrilla warfare tactics, NUFF members launched attacks on banks, police stations, and other infrastructure, aiming to ignite a full-scale revolution against Prime Minister Eric Williams' government. However, the group faced increasing pressure from police and security forces, leading to the deaths of many members and the eventual suppression of the insurgency by 1974.

In 1963 Tobago was struck by Hurricane Flora, which killed 30 people and resulted in enormous destruction across the island. Partly as a result of this, tourism came to replace agriculture as the island's primary source of income in the subsequent decades. On 1 May 1968, Trinidad and Tobago joined the Caribbean Free Trade Association (CARIFTA), which provided a continued economic, rather than political, linkage between the former British West Indies English-speaking countries after the West Indies Federation failed. On 1 August 1973, the country became a founding member state of CARIFTA's successor, the Caribbean Community (CARICOM), which is a political and economic union between several Caribbean countries and territories.

Between 1972 and 1983, the country profited greatly from the rising price of oil and the discovery of vast new oil deposits in its territorial waters, resulting in an economic boom that substantially increased living standards. In 1976 the country became a republic within the Commonwealth, though it retained the Judicial Committee of the Privy Council as its final appellate court. The position of governor-general was replaced with that of President; Ellis Clarke was the first to hold this largely ceremonial role. Tobago was granted limited self-rule with the creation of the Tobago House of Assembly in 1980.

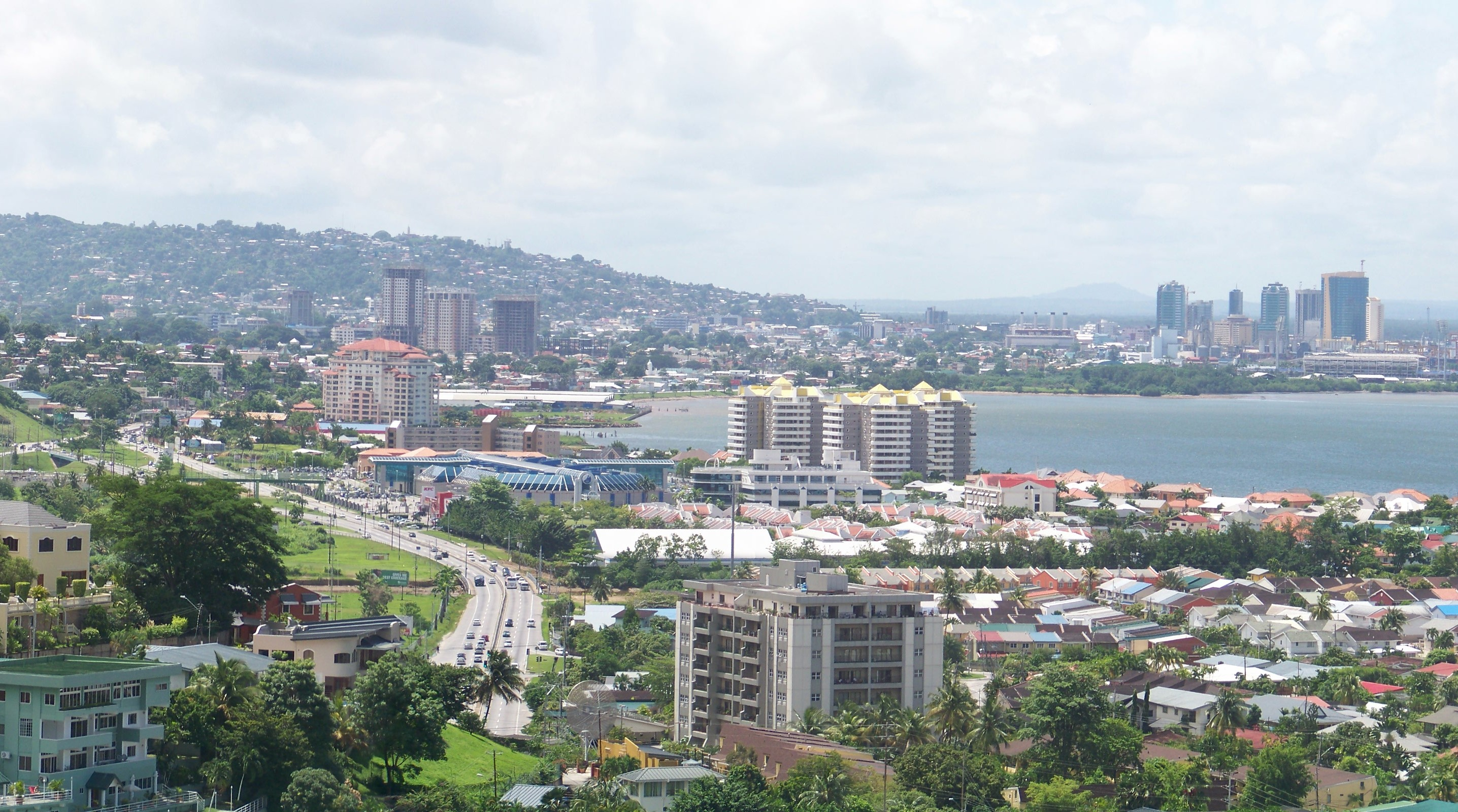
Port of Spain, the capital, in 2008

Williams died in 1981, being replaced by George Chambers who led the country until 1986. By this time a fall in the price of oil had resulted in a recession, causing rising inflation and unemployment. The main opposition parties united under the banner of National Alliance for Reconstruction (NAR) and won the 1986 Trinidad and Tobago general election, with NAR leader A. N. R. Robinson becoming the new prime minister. Robinson was unable to hold together the fragile NAR coalition, and his economic reforms, such as the implementation of an International Monetary Fund Structural Adjustment Program and devaluation of currency led to social unrest. In 1990, 114 members of the Jamaat al Muslimeen, led by Yasin Abu Bakr (formerly known as Lennox Phillip) stormed the Red House (the seat of Parliament), and Trinidad and Tobago Television, the only television station in the country at the time, holding Robinson and country's government hostage for six days before surrendering. The coup leaders were promised amnesty, but upon their surrender they were arrested, ultimately being released after protracted legal wrangling.

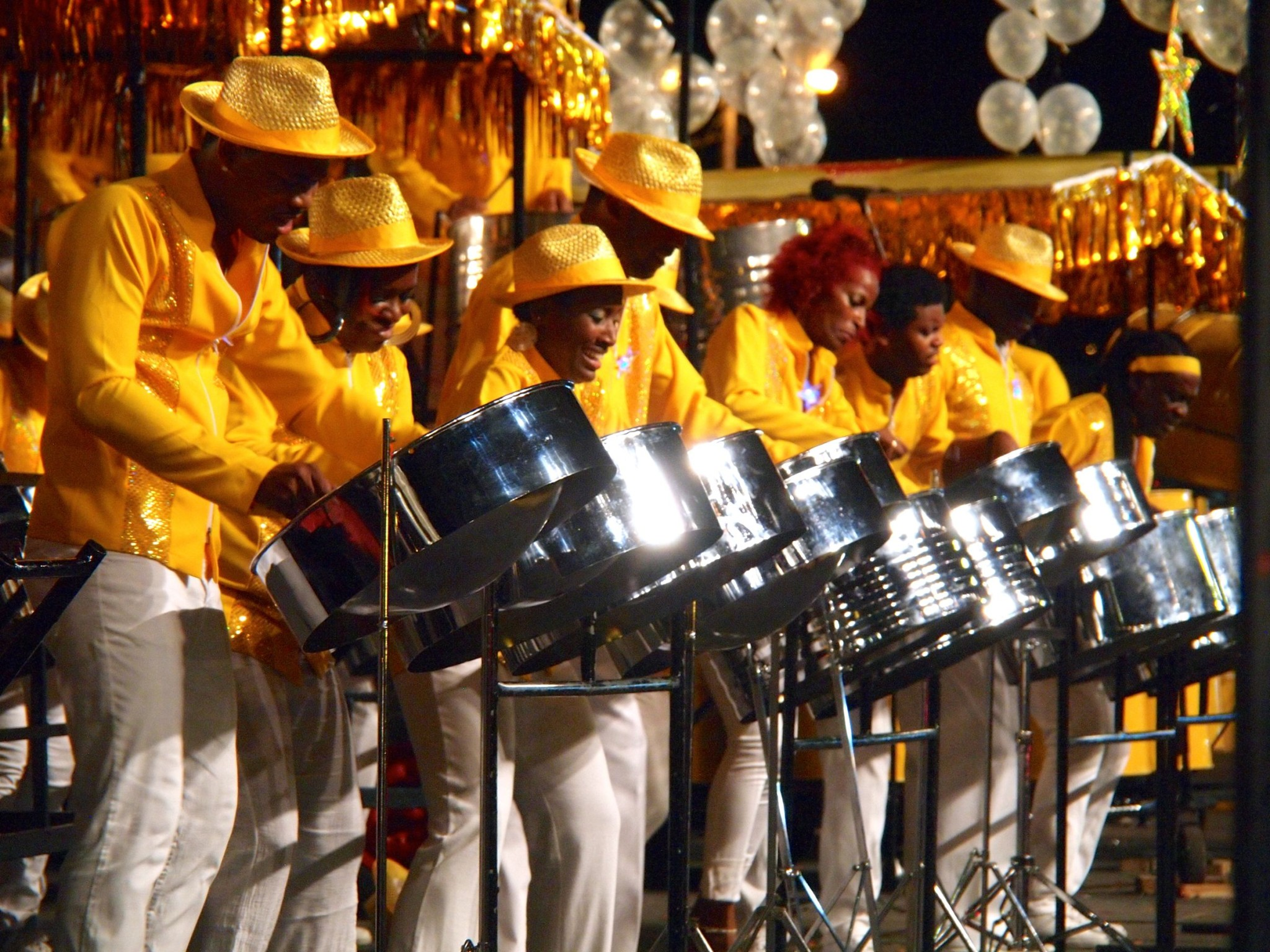
Steelpan band at Carnival

The PNM under Patrick Manning returned to power following the 1991 Trinidad and Tobago general election. Hoping to capitalise on an improvement in the economy, Manning called an early election in 1995, however, this resulted in a hung parliament. Two NAR representatives backed the opposition United National Congress (UNC), which had split off from the NAR in 1989, and they thus took power under Basdeo Panday, who became the country's first Indo-Trinidadian Prime Minister. After a period of political confusion caused by a series of inconclusive election results, Patrick Manning returned to power in 2001, retaining that position until 2010.

In 2003 the country entered a second oil boom, and petroleum, petrochemicals and natural gas continue to be the backbone of the economy. Tourism and the public service are the mainstay of the economy of Tobago, though authorities have attempted to diversify the island's economy. A partnership resulted in Manning's defeat by the newly formed People's Partnership (PP) coalition in 2010, with Kamla Persad-Bissessar becoming the country's first female prime minister. Under the PP, a state of emergency (SOE) was declared because of a spike in killings, and curfews were declared in so called "hotspots" around the country. The SOE lasted from 21 August 2011 to 5 December 2011. However, the PP were defeated in 2015 by the PNM under Keith Rowley. In August 2020, the governing People's National Movement won general election, earning the incumbent prime minister Keith Rowley a second term in office. During the second term of Dr. Keith Rowley there were two declarations of states of emergency (SOE). The first, which came into effect on 15 May 2021, was to deal with the COVID-19 pandemic. It involved curfews and restrictions on activities and public events. The second SOE came into effect on 30 December, 2024. The PM announced that it was to "address individuals who pose a threat to public safety, particularly those involved in criminal activities and the illegal use of firearms". No curfews or restrictions on public events was announced. The SOE was expected to end in mid April 2025. A curfew imposed on 18 July 2025 remains in effect as of November 2025.

During the same period, Trinidad and Tobago hosted the seventh Commonwealth Youth Games. It was originally scheduled for 2021 but was delayed due to the COVID pandemic. The games were successfully heldt 4–11 August 2023, in Trinidad and Tobago. It is first time a Caribbean country hosted the games. On 3 January 2024, Prime Minister Keith Rowley announced his intention to leave office as Prime Minister before the 2025 Trinidad and Tobago general election. On 26 February 2025 Prime Minister Keith Rowley announced he will officially resign from office on 16 March. On 6 January 2025, Prime Minister Keith Rowley made the announcement that Minister Stuart Young was elected by the Parliamentary Caucus of the People's National Movement as Prime Minister, succeeding Rowley. In April 2025, the opposition, centrist United National Congress (UNC), won the election, meaning Kamla Persad-Bissessar became the next prime minister.

== Geography ==
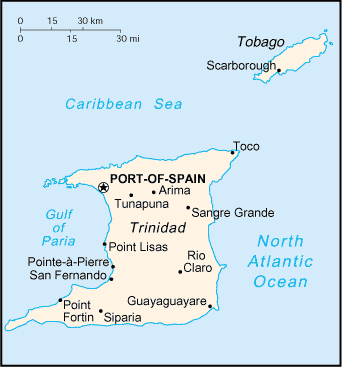
A map of Trinidad and Tobago

Trinidad and Tobago is situated between 10° 2' and 11° 12' N latitude and 60° 30' and 61° 56' W longitude, with the Caribbean Sea to the north, the Atlantic Ocean to the east and south, and the Gulf of Paria to the west. It is located in the far south-east of the Caribbean region, with the island of Trinidad being just 6 nautical miles (11 km; 6.9 mi) off the coast of Venezuela in mainland South America across the Columbus Channel. The islands are a physiographic extension of South America. Covering an area of 5,128 square kilometres (1,980 sq mi), the country consists of two main islands, Trinidad and Tobago, separated by a twenty-nautical-mile (37 km; 23 mi) strait, plus a number of much smaller islands, including Chacachacare, Monos, Huevos, Gaspar Grande (or Gasparee), Little Tobago, and Saint Giles Island.

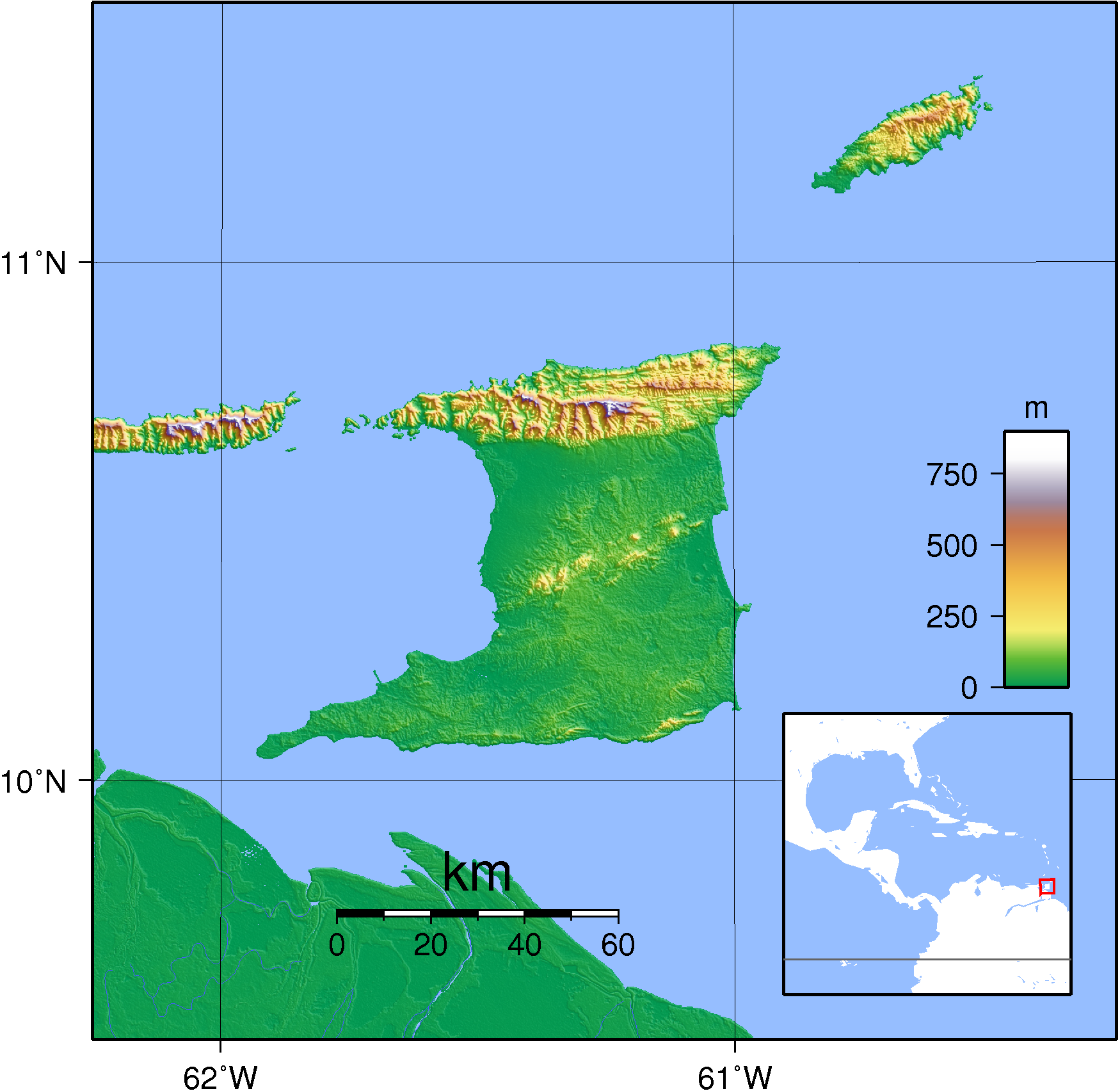
Trinidad and Tobago's topography

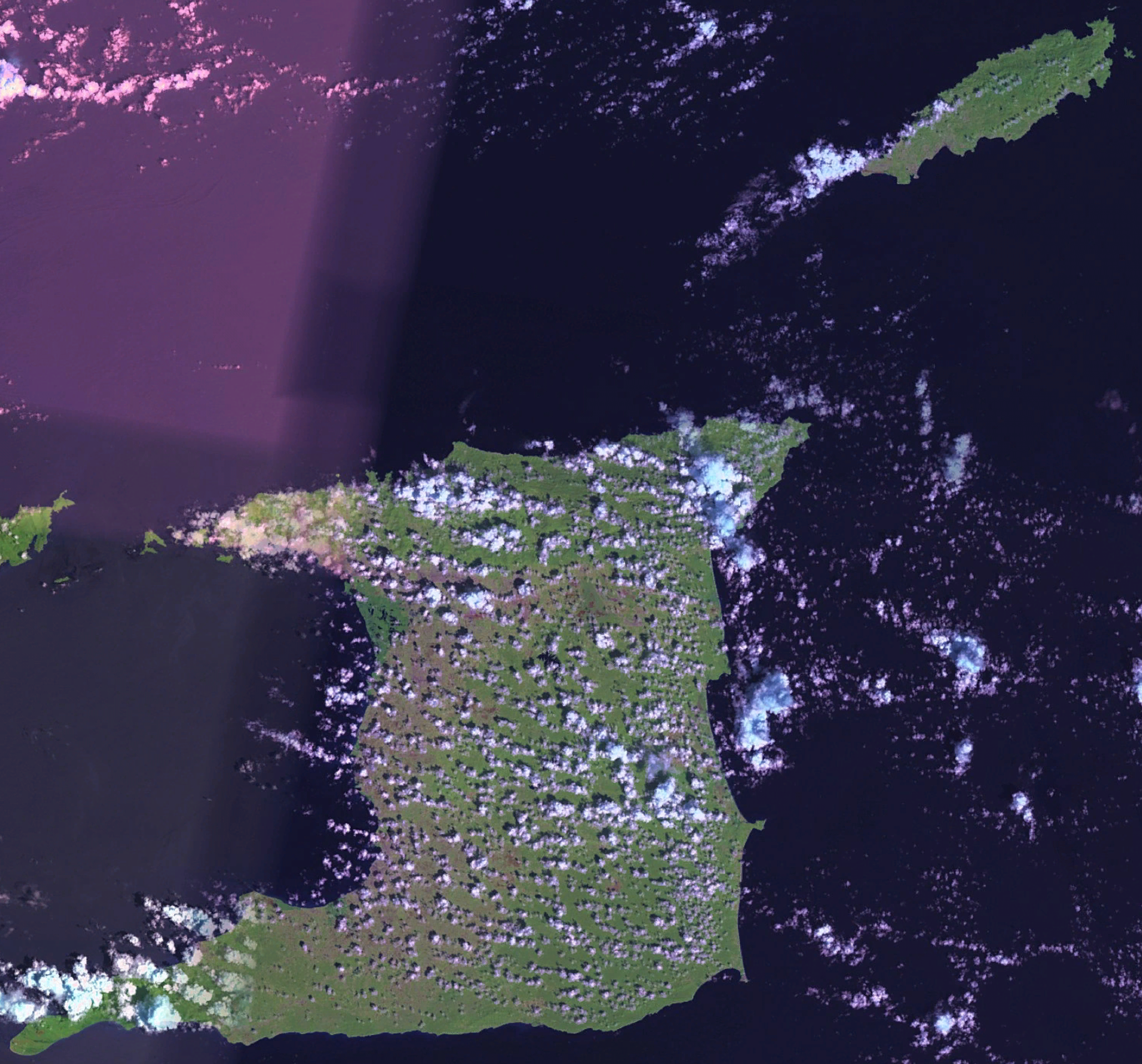
Trinidad and Tobago from space

Trinidad is 4,768 square kilometres (1,841 sq mi) in area (comprising 93.0% of the country's total area) with an average length of 80 kilometres (50 mi) and an average width of 59 kilometres (37 mi). Tobago has an area of about 300 square kilometres (120 sq mi), or 5.8% of the country's area, is 41 kilometres (25 1/2 mi) long and 12 kilometres (7 1/2 mi) at its greatest width. Trinidad lies on the continental shelf of South America, and is thus geologically considered to lie entirely in South America.

The terrain of the islands is a mixture of mountains and plains. On Trinidad the Northern Range runs parallel with the north coast, and contains the country's highest peak (El Cerro del Aripo), which is 940 metres (3,080 ft) above sea level, and second highest (El Tucuche, 936 metres (3,071 ft)). The rest of the island is generally flatter, excluding the Central Range and Montserrat Hills in the centre of the island and the Southern Range and Trinity Hills in the south. The three mountain ranges determine the drainage pattern of Trinidad. The east coast is noted for its beaches, most notably Manzanilla Beach. The island contains several large swamp areas, such as the Caroni Swamp and the Nariva Swamp. Major bodies of water on Trinidad include the Hollis Reservoir, Navet Reservoir, Caroni Reservoir. Trinidad is made up of a variety of soil types, the majority being fine sands and heavy clays. The alluvial valleys of the Northern Range and the soils of the East–West Corridor are the most fertile. Trinidad is also notable for containing Pitch Lake, the largest natural reservoir of asphalt in the world. Tobago contains a flat plain in its south-west, with the eastern half of the island being more mountainous, culminating in Pigeon Peak, the island's highest point at 550 metres (1,800 ft). Tobago also contains several coral reefs off its coast.

The majority of the population reside on the island of Trinidad, and this is thus the location of largest towns and cities. There are four major municipalities in Trinidad: the capital city, Port of Spain, as well as San Fernando, Arima and Chaguanas. The main town on Tobago is Scarborough.

=== Geology ===
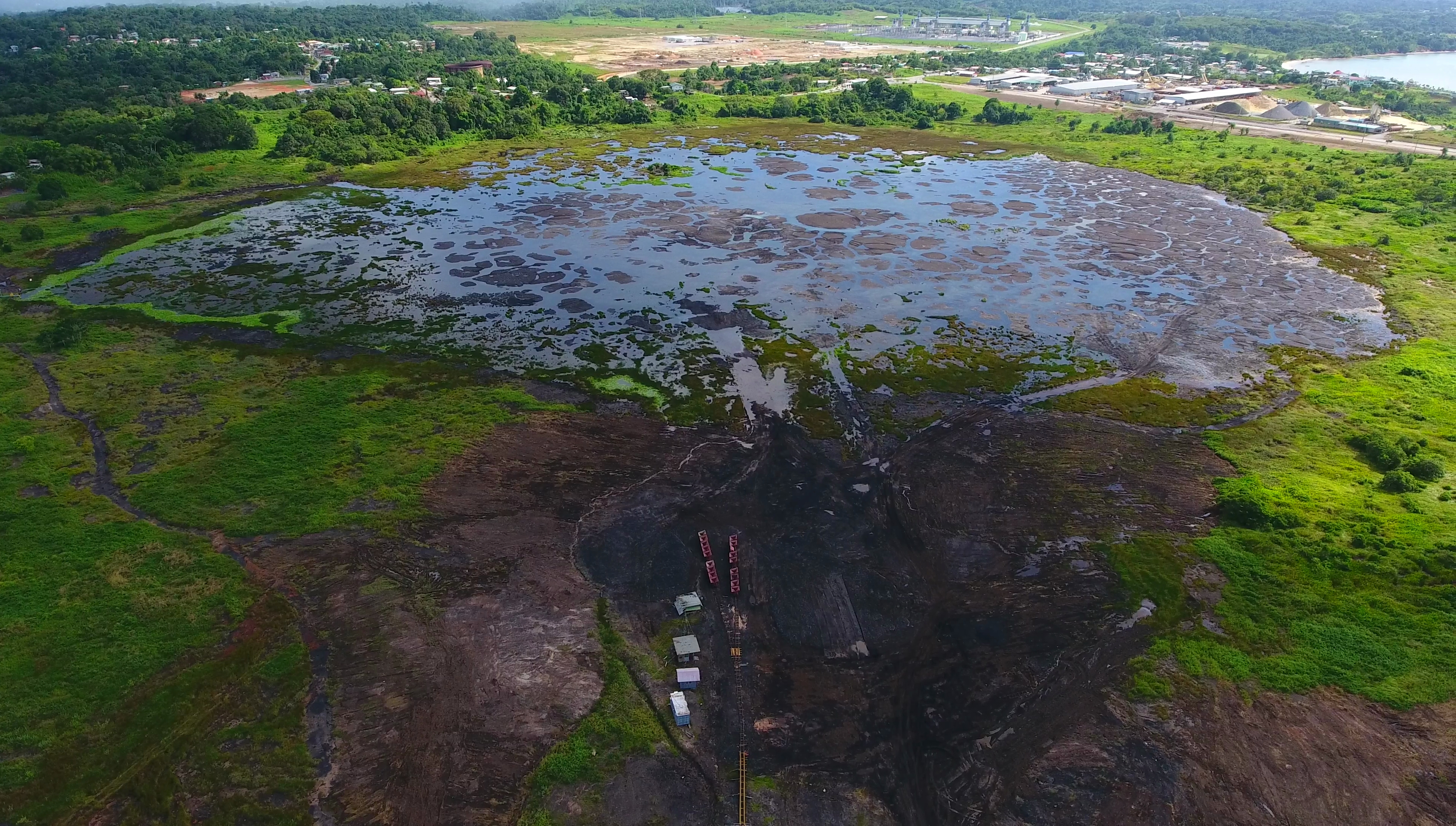
Pitch Lake, in south-west Trinidad

The Northern Range consists mainly of Upper Jurassic and Cretaceous metamorphic rocks. The Northern Lowlands (the East–West Corridor and Caroni Plain) consist of younger shallow marine clastic sediments. South of this, the Central Range fold and thrust belt consists of Cretaceous and Eocene sedimentary rocks, with Miocene formations along the southern and eastern flanks. The Naparima Plain and the Nariva Swamp form the southern shoulder of this uplift.

The Southern Lowlands consist of Miocene and Pliocene sands, clays, and gravels. These overlie oil and natural gas deposits, especially north of the Los Bajos Fault. The Southern Range forms the third anticlinal uplift. The rocks consist of sandstones, shales, siltstones and clays formed in the Miocene and uplifted in the Pleistocene. Oil sands and mud volcanoes are especially common in this area.

One of the natural wonders of the island is Pitch Lake, a natural pitch lake on the island of Trinidad which is the largest naturally occurring deposit of asphalt on Earth.

=== Climate ===
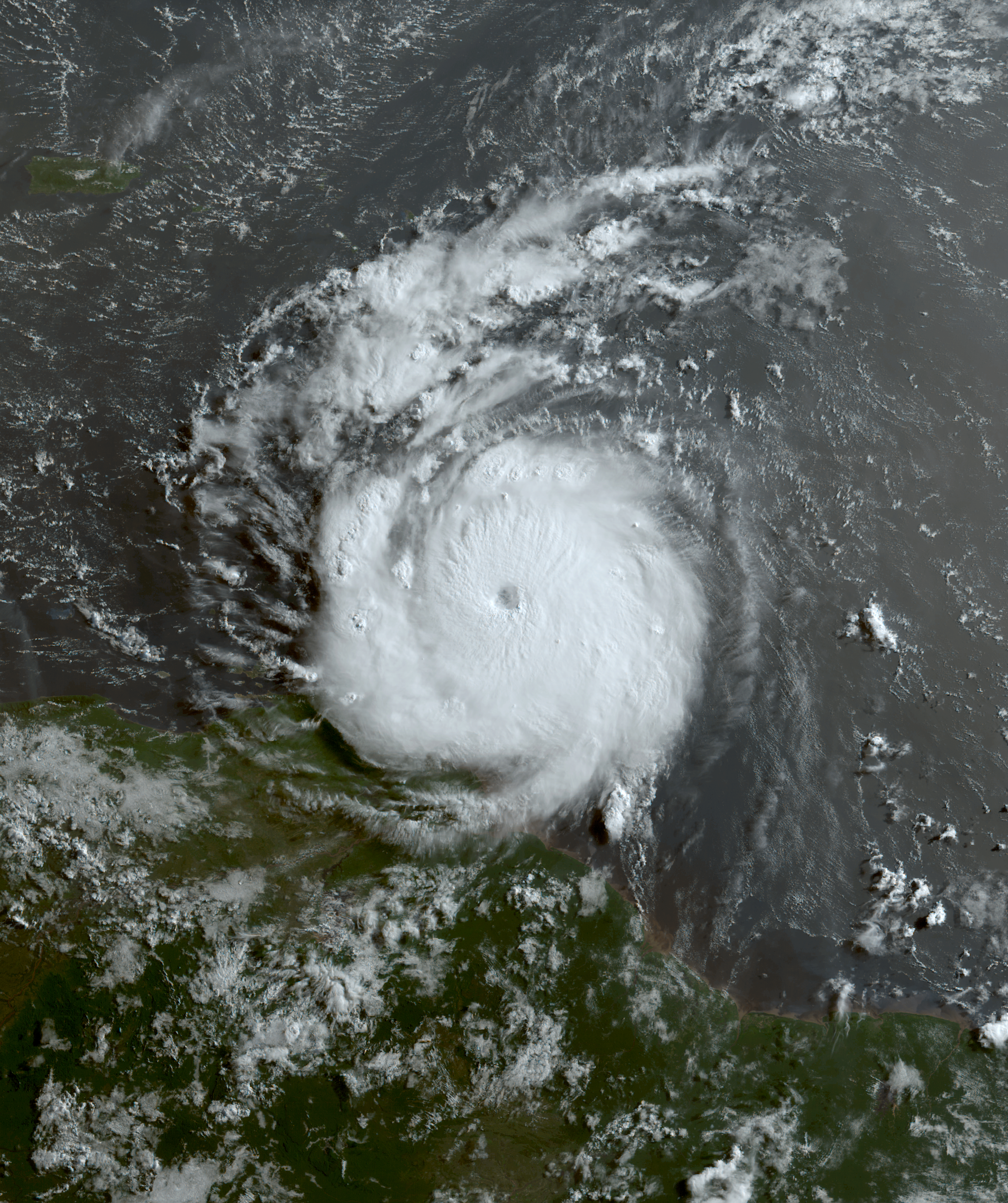
Hurricane Beryl passes over Trinidad and Tobago in July 2024.

Trinidad and Tobago has a maritime tropical climate. There are two seasons annually: the dry season for the first five month of the years, and the rainy season in the remaining seven months of the year. Winds are predominantly from the northeast and are dominated by the northeast trade winds. Unlike many Caribbean islands Trinidad and Tobago lies outside the main hurricane alleys; nevertheless, the island of Tobago was struck by Hurricane Flora on 30 September 1963. In the Northern Range of Trinidad, the climate is often cooler than that of the plains below, due to constant cloud and mist cover, and heavy rains in the mountains.

Record temperatures for Trinidad and Tobago are 39 °C (102 °F) for the high in Port of Spain, and a low of 12 °C (54 °F).

=== Biodiversity ===
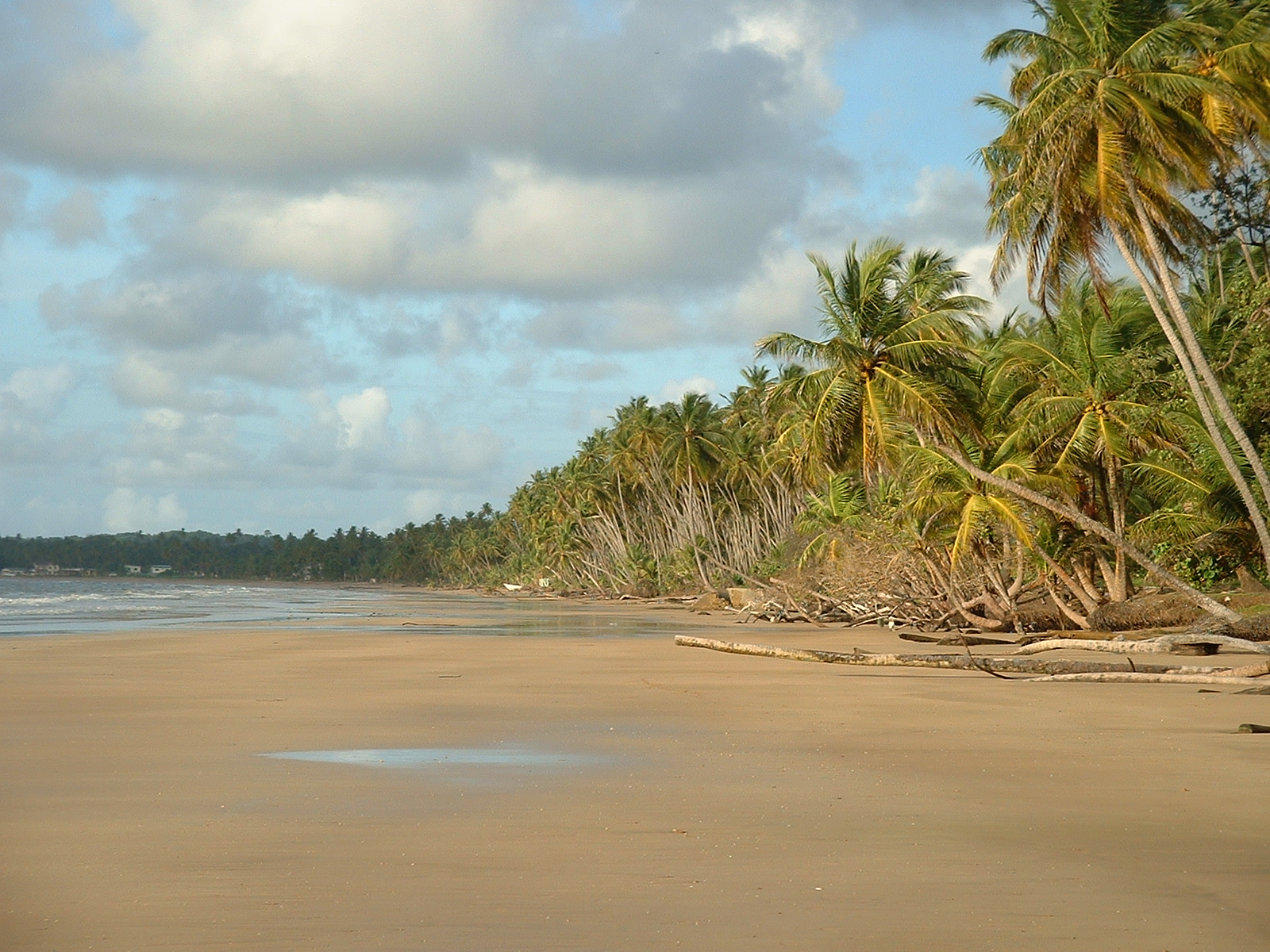
Mayaro Beach, in the southeastern area of Trinidad

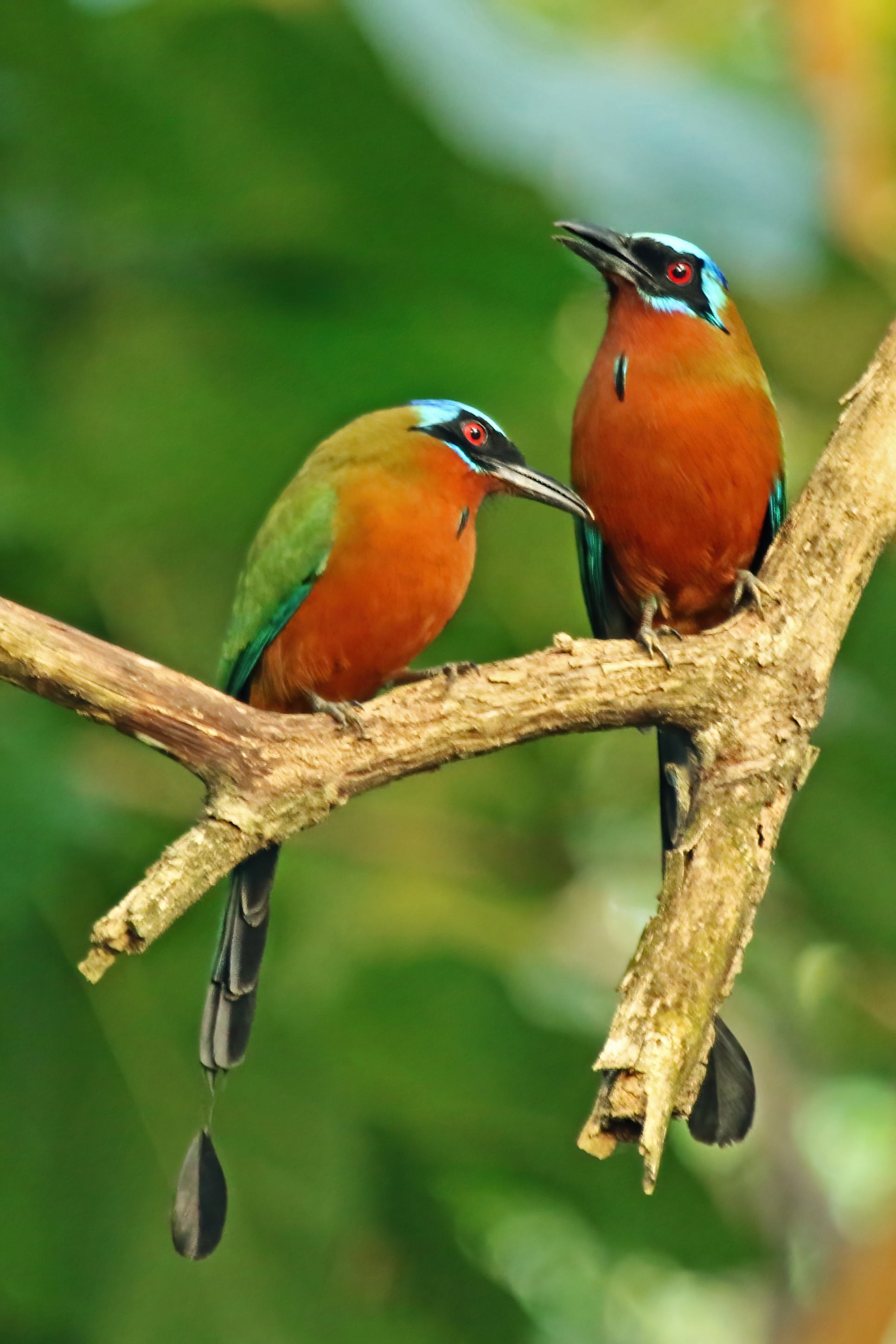
Trinidad Motmots

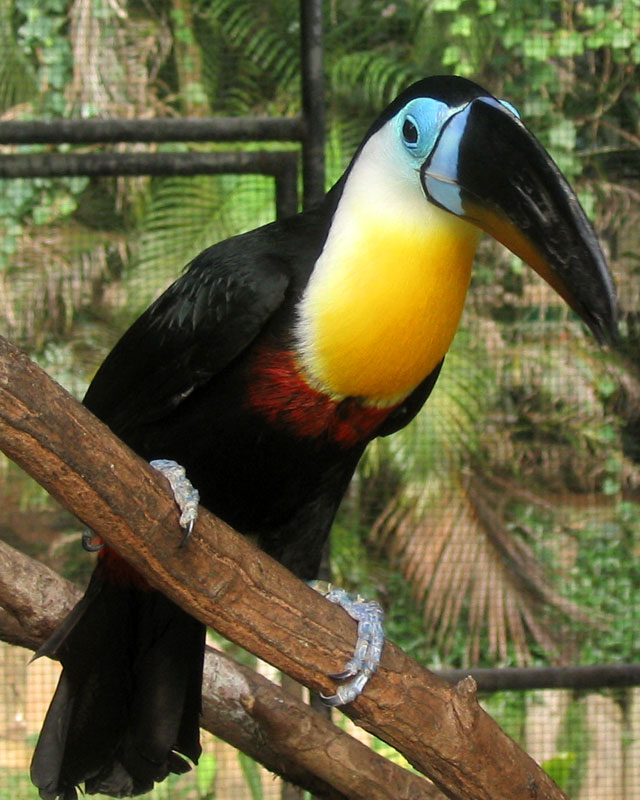
Channel-billed toucan, Trinidad

Because the island of Trinidad and Tobago lies on the continental shelf of South America, and in ancient times was physically connected to the South American mainland, its biological diversity is unlike that of most other Caribbean islands, and has much more in common with that of Venezuela. The main ecosystems are: coastal and marine (coral reefs, mangrove swamps, open ocean and seagrass beds); forest; freshwater (rivers and streams); karst; man-made ecosystems (agricultural land, freshwater dams, secondary forest); and savanna. On 1 August 1996, Trinidad and Tobago ratified the 1992 Rio Convention on Biological Diversity, and it has produced a biodiversity action plan and four reports describing the country's contribution to biodiversity conservation. These reports formally acknowledged the importance of biodiversity to the well-being of the country's people through provision of ecosystem services.

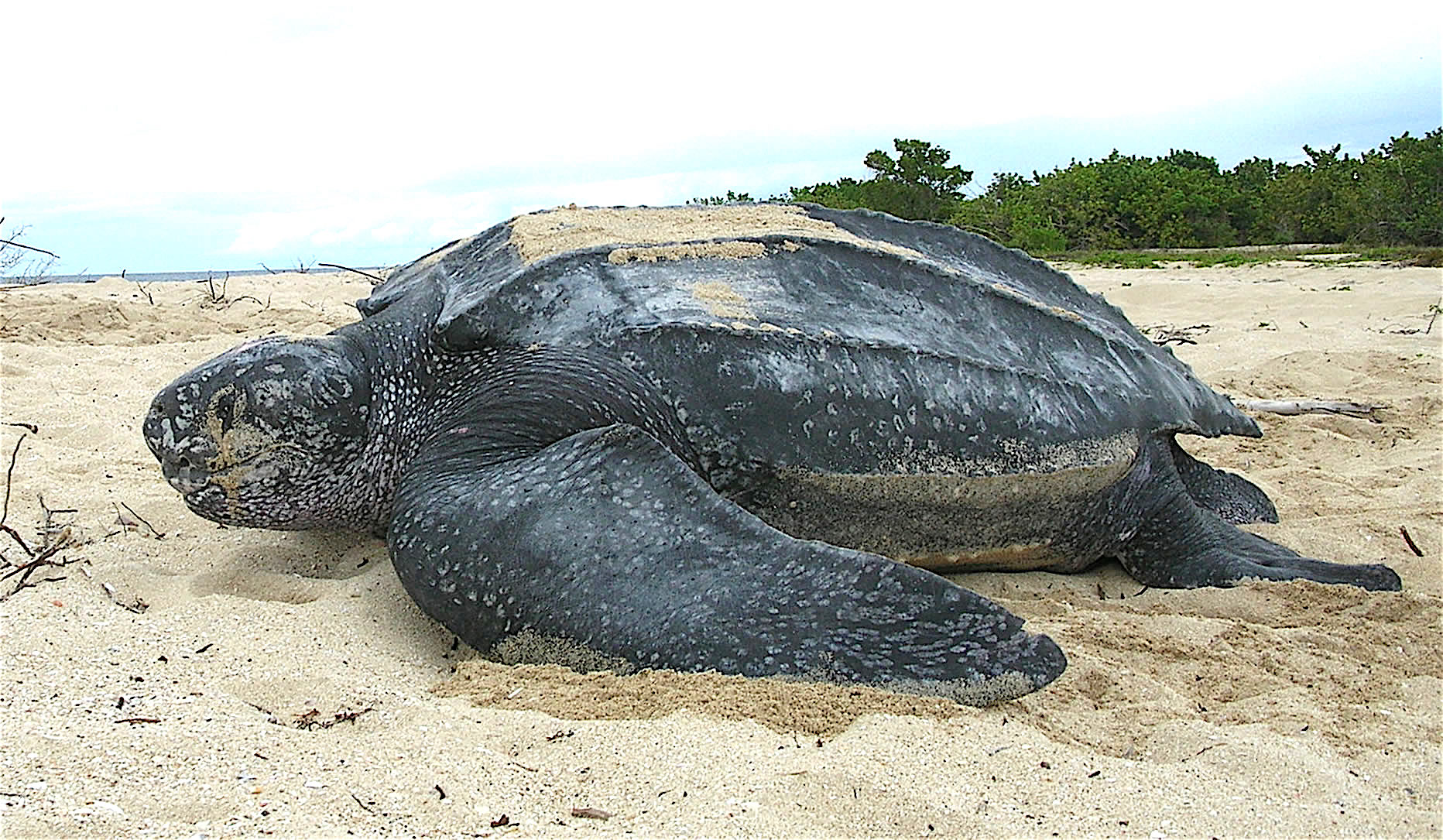
Trinidad and Tobago is a major nesting site for Leatherback Turtles.

Information about vertebrates is rather comprehensive, with 472 bird species (2 endemics), about 100 mammals, about 90 reptiles (a few endemics), about 30 amphibians (including several endemics), 50 freshwater fish and at least 950 marine fish. Notable mammal species include the ocelot, West Indian manatee, collared peccary (known as the quenk locally), red-rumped agouti, lappe, red brocket deer, Neotropical otter, weeper capuchin and red howler monkey; there are also some 70 species of bat, including the vampire bat and fringe-lipped bat. The larger reptiles present include 5 species of marine turtles known to nest on the islands' beaches, the green anaconda, the Boa constrictor and the spectacled caiman. There are at least 47 species of snakes, including only four dangerous venomous species (only in Trinidad and not in Tobago), lizards such as the green iguana, the Tupinambis cryptus and a few species of fresh water turtles and land tortoises. are present. Of the amphibians, the golden tree frog and Trinidad poison frog are found in the highest peaks of Trinidad's Northern Range and nearby on Venezuela's Paria Peninsula. Marine life is abundant, with several species of sea urchin, coral, lobster, sea anemone, starfish, manta ray, dolphin, porpoise and whale shark present in the islands' waters. The introduced Pterois is viewed as a pest, as it eats many native species of fish and has no natural predators; efforts are currently underway to cull the numbers of this species. The country contains five terrestrial ecoregions: Trinidad and Tobago moist forests, Lesser Antillean dry forests, Trinidad and Tobago dry forests, Windward Islands xeric scrub, and Trinidad mangroves.

Trinidad and Tobago is noted particularly for its large number of bird species, and is a popular destination for bird watchers. Notable species include the scarlet ibis, cocrico, egret, shiny cowbird, bananaquit, oilbird and various species of honeycreeper, trogon, toucan, parrot, tanager, woodpecker, antbird, kites, hawks, boobies, pelicans and vultures; there are also 17 species of hummingbird, including the tufted coquette which is the world's third smallest.

Information about invertebrates is dispersed and very incomplete. About 650 butterflies, at least 672 beetles (from Tobago alone) and 40 corals have been recorded. Other notable invertebrates include the cockroach, leaf-cutter ant and numerous species of mosquitoes, termites, spiders and tarantulas.

Although the list is far from complete, 1,647 species of fungi, including lichens, have been recorded. The true total number of fungi is likely to be far higher, given the generally accepted estimate that only about 7% of all fungi worldwide have so far been discovered. A first effort to estimate the number of endemic fungi tentatively listed 407 species.

Information about micro-organisms is dispersed and very incomplete. Nearly 200 species of marine algae have been recorded. The true total number of micro-organism species must be much higher.

Thanks to a recently published checklist, plant diversity in Trinidad and Tobago is well documented with about 3,300 species (59 endemic) recorded. Despite significant felling, forests still cover about 40% of the country, and there are about 350 different species of tree. A notable tree is the manchineel which is extremely poisonous to humans, and even just touching its sap can cause severe blistering of the skin; the tree is often covered with warning signs. The country had a 2019 Forest Landscape Integrity Index mean score of 6.62/10, ranking it 69th globally out of 172 countries.

Threats to the country's biodiversity include over-hunting and poaching (see Hunting#Trinidad and Tobago), habitat loss and fragmentation (particularly due to forest fires and land clearance for quarrying, agriculture, squatting, housing and industrial development and road construction), water pollution, and introduction of invasive species and pathogens.

== Government and politics ==
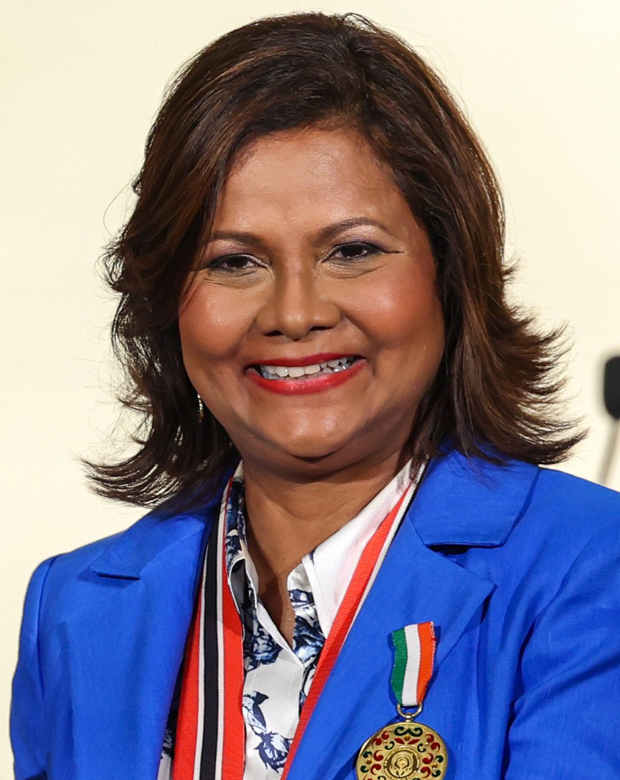
Christine Kangaloo
President
since 20 March 2023

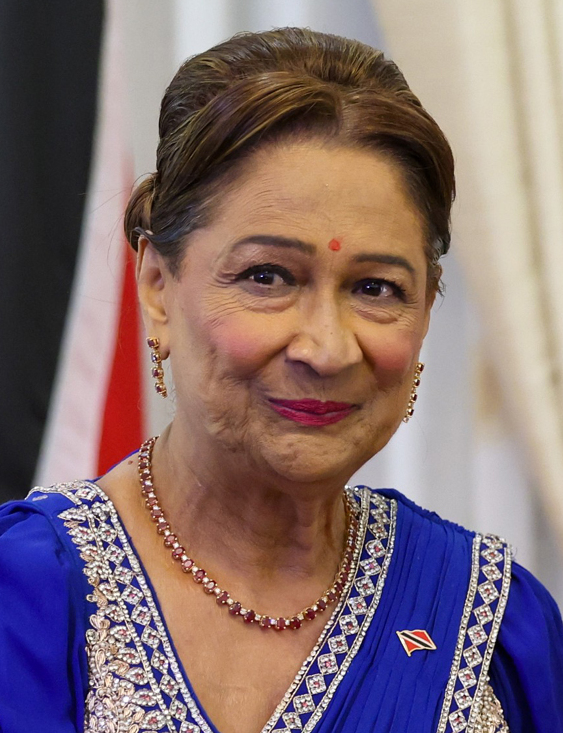
Kamla Persad-Bissessar
Prime Minister
since 1 May 2025

Trinidad and Tobago is a republic with a two-party system and a bicameral parliamentary system based on the Westminster System.

The head of state of Trinidad and Tobago is the president, a largely ceremonial role currently held by Christine Kangaloo. This position replaced that of the governor-general—who had represented the monarch of Trinidad and Tobago—when the country became a republic in 1976.

The head of government is the prime minister, currently Kamla Persad-Bissessar since May, 2025. On January 3, 2025, then-Prime Minister Keith Rowley announced his intention to demit office before the 2025 Trinidad and Tobago general election. He later confirmed on February 26 that he would officially resign on March 16. On January 6, 2025, Stuart Young was elected Prime Minister-designate by the Parliamentary Caucus of the People's National Movement to succeed Rowley. He officially assumed office on March 17, 2025. Young’s party, the People’s National Movement (PNM) subsequently lost elections with Young losing the prime ministership.

The president is elected by an electoral college composed of all members of both houses of the Parliament.

Following a general election, which takes place every five years, the president appoints as prime minister the person who has the support of a majority in the House of Representatives; this has generally been the leader of the party which won the most seats in the election (except in the case of the 2001 General Elections).

Since 1980 Tobago has also had its own elections, separate from the general elections. In these elections, members are elected and serve in the unicameral Tobago House of Assembly.

Parliament consists of the Senate (31 seats) and the House of Representatives (41 seats, plus the Speaker). The members of the Senate are appointed by the president; 16 government senators are appointed on the advice of the prime minister, six opposition senators are appointed on the advice of the leader of the opposition, currently Pennelope Beckles-Robinson, and nine independent senators are appointed by the president to represent other sectors of civil society. The 41 members of the House of Representatives are elected by the people for a maximum term of five years in a "first past the post" system.

=== Administrative divisions ===
Regional corporations and municipalities of Trinidad and Tobago

Trinidad is split into 14 regions and municipalities, consisting of nine regions and five municipalities, which have a limited level of autonomy. The various councils are made up of a mixture of elected and appointed members. Elections are held every three years. Tobago is administered by the Tobago House of Assembly. The country was formerly divided into counties. The various councils are made up of a mixture of directly elected councillors and aldermen chosen by party list. Elections are held every four years. Tobago is administered by the Tobago House of Assembly. The country was formerly divided into counties.

=== Political culture ===
The two main national parties are the People's National Movement (PNM) and the United National Congress (UNC). They both are left of centre parties and support for these parties appears to fall along ethnic lines rather than ideology, with the PNM consistently obtaining a majority of Afro-Trinidadian vote, and the UNC gaining a majority of Indo-Trinidadian support. Several smaller parties also exist. As of the August 2020 General Elections, there were 19 registered political parties. These include, the Progressive Empowerment Party, Trinidad Humanity Campaign, New National Vision, Movement for Social Justice, Congress of the People, Movement for National Development, Progressive Democratic Patriots, National Coalition for Transformation, Progressive Party, Independent Liberal Party, Democratic Party of Trinidad and Tobago, National Organisation of We the People, Unrepresented Peoples Party, Trinidad and Tobago Democratic Front, The National Party, One Tobago Voice, and Unity of the Peoples.

=== Military ===
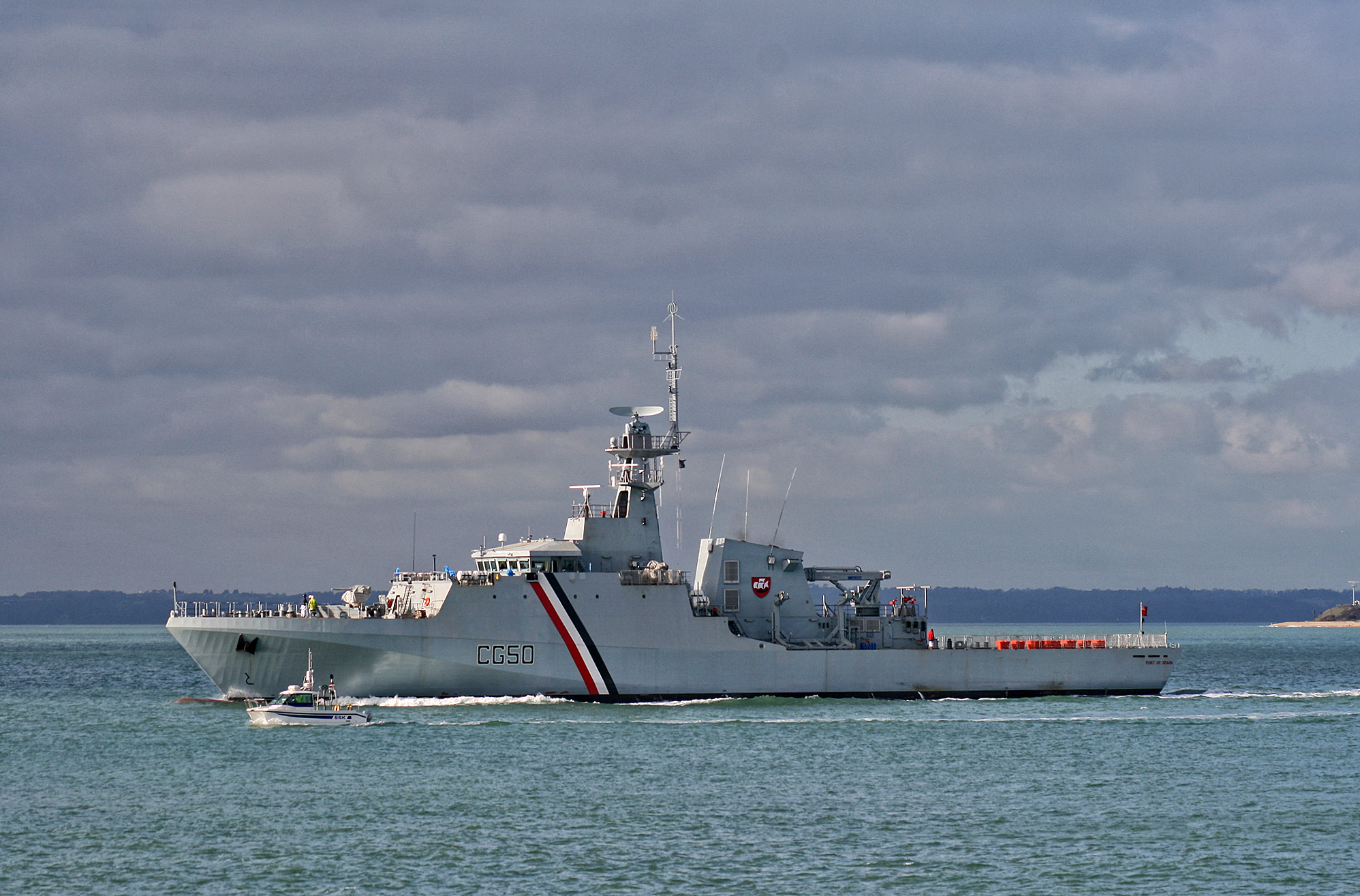
Coast Guard vessel in action

The Trinidad and Tobago Defence Force (TTDF) is the military organisation responsible for the defence of the twin island Republic of Trinidad and Tobago. It consists of the Regiment, the Coast Guard, the Air Guard and the Defence Force Reserves. Established in 1962 after Trinidad and Tobago's independence from the United Kingdom, the TTDF is one of the largest military forces in the Anglophone Caribbean.

Its mission statement is to "defend the sovereign good of The Republic of Trinidad and Tobago, contribute to the development of the national community and support the State in the fulfilment of its national and international objectives". The Defence Force has been engaged in domestic incidents, such as the Black Power Movement of 1970 and Jamaat al Muslimeen coup attempt, and international missions, such as the United Nations Mission in Haiti between 1993 and 1996.

In 2019, Trinidad and Tobago signed the UN treaty on the Prohibition of Nuclear Weapons.

Trinidad and Tobago is the 87th most peaceful country in the world, according to the 2024 Global Peace Index.

=== Foreign relations ===
Diplomatic missions of Trinidad and Tobago

Trinidad and Tobago maintains close relations with its Caribbean neighbours and major North American and European trading partners. As the most industrialised and second-largest country in the Anglophone Caribbean, Trinidad and Tobago has taken a leading role in the Caribbean Community (CARICOM), and strongly supports CARICOM economic integration efforts. It also is active in the Summit of the Americas process and supports the establishment of the Free Trade Area of the Americas, lobbying other nations for seating the Secretariat in Port of Spain.

As a member of CARICOM, Trinidad and Tobago strongly backed efforts by the United States to bring political stability to Haiti, contributing personnel to the Multinational Force in 1994. After its 1962 independence from the United Kingdom, Trinidad and Tobago joined the United Nations and Commonwealth of Nations. In 1967 it became the first Commonwealth country to join the Organization of American States (OAS). In 1995 Trinidad played host to the inaugural meeting of the Association of Caribbean States and has become the seat of this 35-member grouping, which seeks to further economic progress and integration among its states. In international forums, Trinidad and Tobago has defined itself as having an independent voting record, but often supports US and EU positions.

=== Law enforcement and crime ===
The primary law enforcement agency of Trinidad and Tobago is the Trinidad and Tobago Police Service under the Ministry of Homeland Security. The current minister is Roger Alexander. On June 13, 2025 the House of Representatives approved a government motion for Acting Senior Superintendent of Police Allister Guevarro to be Commissioner of Police (CoP). Another law enforcement agency is the Trinidad and Tobago Municipal Police Service (TTMPS) under the Ministry of Rural Development and Local Government. They work within the various city, borough, and regional corporations. The current minister is Khadijah Ameen with the current administrator of the TTMPS being Assistant Commissioner of Police (ACP) Wayne Mystar Some other law enforcement agencies include:

Ministry of Defence

- Trinidad and Tobago Coast Guard (TTCG): They are responsible for enforcing maritime law within the country's territorial waters.

Ministry of Justice

- The Trinidad and Tobago Forensic Science Centre began operations on December 1, 1983. They use forensic pathology and forensic science to collect, analyse and interpret all aspects of physical evidence submitted by police officers and other clients.

Ministry of Homeland Security

- The Immigration Division of Trinidad and Tobago: they are the principal government agency responsible for the administration and enforcement of immigration, passport and citizenship laws.
- The Strategic Services Agency (SSA): Their primary purpose is to gather and analyse intelligence related to serious crime, including drug trafficking, organised crime, and threats to national security.

Ministry of Finance

- Trinidad and Tobago Customs and Excise Division: They are responsible for enforcement of customs and excise laws.
- The Financial Intelligence Unit of Trinidad and Tobago (FIUTT) became operational in February 2010. Their responsibilities are to implement the anti-money laundering and anti-terrorism policies of the Financial Action Task Force (FATF).

Ministry of Agriculture, Land and Fisheries

- The Praedial Larceny Squad (PLS) was established in November 2013 with the responsibility to reduce incidences of praedial larceny in the country.

Ministry of Transport and Civil Aviation

- Traffic Warden Division was established in 2011. They assist the Police with the management, control and regulation of road traffic in Trinidad and Tobago.

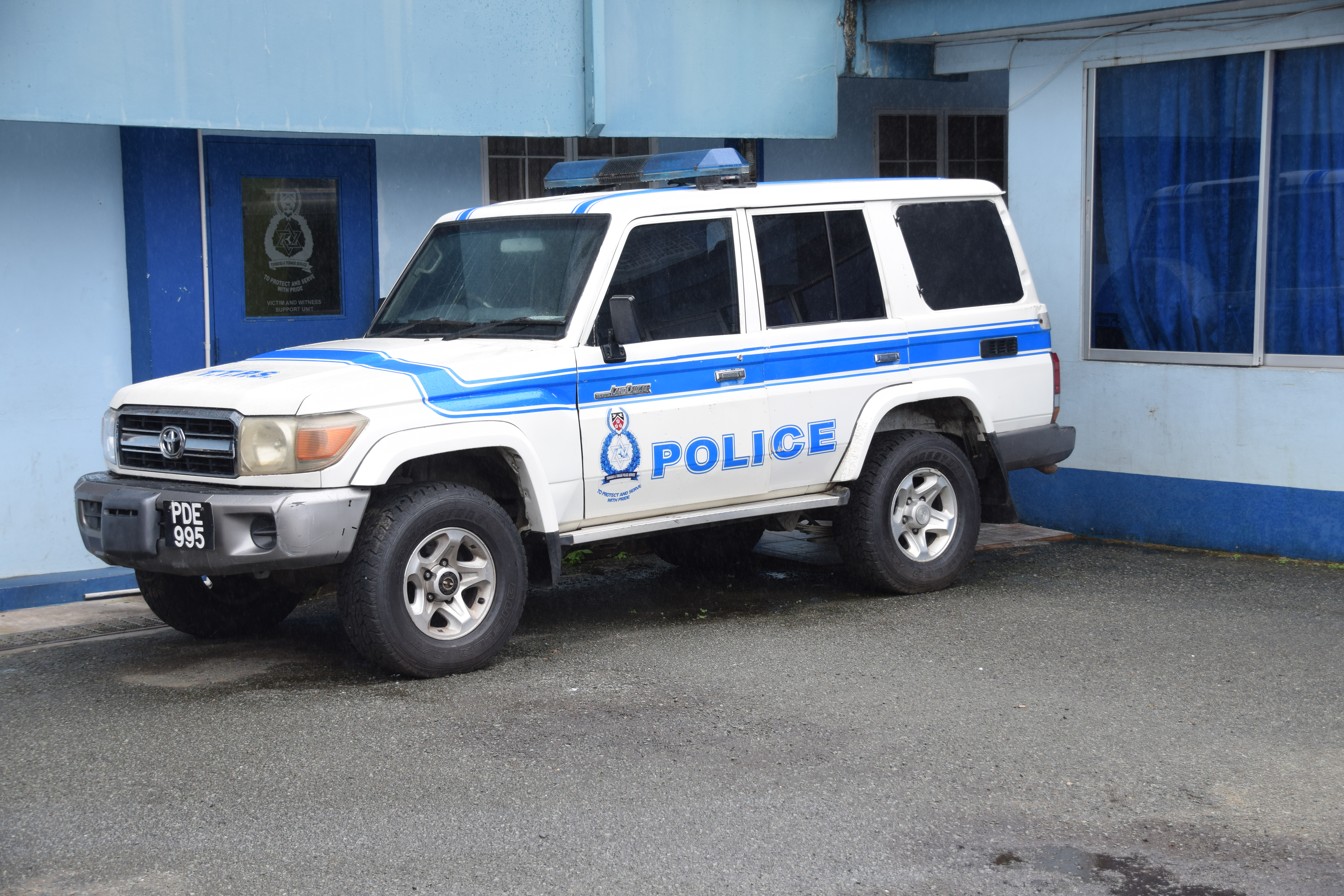
Trinidad Police vehicle on Tobago

==== Crime ====
Trinidad and Tobago has in recent decades suffered from a relatively high crime rate; there are roughly 500 murders per year. The country is a noted transshipment centre for the trafficking of illegal drugs from South America to the rest of the Caribbean and beyond to North America. Some estimates put the size of the "hidden economy" as high as 20–30% of measured GDP. On July 18, 2022 Prime Minister Dr Keith Rowley announced his government will look at the issue of violence and crime from a public health perspective. Also that a committee was formed with the task with defining the issue and developing a plan of action.

==== Terrorism ====
Though there have been no terrorism-related incidents in the country since the Jamaat al Muslimeen coup attempt in 1990, Trinidad and Tobago remains a potential target and it is estimated that roughly 100 citizens of the country have traveled to the Middle East to fight for the Islamic State. In 2017, the government adopted a counter-terrorism and extremism strategy. In 2018, a terror threat at the Trinidad and Tobago Carnival was thwarted by law enforcement.

==== Trinidad and Tobago Prison Service ====
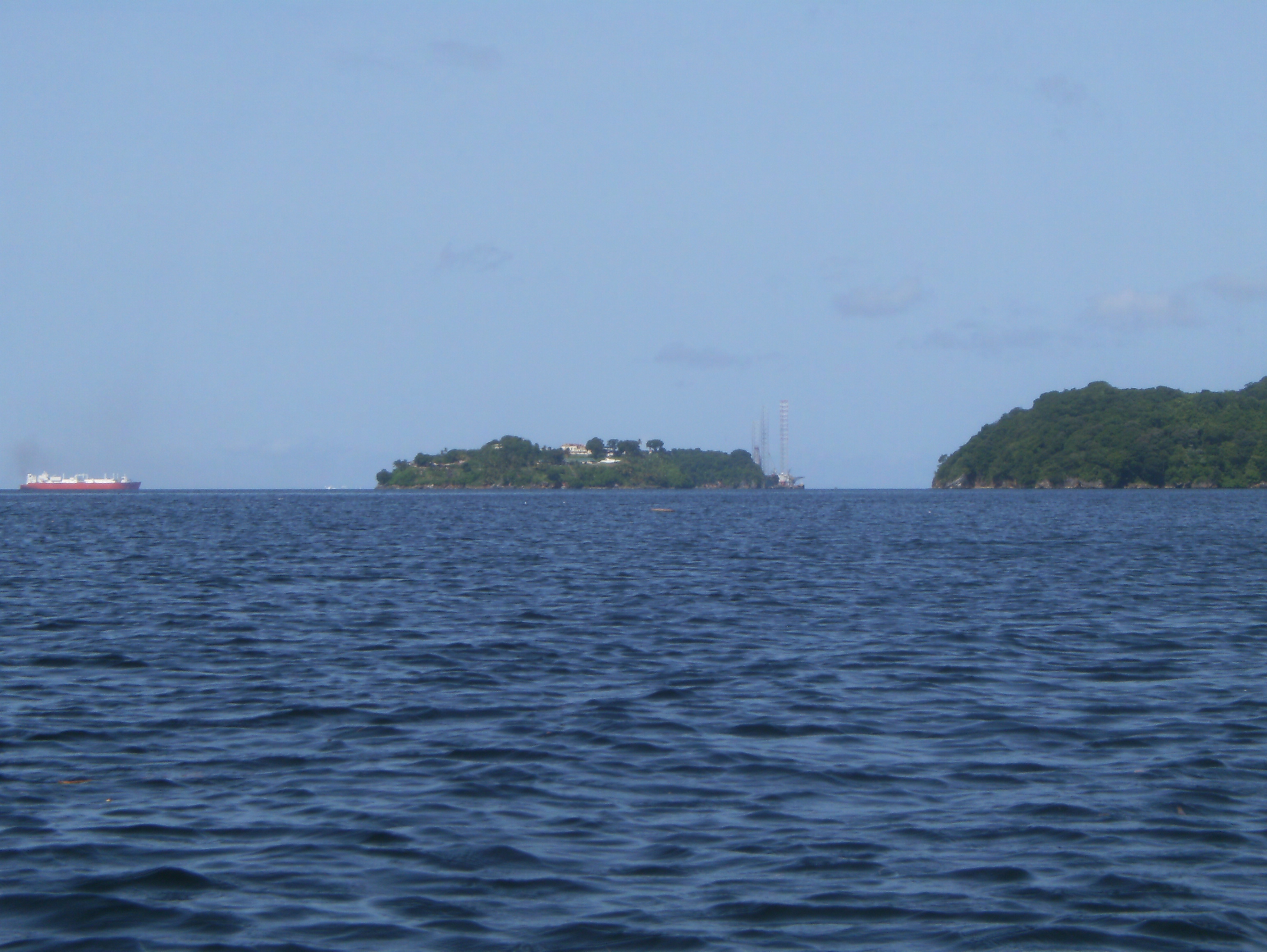
Trinidad prison on Carrera Island

The country's prison administration is the Trinidad and Tobago Prison Service (TTPrS), it is currently under the control of the Commissioner of Prisons (Ag.) Hayden Forde, who replaced Carlos Corraspe, located in Port-of-Spain. The prison population rate is 292 people per 100,000. The total prison population, including pre-trial detainees and remand prisoners, is 3,999 prisoners. The population rate of pre-trial detainees and remand prisoners is 174 per 100,000 of the national population (59.7% of the prison population). In 2018, the female prison population rate is 8.5 per 100,000 of the national population (2.9% of the prison population). Prisoners that are minors makes up 1.9% of the prison population and foreign prisoners make 0.8% of the prison population.

The occupancy level of Trinidad and Tobago's prison system is at 81.8% capacity as of 2019. Trinidad and Tobago has nine prison establishments; Golden Grove Prison, Maximum Security Prison, Port of Spain Prison, Eastern Correctional Rehabilitation Centre, Remand Prison, Tobago Convict Prison, Carrera Convict Island Prison, Women's Prison and Youth Training and Rehabilitation Centre. Trinidad and Tobago also use labour yards as prisons, or means of punishment.

=== Disaster management and response ===
Trinidad and Tobago, situated in a region susceptible to natural disasters like earthquakes, hurricanes, and flooding, as well as man-made disasters such as oil spills, has a multi-layered disaster management system.

==== Local response ====
The Ministry of Rural Development and Local Government, along with regional and municipal corporations, are the first responders to major disasters. Each corporation maintains a Disaster Management Unit (DMU) responsible for managing all phases of extreme weather events within their local area. In Tobago, the Tobago Emergency Management Agency (TEMA), under the Tobago House of Assembly, handles disaster and emergency management. The Trinidad and Tobago Fire Service acts as the primary emergency response agency.

==== National coordination ====
The Office of Disaster Preparedness and Management (ODPM), under the Ministry of Homeland Security, serves as the strategic coordinating agency. It plans, prepares, coordinates, and manages disaster response for the entire nation, and also coordinates Trinidad and Tobago's response to regional disasters.

==== Specialised response ====
The Ministry of Energy and Energy Industries is responsible for the National Oil Spill Contingency Plan, coordinating all efforts related to oil spills on land and sea.

== Economy ==
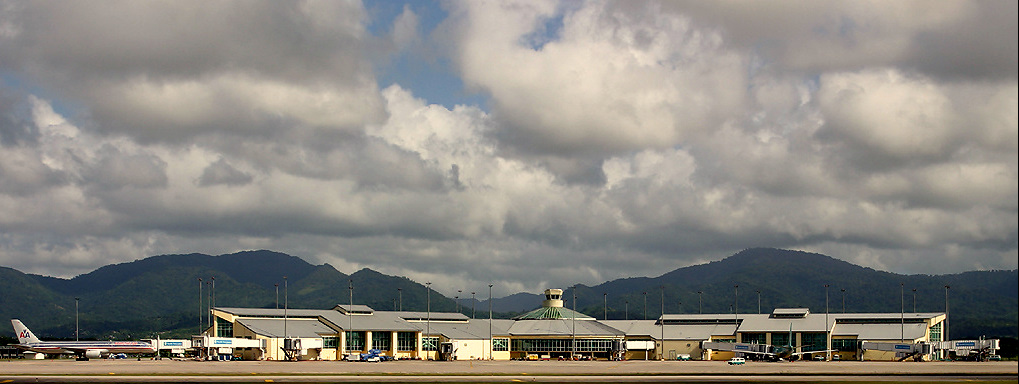
Piarco International Airport

Trinidad and Tobago is the most developed nation and one of the wealthiest in the Caribbean and is listed in the top 40 (2010 information) of the 70 high-income countries in the world. Its gross national income per capita of US$18,967 (2025 gross national income at Atlas Method) is one of the highest in the Caribbean. In November 2011, the OECD removed Trinidad and Tobago from its list of developing countries. Trinidad's economy is strongly influenced by the petroleum industry. Tourism and manufacturing are also important to the local economy. Tourism is a growing sector, particularly on Tobago, although proportionately it is much less important than in many other Caribbean islands. Agricultural products include citrus and cocoa. It also supplies manufactured goods, notably food, beverages, and cement, to the Caribbean region.

=== Oil and gas ===
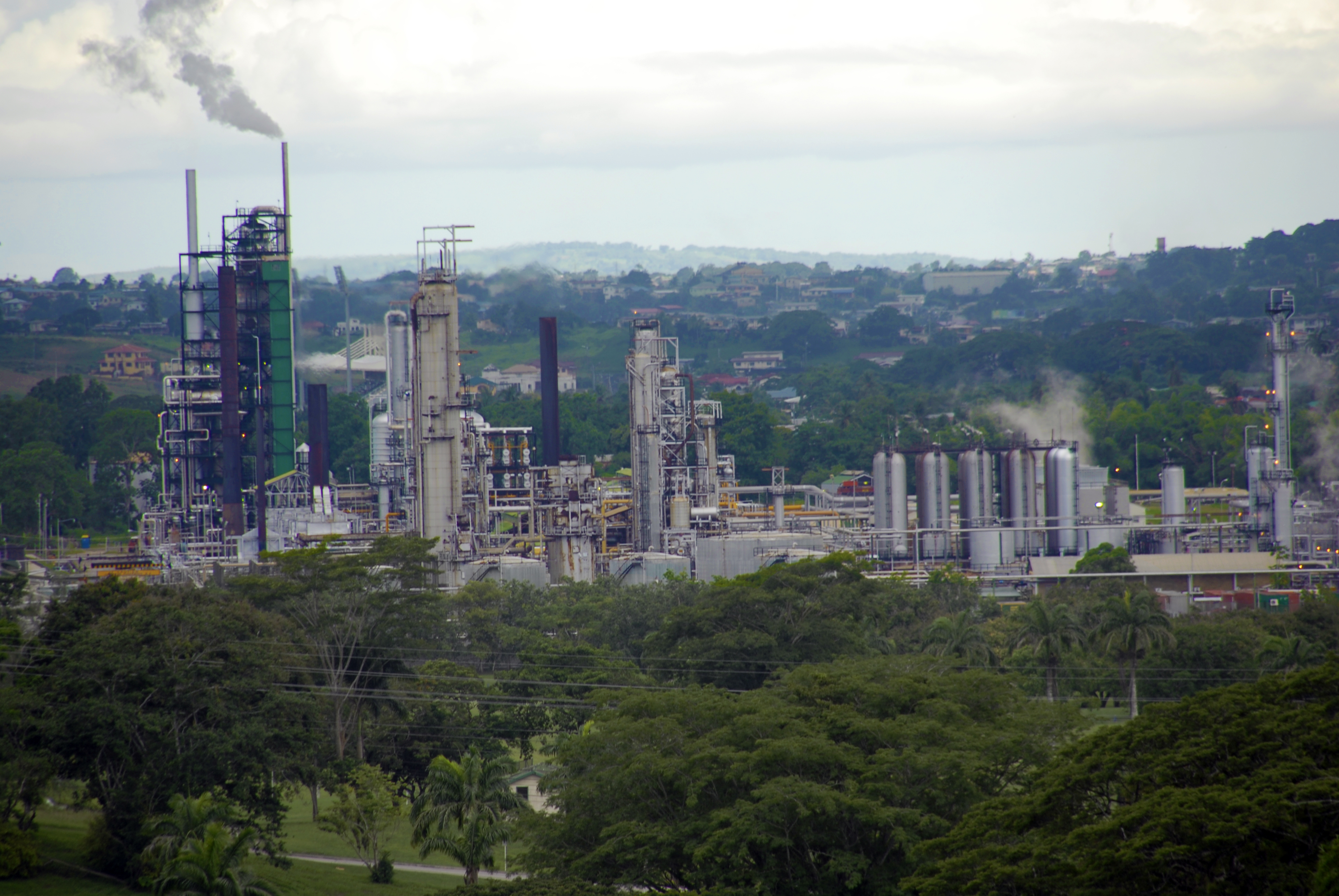
The oil refinery at Pointe-à-Pierre. A strong petrochemical and oil industry has boosted the economy and the country is less reliant on tourism or agriculture.

Trinidad and Tobago is the leading Caribbean producer of oil and gas, and its economy is heavily dependent upon these resources. Oil and gas account for about 40% of GDP and 80% of exports, but only 5% of employment. Recent growth has been fuelled by investments in liquefied natural gas (LNG), petrochemicals, and steel. Additional petrochemical, aluminium, and plastics projects are in various stages of planning.

The country is also a regional financial centre, and the economy has a growing trade surplus. The expansion of Atlantic LNG over the past six years created the largest single-sustained phase of economic growth in Trinidad and Tobago. The nation is an exporter of LNG and supplied a total of 13.4 billion m^{3} in 2017. The largest markets for Trinidad and Tobago's LNG exports are Chile and the United States.

Trinidad and Tobago has transitioned from an oil-based economy to a natural gas based economy. In 2017, natural gas production totalled 18.5 billion m^{3}, a decrease of 0.4% from 2016 with 18.6 billion m^{3} of production. Oil production has decreased over the past decade from 7.1 million metric tonnes per year in 2007 to 4.4 million metric tonnes per year in 2017. In December 2005, the Atlantic LNG's fourth production module or "train" for liquefied natural gas (LNG) began production. Train four has increased Atlantic LNG's overall output capacity by almost 50% and is the largest LNG train in the world at 5.2 million tons/year of LNG. According to an article in the Trinidad Guardian, South Korea imported methanol from Trinidad and Tobago to the amount of US$286 million in 2022 and US$186 million in 2023.

=== Tourism ===
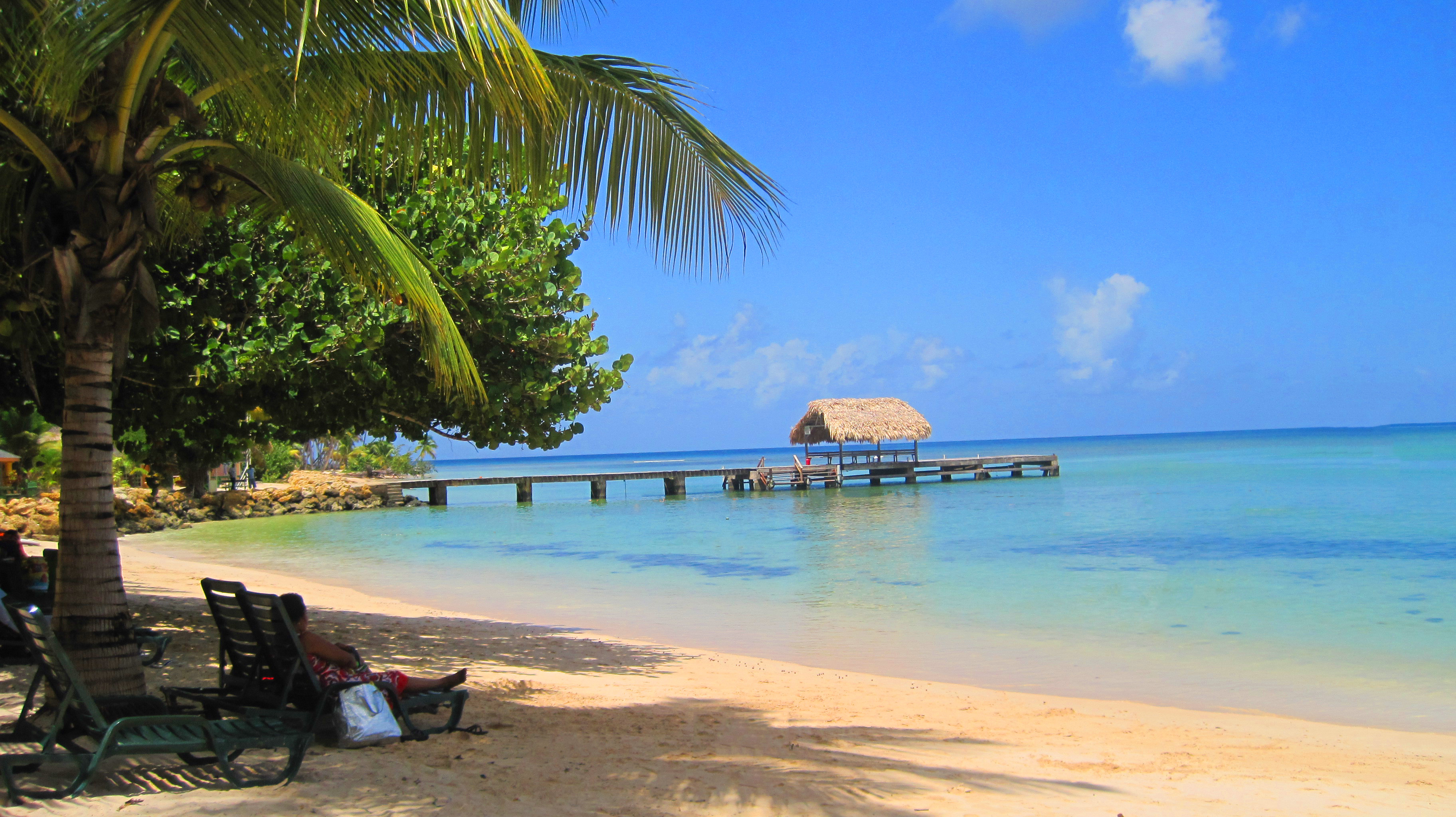
Tourists at Pigeon Point beach, Tobago

Trinidad and Tobago is far less dependent on tourism than many other Caribbean countries and territories, with the bulk of tourist activity occurring on Tobago. The government has made efforts to boost this sector in recent years.

Some of the attractions of the island are its street food culture and cultural events, and Aripita Avenue in Port of Spain is one noted place for this.

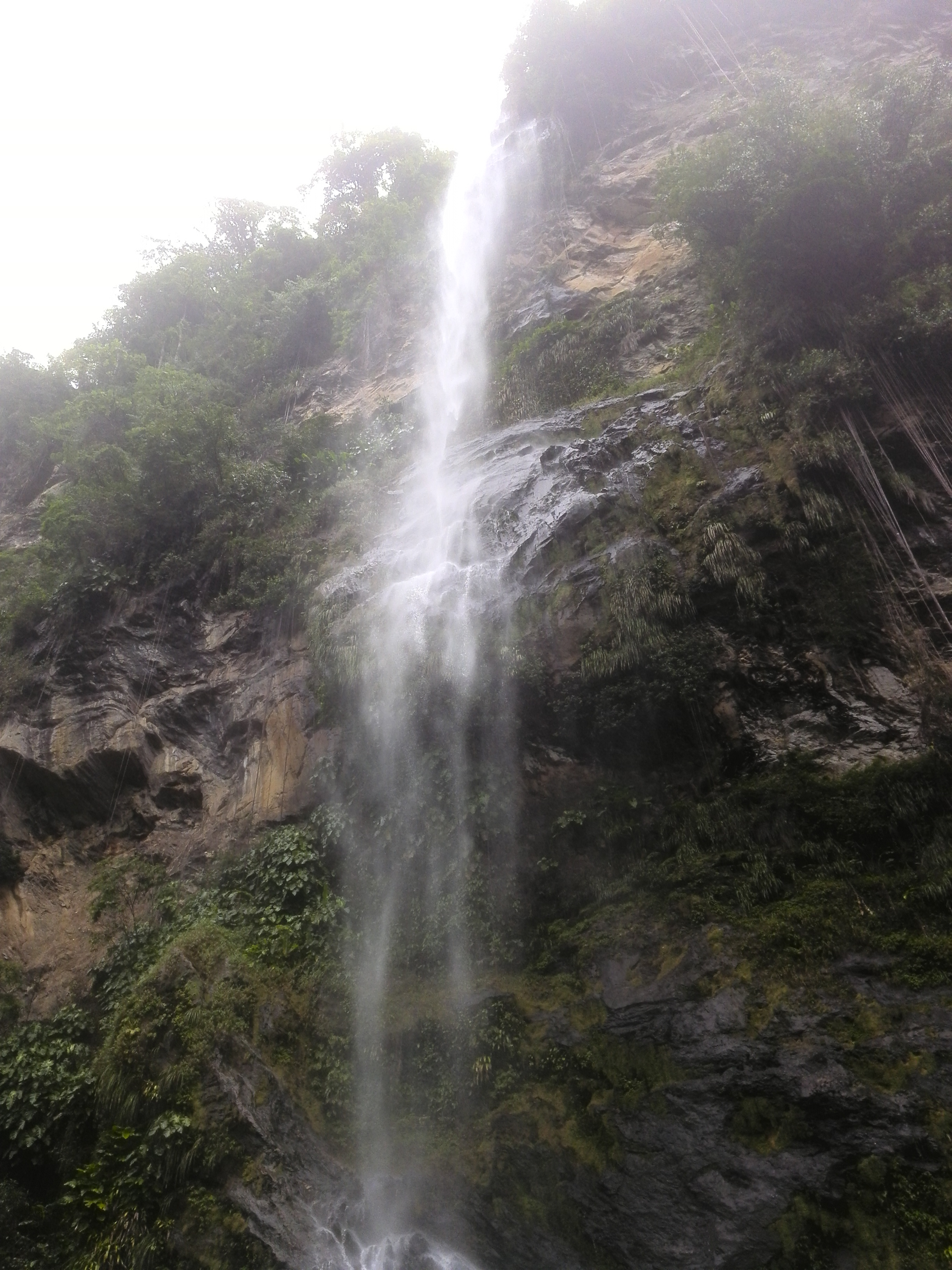
Maracas Falls is over 90 meter and the tallest fall in the country; see Maracas Valley.

=== Agriculture ===
Historically agricultural production including sugar and coffee dominated the economy, with sugar cane earning the most money, and providing the most employment. Some of the sugar produced was eaten in Trinidad but most of it was sold to United Kingdom, Canada, and United States. Cocoa was the second most valuable crop, and covers more area than sugar cane. Sugar production ceased around 2010 or so due to deflated prices of the time and high production costs.

Most farmers grow cocoa to sell to other countries that cannot grow it themselves. Trinidad was once the second biggest producer of cocoa after Ecuador, but this would not last long. As countries in West Africa and South America began growing cocoa at a lower price, Trinidad lost many of its customers.

Agriculture has been in steep decline since the 20th century and now forms just 0.4% of the country's GDP and employs 3.1% of the workforce. Various fruits and vegetables are grown, such as cucumbers, eggplant, cassava, pumpkin, dasheen (taro) and coconut, and fishing is still also commonly practised.

=== Economic diversification ===
Trinidad and Tobago, in an effort to undergo economic transformation through diversification, formed InvesTT in 2012 to serve as the country's sole investment promotion agency. This agency is aligned to the Ministry of Trade and Industry and is to be the key agent in growing the country's non-oil and gas sectors significantly and sustainably.

=== Food and beverage industry ===
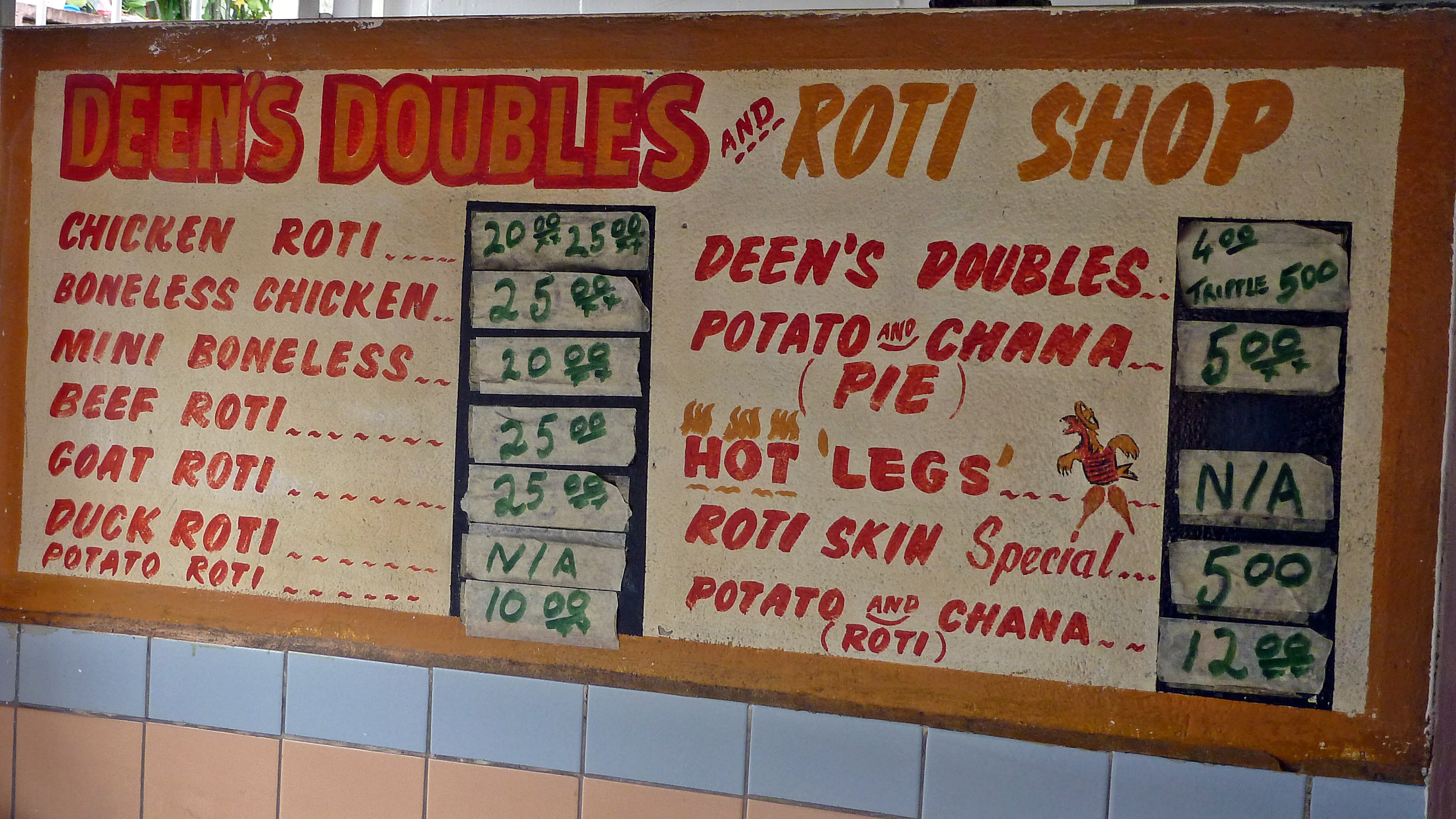
Many restaurants serve Trinidad and Tobago dishes such as Roti or doubles. Fresh cut coconut water and jelly is another popular item.

Trinidad and Tobago is home to the largest brewery company in CARICOM, the Carib Brewery. It also has a number of food production facilities including a Nestle plant. Because the island has less land and a higher income than average there is a tendency to import food, nevertheless there is local production of many products including milk, chocolate, coconuts, and alcoholic beverages among others. In 2022, the output of the food, beverage, and tobacco industry was almost 8 billion Trinidadian dollars.

An example of a restaurant chain in Trinidad and Tobago is Royal Castle.

=== Communications infrastructure ===
Trinidad and Tobago has a well developed communications sector. The telecommunications and broadcasting sectors generated an estimated TT$5.63 billion (US$0.88 billion) in 2014, which as a percentage of GDP equates to 3.1 percent. This represented a 1.9 percent increase in total revenues generated by this industry compared to last year. Of total telecommunications and broadcasting revenues, mobile voice services accounted for the majority of revenues with TT$2.20 billion (39.2 percent). This was followed by internet services which contributed TT$1.18 billion or 21.1 percent. The next highest revenue earners for the industry were fixed voice services and paid television services whose contributions totalled TT$0.76 billion and TT$0.70 billion respectively (13.4 percent and 12.4 percent). International voice services was next in line, generating TT$0.27 billion (4.7 percent) in revenues. Free-to Air radio and television services contributed TT$0.18 billion and TT$0.13 billion respectively (3.2 percent and 2.4 percent). Finally, other contributors included "other revenues" and "leased line services" with earnings of TT$0.16 billion and TT$0.05 billion respectively, with 2.8 percent and 0.9 percent.

There are several providers for each segment of the telecommunications market. Fixed Lines Telephone service is provided by Digicel, TSTT (operating as bmobile) and Cable & Wireless Communications operating as FLOW; cellular service is provided by TSTT (operating as bmobile) and Digicel whilst internet service is provided by TSTT, FLOW, Digicel, Green Dot and Lisa Communications.

=== Creative industries ===
The Government of Trinidad and Tobago has recognised the creative industries as a pathway to economic growth and development. It is one of the newest, most dynamic sectors where creativity, knowledge and intangibles serve as the basic productive resource. In 2015, the Trinidad and Tobago Creative Industries Company Limited (CreativeTT) was established as a state agency under the Ministry of Trade and Industry with a mandate to stimulate and facilitate the business development and export activities of the Creative Industries in Trinidad and Tobago to generate national wealth, and, as such, the company is responsible for the strategic and business development of the three niche areas and sub sectors currently under its purview – Music, Film and Fashion. MusicTT, FilmTT and FashionTT are the subsidiaries established to fulfil this mandate.

=== Transport ===
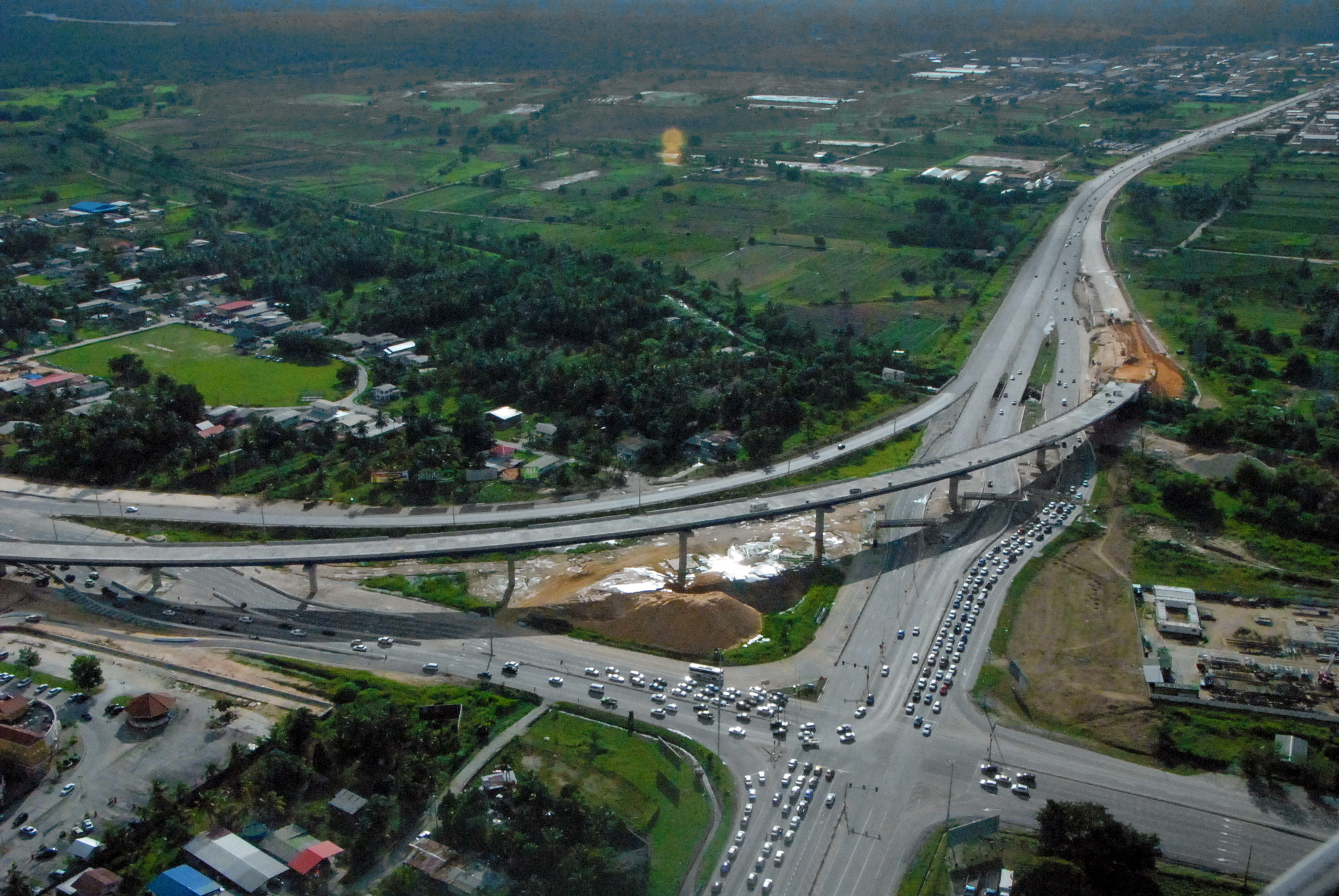
An intersection of Churchill–Roosevelt Highway and Uriah Butler Highway, 2009

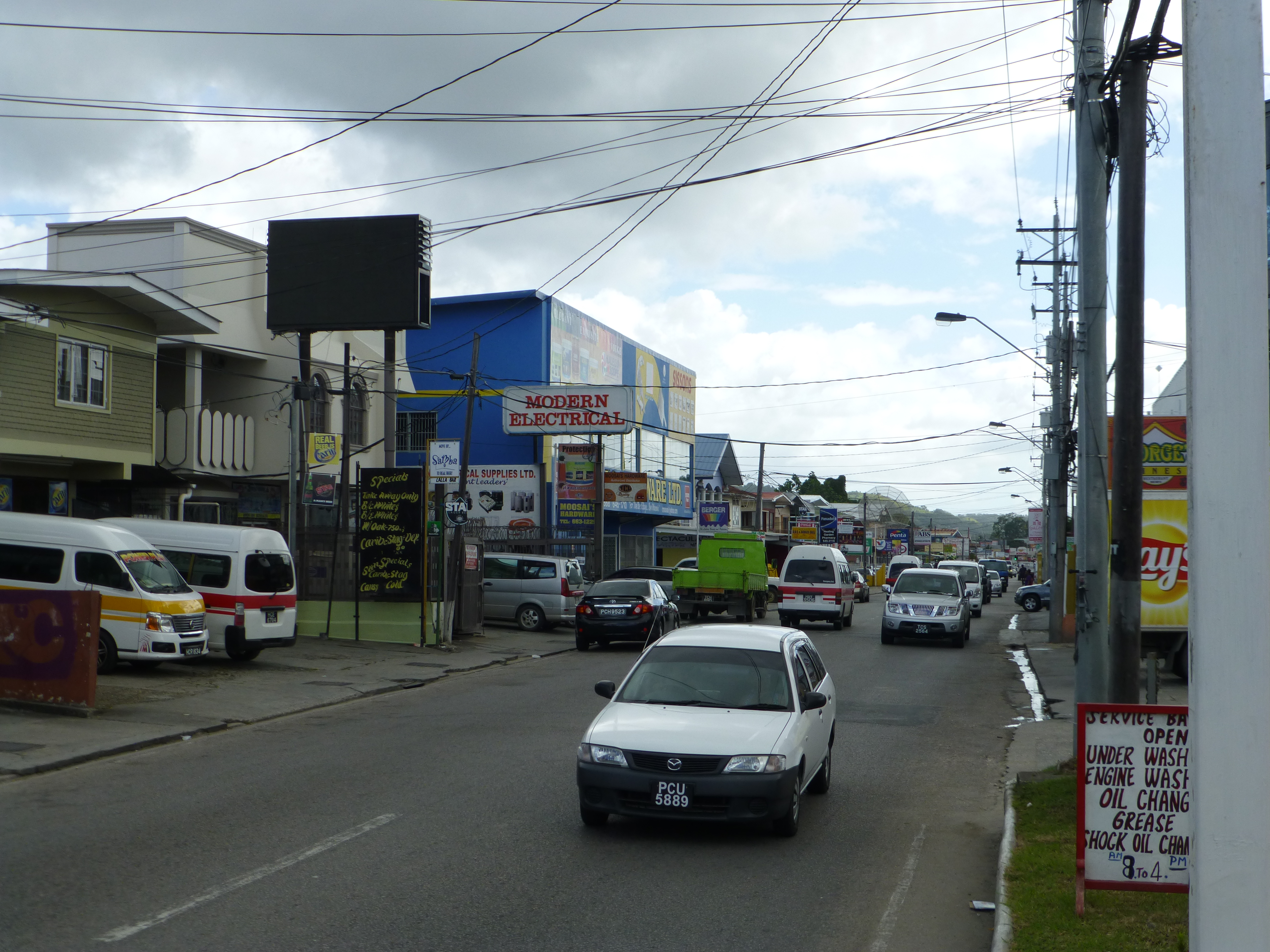
Traffic drives on the left side of road.

The transport system in Trinidad and Tobago consists of a dense network of highways and roads across both major islands, ferries connecting Port of Spain with Scarborough and San Fernando, and international airports on both islands. The Uriah Butler Highway, Churchill Roosevelt Highway and the Sir Solomon Hochoy Highway links the island of Trinidad together, whereas the Claude Noel Highway is the only major highway in Tobago. Public transportation options on land are public buses, private taxis and minibuses. By sea, the options are inter-island ferries and inter-city water taxis.

The island of Trinidad is served by Piarco International Airport located in Piarco, which opened on 8 January 1931. Sitting at an elevation of 17.4 metres (57 ft) above sea level, it comprises an area of 680 hectares (1,700 acres) and has a runway of 3,200 metres (10,500 ft). The airport consists of two terminals, the North Terminal and the South Terminal. The older South Terminal underwent renovations in 2009 for use as a VIP entrance point during the fifth Summit of the Americas. The North Terminal was completed in 2001, and consists of 14-second-level aircraft gates with jetways for international flights, two ground-level domestic gates and 82 ticket counter positions. Piarco International Airport was named the Best Airport in the Caribbean in 2023 by international air transport rating organisation Skytrax. According to the Trinidad and Tobago Guardian "This is the third consecutive year that Piarco has copped this award."

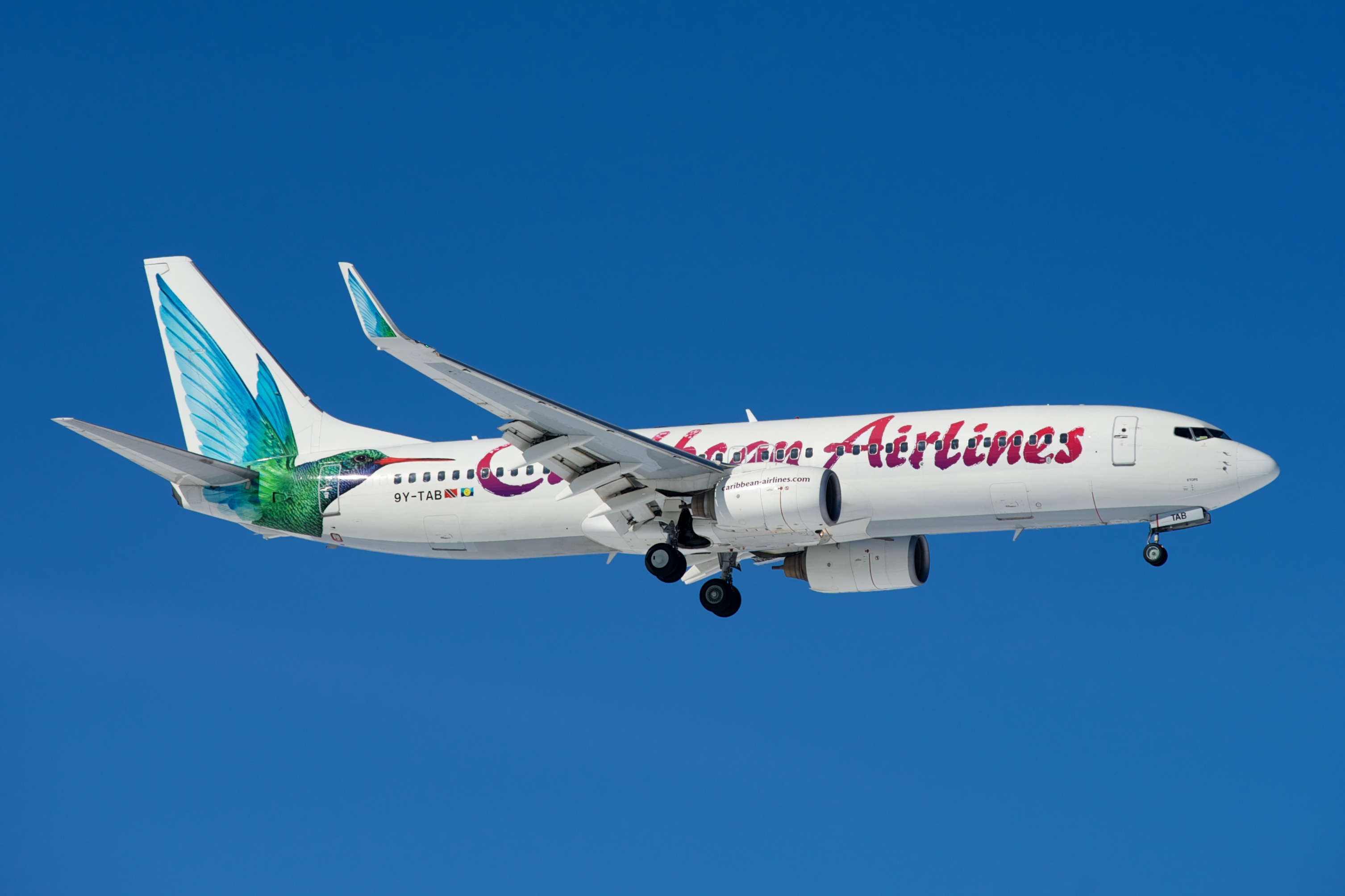
The state-owned Caribbean Airlines is the largest in the region.

In 2008, the passenger throughput at Piarco International Airport was approximately 2.6 million. It is the seventh busiest airport in the Caribbean and the third busiest in the English-speaking Caribbean, after Sangster International Airport and Lynden Pindling International Airport. Caribbean Airlines, the national airline, operates its main hub at the Piarco International Airport and services the Caribbean, the United States, Canada and South America. The airline is wholly owned by the Government of Trinidad and Tobago. After an additional cash injection of US$50 million, the Trinidad and Tobago government acquired the Jamaican airline Air Jamaica on 1 May 2010, with a 6–12-month transition period to follow.

The Island of Tobago is served by the A.N.R. Robinson International Airport in Crown Point. This airport has regular services to North America and Europe. There are regular flights between the two islands, with fares being heavily subsidised by the Government.

Trinidad was formerly home to a railway network, however this was closed down in 1968. There have been talks to build a new railway on the islands, though nothing yet has come of this.

According to an article in the Trinidad Guardian, Trinidad and Tobago has about 500 vehicles for every 1000 persons. It also gives a Central Bank estimate of US$300.8 million spent by automotive companies in 2024 with around 13% being for vehicle imports from South Korea.

=== Energy policy and climate change ===
Trinidad and Tobago is the region's leading exporter of oil and gas but imports of fossil fuels provided over 90% of the energy consumed by its CARICOM neighbours in 2008. This vulnerability led CARICOM to develop an Energy Policy which was approved in 2013. This policy is accompanied by the CARICOM Sustainable Energy Roadmap and Strategy (C-SERMS). Under the policy, renewable energy sources are to contribute 20% of the total electricity generation mix in member states by 2017, 28% by 2022 and 47% by 2027.

In 2014 Trinidad and Tobago was the third country in the world which emitted the most CO_{2} per capita after Qatar and Curacao according to the World Bank. On average, each inhabitant produced 34.2 metric tons of CO_{2} in the atmosphere. In comparison, the world average was 5.0 tons per capita the same year. Over recent years CO_{2} emissions have declined, so that in 2021 at 21.01 tonnes per capita, Trinidad and Tobago ranked fourth, after the tiny countries smaller than half a million, such as Curacao, are excluded, and is the only non-Middle East country in the remaining worst seven CO_{2} emitters on a per capita basis.

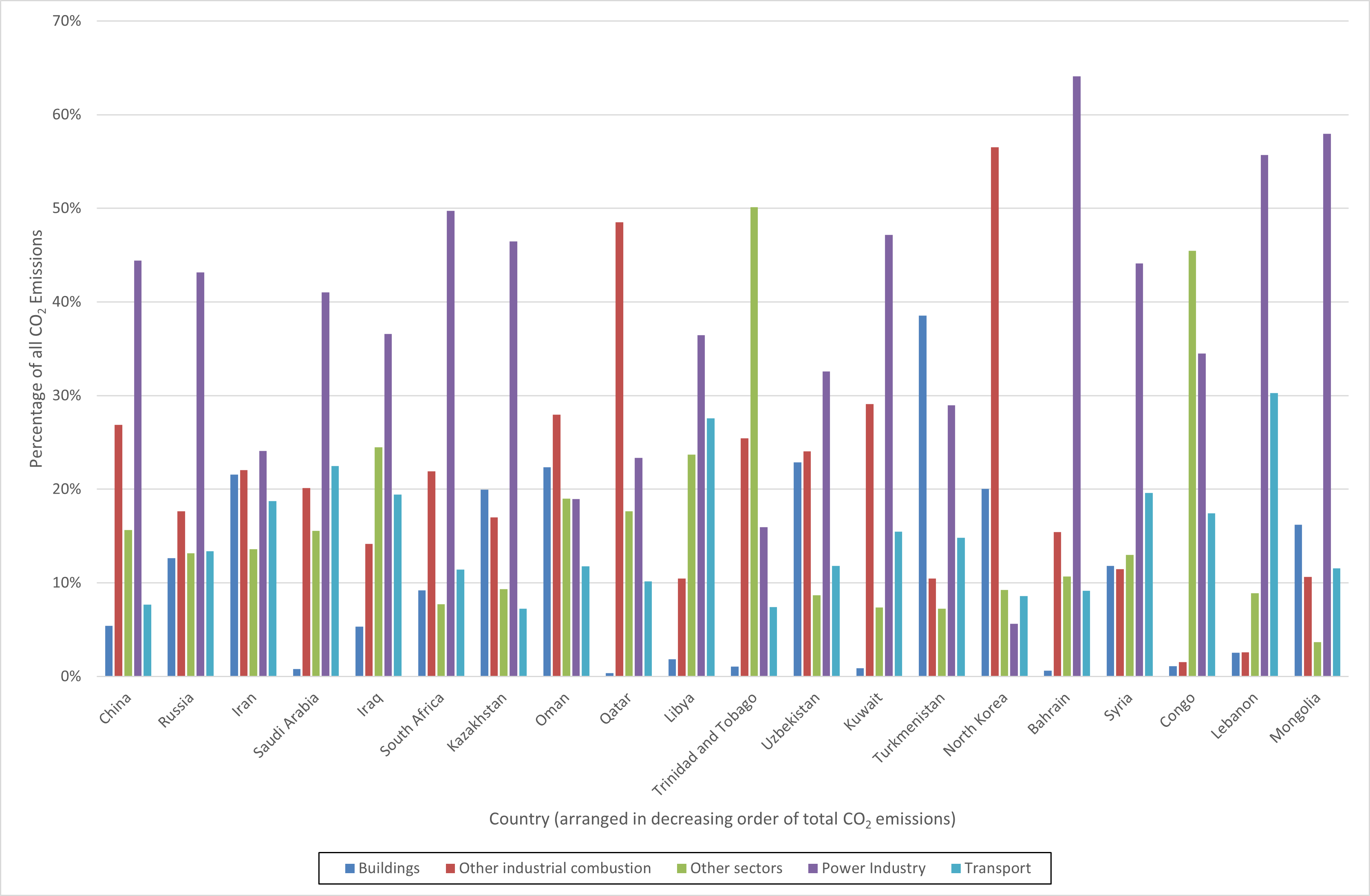
Activity sectoral profile of worst 20 CO_{2} intensity emitters. Data:

In terms of emissions intensity of economy (defined as CO_{2} emissions per unit of GDP), Trinidad and Tobago ranked third globally. Its emissions-source profile is unique amongst the worst CO_{2} intensity emitters as the so-called "other sectors", which includes: industrial process emissions, agricultural soils and waste, accounts for more than fifty per cent of fossil CO_{2} emissions, rather than the power industry, other industrial combustion, transport and buildings sectors.

The Caribbean Industrial Research Institute in Trinidad and Tobago facilitates climate change research and provides industrial support for R&D related to food security. It also carries out equipment testing and calibration for major industries.

== Demographics ==
The population of the country estimated at between 1.4 to 1.5 million by the mid 2020s.

=== Urban centres ===
Largest cities or towns in Trinidad and Tobago 2011 Census*
Rank	Name	Municipality	Pop.	Rank	Name	Municipality	Pop.
1	Chaguanas	Borough of Chaguanas	101,297	11	Sangre Grande	Region of Sangre Grande	20,630
2	San Fernando	City of San Fernando	82,997	12	Penal	Region of Penal–Debe	17,952
3	Port of Spain	City of Port of Spain	81,142	13	Scarborough	Tobago	17,537
4	Arima	The Royal Chartered Borough of Arima	65,623	14	Gasparillo	Region of Couva–Tabaquite–Talparo	16,426
5	San Juan	Region of San Juan–Laventille	53,588	15	Siparia	Borough of Siparia	14,535
6	Diego Martin	Borough of Diego Martin	49,686	16	Claxton Bay	Region of Couva–Tabaquite–Talparo	14,436
7	Couva	Region of Couva–Tabaquite–Talparo	48,858	17	Fyzabad	Borough of Siparia	13,099
8	Point Fortin	Republic Borough of Point Fortin	29,579	18	Valencia	Region of Sangre Grande	12,327
9	Princes Town	Region of Princes Town	28,335	19	Freeport	Region of Couva–Tabaquite–Talparo	11,850
10	Tunapuna	Region of Tunapuna–Piarco	26,829	20	Debe	Region of Penal–Debe	11,733

=== Ethnic groups ===
Ethnic groups of Trinidad and Tobago (2011)
Ethnic groups	percent
Indian	35.4%
African	34.2%
Mixed	22.8%
Unspecified	6.2%
Other	1.3%

Racial plurality by region

Largest ethnic group of each region

The ethnic composition of Trinidad and Tobago reflects a history of conquest and immigration. While the earliest inhabitants were of indigenous heritage, the two dominant groups in the country are now those of Indian-South Asian heritage and those of sub-Saharan African heritage.

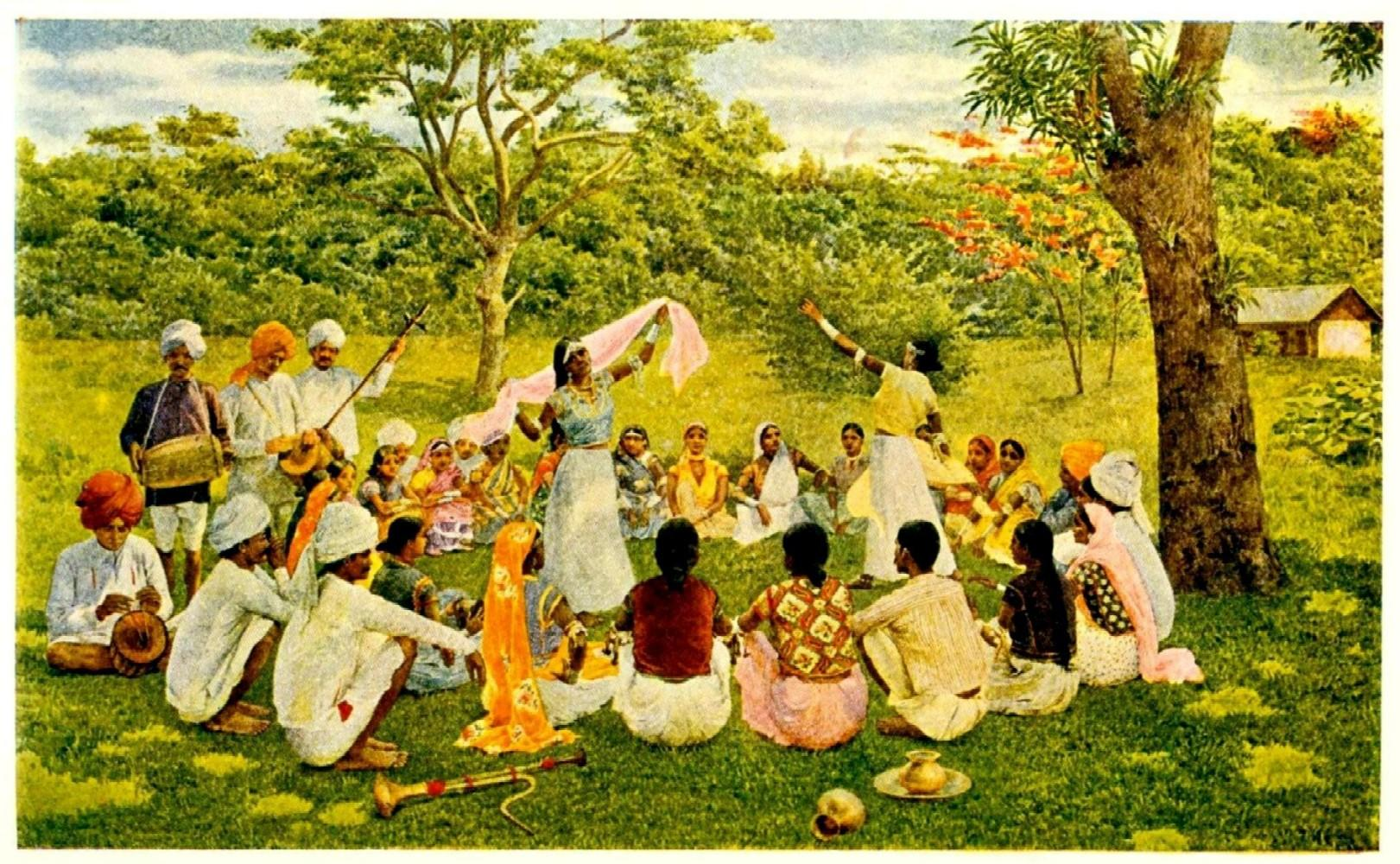
Painting of Indo-Trinidadians on an estate in the early 20th century

Indo-Trinidadian and Tobagonians make up the country's largest ethnic group (approximately 35.4%); they are primarily the descendants of indentured workers from India, brought to replace freed (formerly enslaved) Afro–Trinidadians who refused to continue working on the sugar plantations. Through cultural preservation many residents of Indian descent continue to maintain traditions from their ancestral homeland. Indo-Trinidadians reside primarily on Trinidad; as of the 2011 census only 2.5% of Tobago's population was of Indian descent.

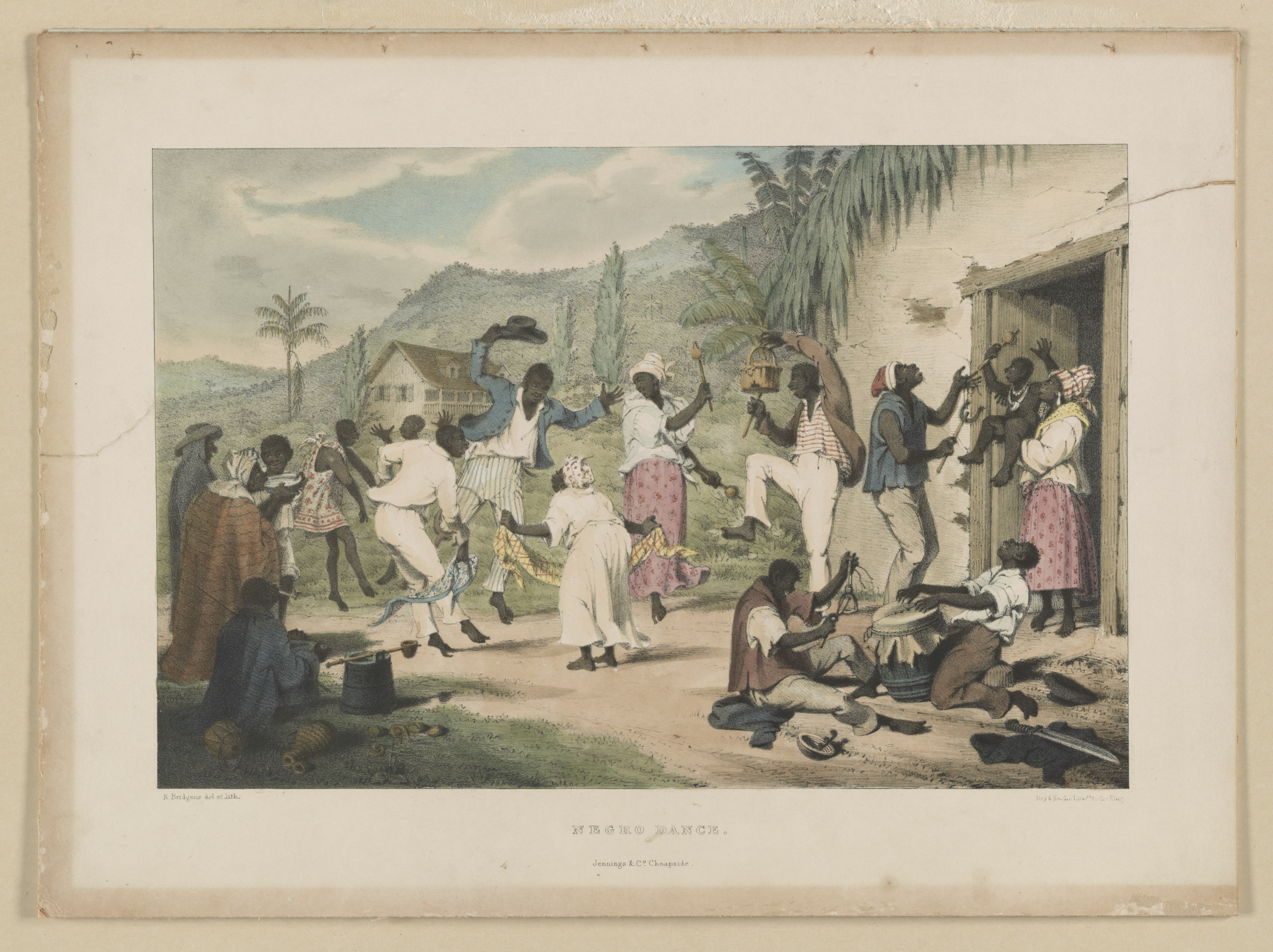
Lithograph of Afro-Trinidadians in the mid-19th century

Afro-Trinidadians make up the country's second largest ethnic group, with approximately 34.2% of the population identifying as being of African descent. The majority of people of an African background are the descendants of enslaved West Africans forcibly transported to the islands from as early as the 16th century. This group constitute the majority on Tobago, at 85.2%.

The bulk of the rest of the population are those who identify as being of mixed heritage which equates to 23% of the population. There are also small but significant minorities of people of Indigenous, Portuguese, other European, Latin American, Chinese, and Arab descent.

Arima in Trinidad is a noted centre of First Peoples' culture, including as the headquarters of the Carib Queen and the location of the Santa Rosa First Peoples Community.

There is a Cocoa Panyol community in Trinidad and Tobago whose ancestors were migrant labourers of mixed Spanish, indigenous, and African descent who came from Venezuela between the late 19th and early 20th century to work on the cocoa estates.

=== Languages ===
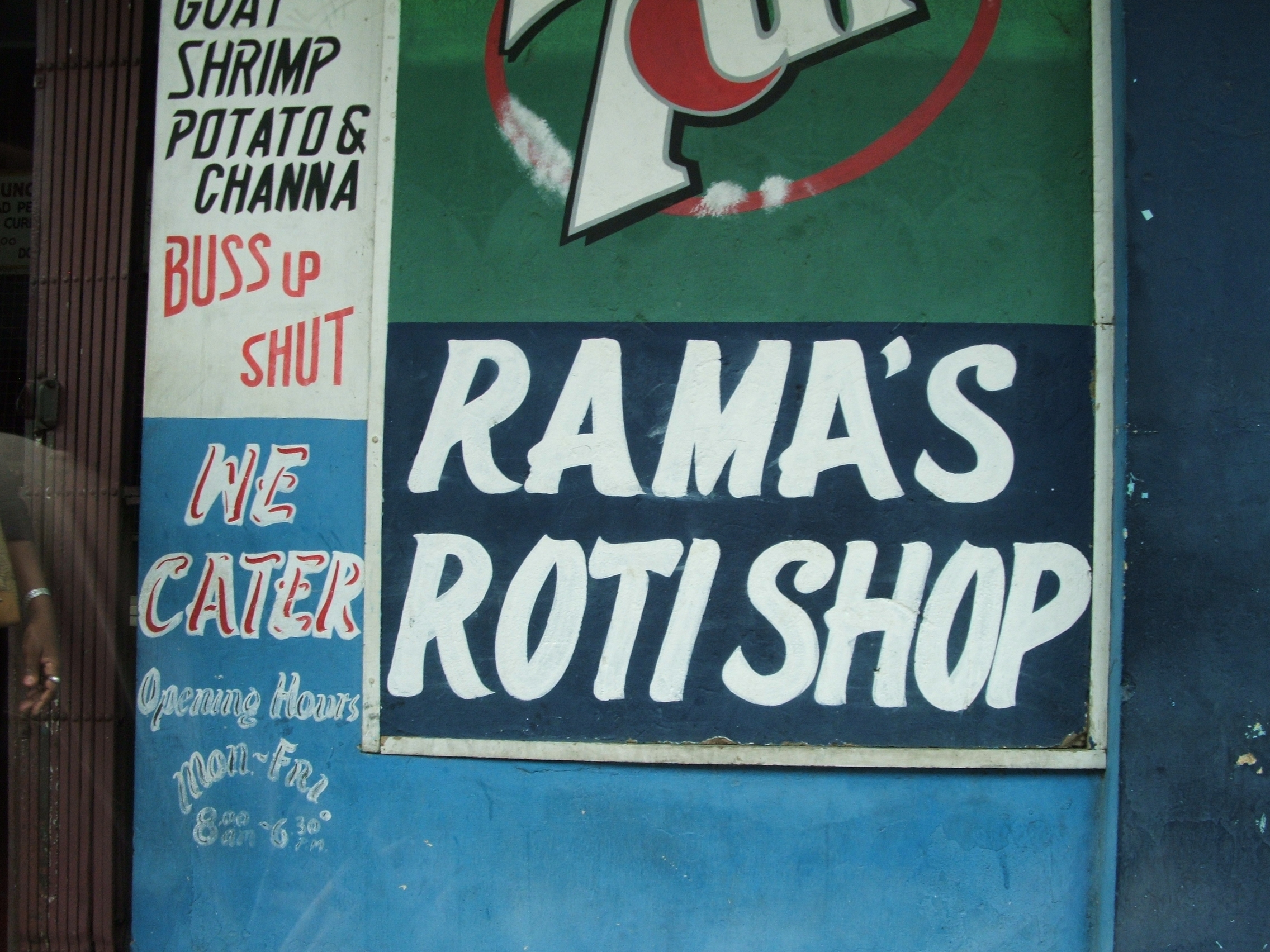
Roti shop sign in English in Port of Spain; buss up shut is a Creole name for paratha.

English is the official language. Trinidadian English Creole and Tobagonian English Creole the vernaculars spoken in Trinidad and Tobago, respectively. The heritage and minority languages on the islands are Trinidadian Hindustani, Trinidadian French Creole (Patois), Spanish, Chinese, Yoruba, Arabic, and Portuguese.

The indigenous languages that are extinct are Yao on Trinidad and Karina on Tobago, both Cariban, and Shebaya on Trinidad, which was Arawakan. These languages have been extinct for over a century, but there are attempts to revive the Carib language by the Santa Rosa First Peoples Community.

=== Religion ===
Religion in Trinidad and Tobago (2020)
Religion	Percent
Christianity	55.2%
Hinduism	18.2%
Islam	5.0%
Other religions	8.3%
None/Not stated	13.3%

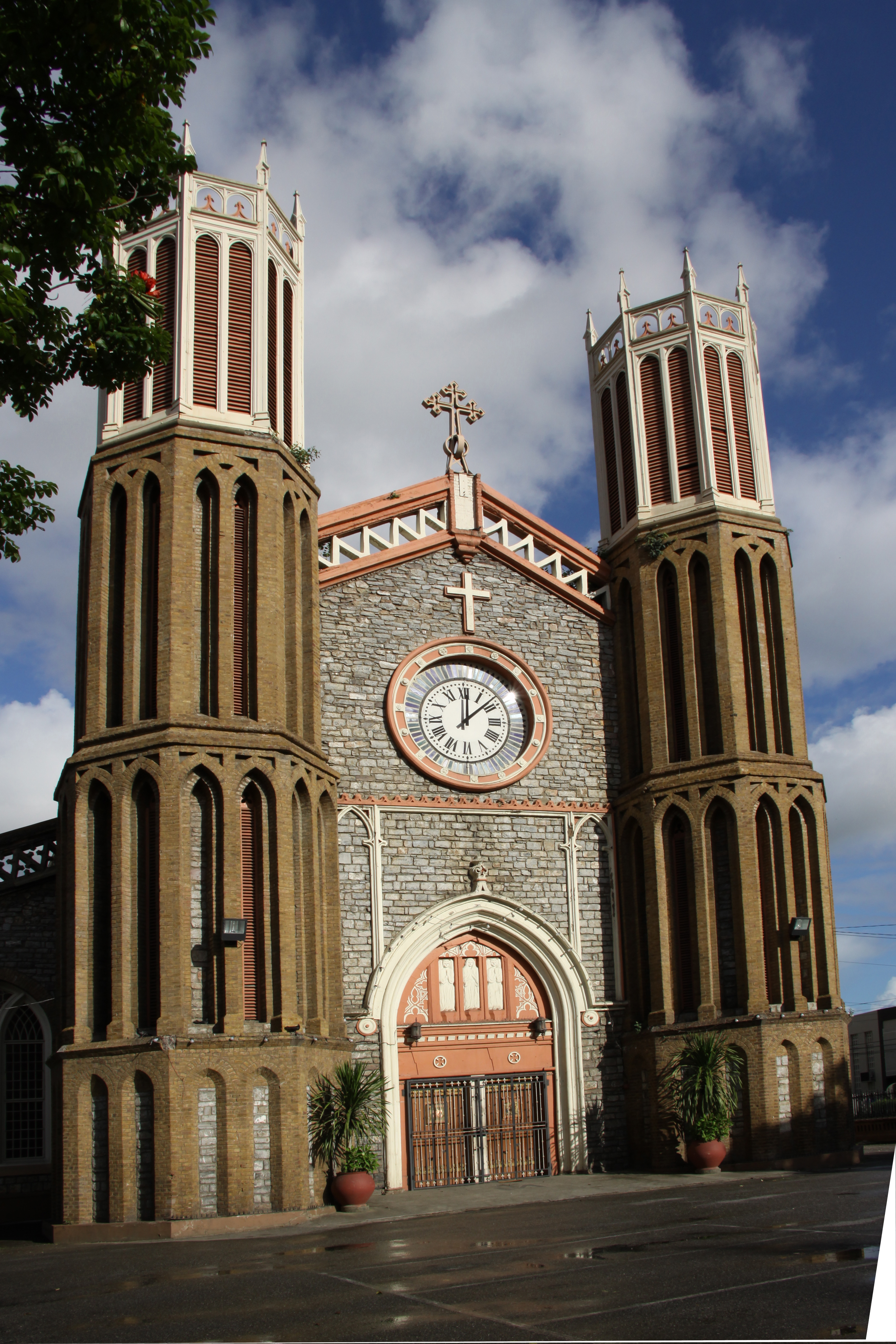
The Cathedral of the Immaculate Conception (Port of Spain) in Port of Spain, a major landmark of Roman Catholicism in Trinidad and Tobago

Trinidad and Tobago is religiously diverse, with the population practicing a wide range of faiths. As of 2020, Christianity remains the largest religion, followed by Hinduism and Islam.

Christianity is followed by around 65.9% of the population. Major Christian denominations include Roman Catholics, Pentecostals, Anglicans, Baptists, Seventh-day Adventists, Presbyterians, Methodists, Jehovah's Witnesses and Moravians. Hinduism, practiced by approximately 22.7%, is the second-largest religion. It is most visible in Indo-Trinidadian communities, especially in central Trinidad. Diwali is a national holiday, and numerous Hindu organisations are active, most prominently the Sanatan Dharma Maha Sabha and Arya Samaj. Islam is practiced by 5.9% of the population, mainly among Indo-Trinidadians and Afro-Trinidadians. Eid al-Fitr is a national holiday, and other Muslim observances such as Eid al-Adha and Hosay are widely recognised. Other religions include Rastafari, Spiritual Baptist, and Trinidad Orisha faiths, as well as Baháʼí, Buddhism, Sikhism, and Judaism. The Jewish population is small, with about 55 individuals as of 2007. Around 3.6% of the population are either non-religious or did not state a religion.

=== Education ===
Children generally start pre-school at two and a half years but this is not mandatory. They are, however, expected to have basic reading and writing skills when they commence primary school. Students begin primary school at age five and move on to secondary after seven years. The seven classes of primary school consists of First Year and Second Year, followed by Standard One through Standard Five. During the final year of primary school, students prepare for and sit the Secondary Entrance Assessment (SEA) which determines the secondary school the child will attend.

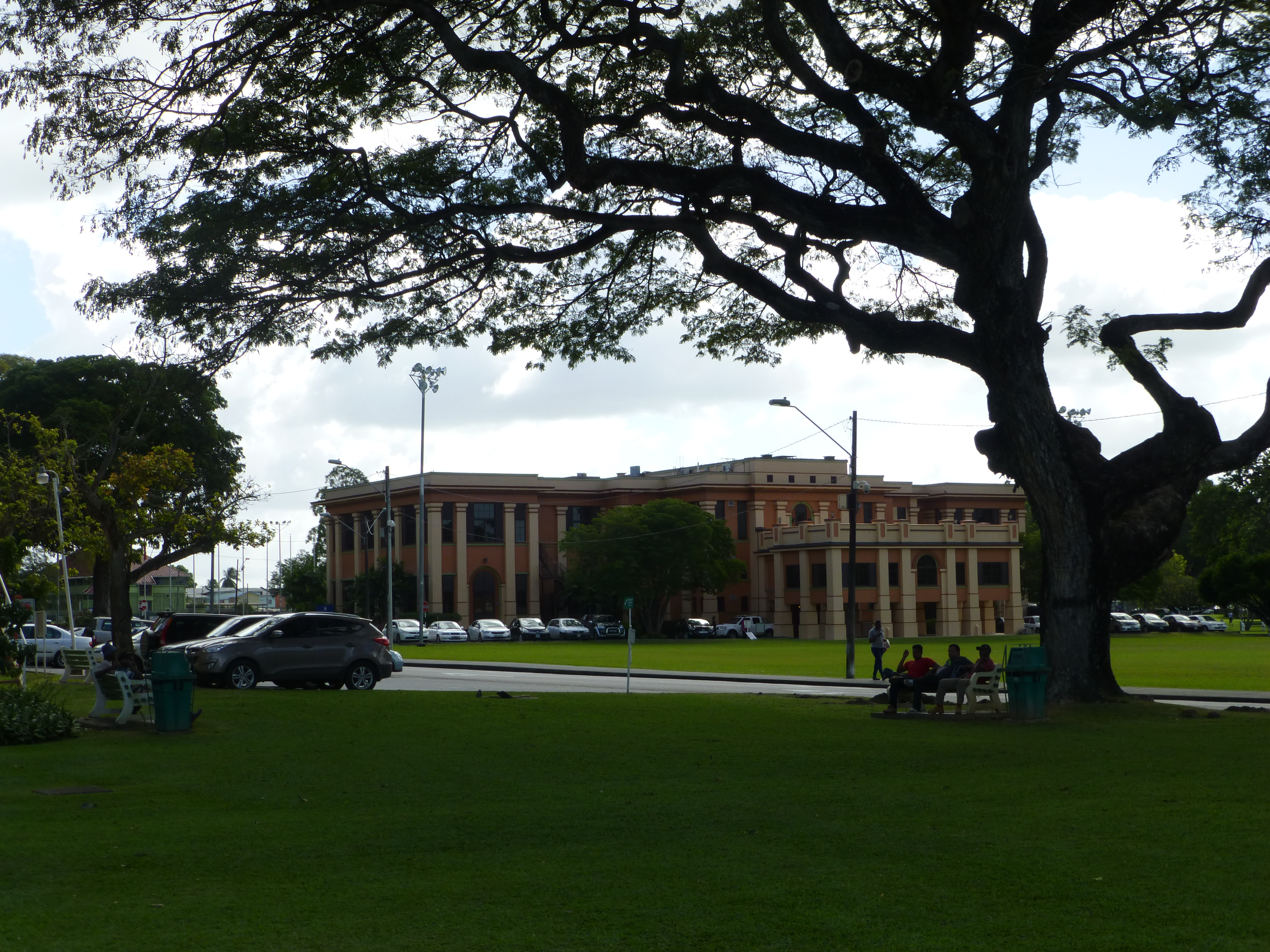
University of the West Indies, St. Augustine

Students attend secondary school for a minimum of five years, leading to the CSEC (Caribbean Secondary Education Certificate) examinations, which is the equivalent of the British GCSE O levels. Children with satisfactory grades may opt to continue high school for a further two-year period, leading to the Caribbean Advanced Proficiency Examinations (CAPE), the equivalent of GCE A levels. Both CSEC and CAPE examinations are held by the Caribbean Examinations Council (CXC). Public Primary and Secondary education is free for all, although private and religious schooling is available for a fee.

Tertiary education for tuition costs are provided for via GATE (The Government Assistance for Tuition Expenses), up to the level of the bachelor's degree, at the University of the West Indies (UWI), the University of Trinidad and Tobago (UTT), the University of the Southern Caribbean (USC), the College of Science, Technology and Applied Arts of Trinidad and Tobago (COSTAATT) and certain other local accredited institutions. Government also currently subsidises some Masters programmes. Both the Government and the private sector also provide financial assistance in the form of academic scholarships to gifted or needy students for study at local, regional or international universities. Trinidad and Tobago was ranked 114th in the Global Innovation Index in 2025, down from 91st in 2019.

=== Women ===
While women account for only 49% of the population, they constitute nearly 55% of the workforce in the country.

== Culture ==
Trinidad and Tobago has a diverse culture with African, Indian, Creole, European, Chinese, Indigenous, Latin American, and Arab influences, reflecting the various communities who have migrated to the islands over the centuries.

Steelpan music, the limbo dance competition, and carnival with its elaborate costumes, and Caribbean street foods are some of the famous cultures of the islands.

=== Festivals and holidays ===
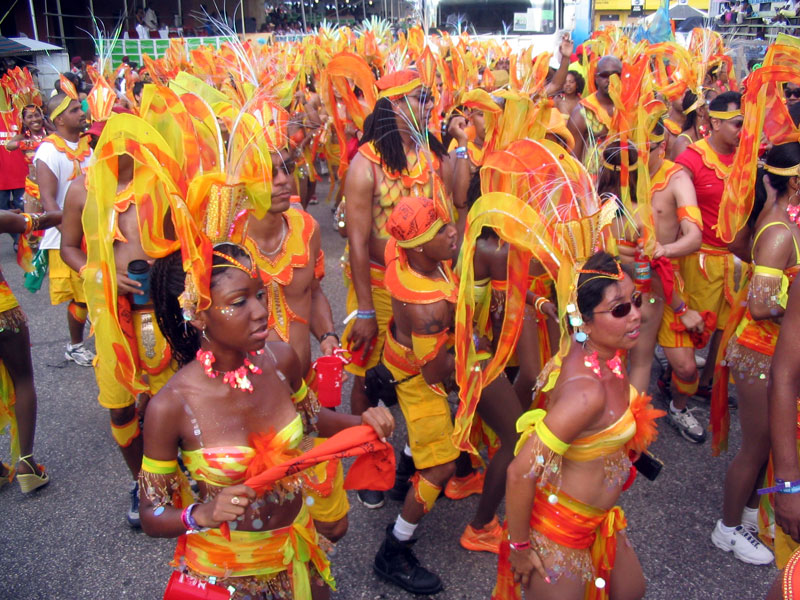
Masqueraders parading during Carnival

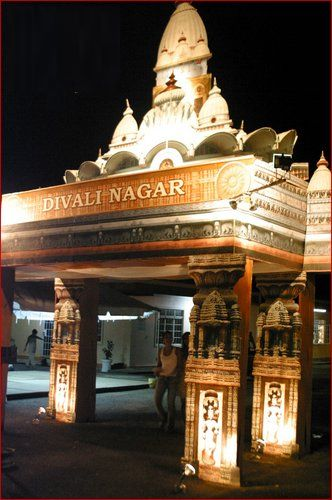
Divali Nagar entrance in Chaguanas; Divali Nagar is one of the largest Diwali celebration outside India

The island is particularly renowned for its annual Carnival celebrations. Festivals rooted in various religions and cultures practiced on the islands are also popular. Hindu festivals include Diwali, Phagwah (Holi), Nauratri, Vijayadashami, Maha Shivratri, Krishna Janmashtami, Ram Naumi, Hanuman Jayanti, Ganesh Utsav, Saraswati Jayanti, Kartik Nahan, Makar Sankranti, Pitru Paksha, Raksha Bandhan, Mesha Sankranti, Guru Purnima, Tulasi Vivaha, Vivaha Panchami, Kalbhairo Jayanti, Datta Jayanti, and Gita Jayanti. Christian holidays and observances include Spiritual Baptist/Shouter Liberation Day, Lent, Palm Sunday, Easter, Maundy Thursday, Good Friday, Ash Wednesday, Holy Week, Easter Monday, Octave of Easter, Pentecost, Whit Monday, Old Year's Day, New Year's Day, Christmas, Boxing Day, Epiphany, Assumption of Mary, Feast of Corpus Christi, All Souls' Day, All Saints' Day. Muslim holidays include Hosay (Ashura), Eid al-Fitr, Eid al-Adha, Day of Arafah, Mawlid, Ramadan, Chaand Raat, and Shab-e-barat. People of Indian descent celebrate Indian Arrival Day to commemorate the arrival of their indentured Indian ancestors beginning in 1845 and people of African descent celebrate Emancipation Day to commemorate the day their African ancestors were emancipated from slavery. Trinidad and Tobago was the first country in the world to recognise both of these holiday and make them public holidays. The Indigenous Amerindians have their Santa Rosa Indigenous Festival and the Chinese Trinidadians and Tobagonians have the Chinese New Year and Chinese Arrival Day, although they are not public national holidays. National holidays such as Independence Day, Republic Day and Labour Day are celebrated as well.

=== Art and design ===
Trinidadian designer Peter Minshall is renowned not only for his Carnival costumes but also for his role in opening ceremonies of the Barcelona Olympics, the 1994 FIFA World Cup, the 1996 Summer Olympics, and the 2002 Winter Olympics, for which he won an Emmy Award.

=== Museums and gardens ===
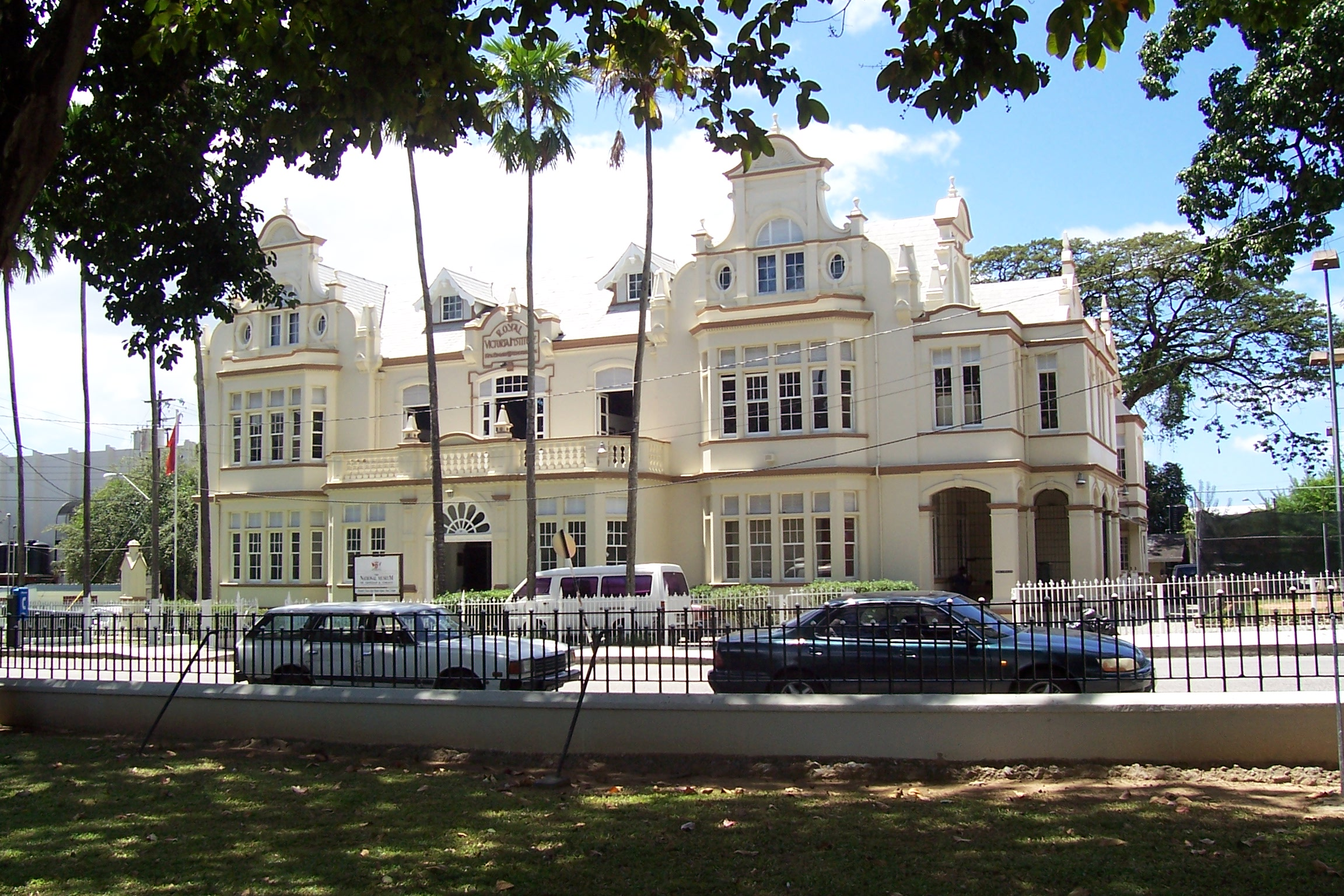
National Museum and Art Gallery

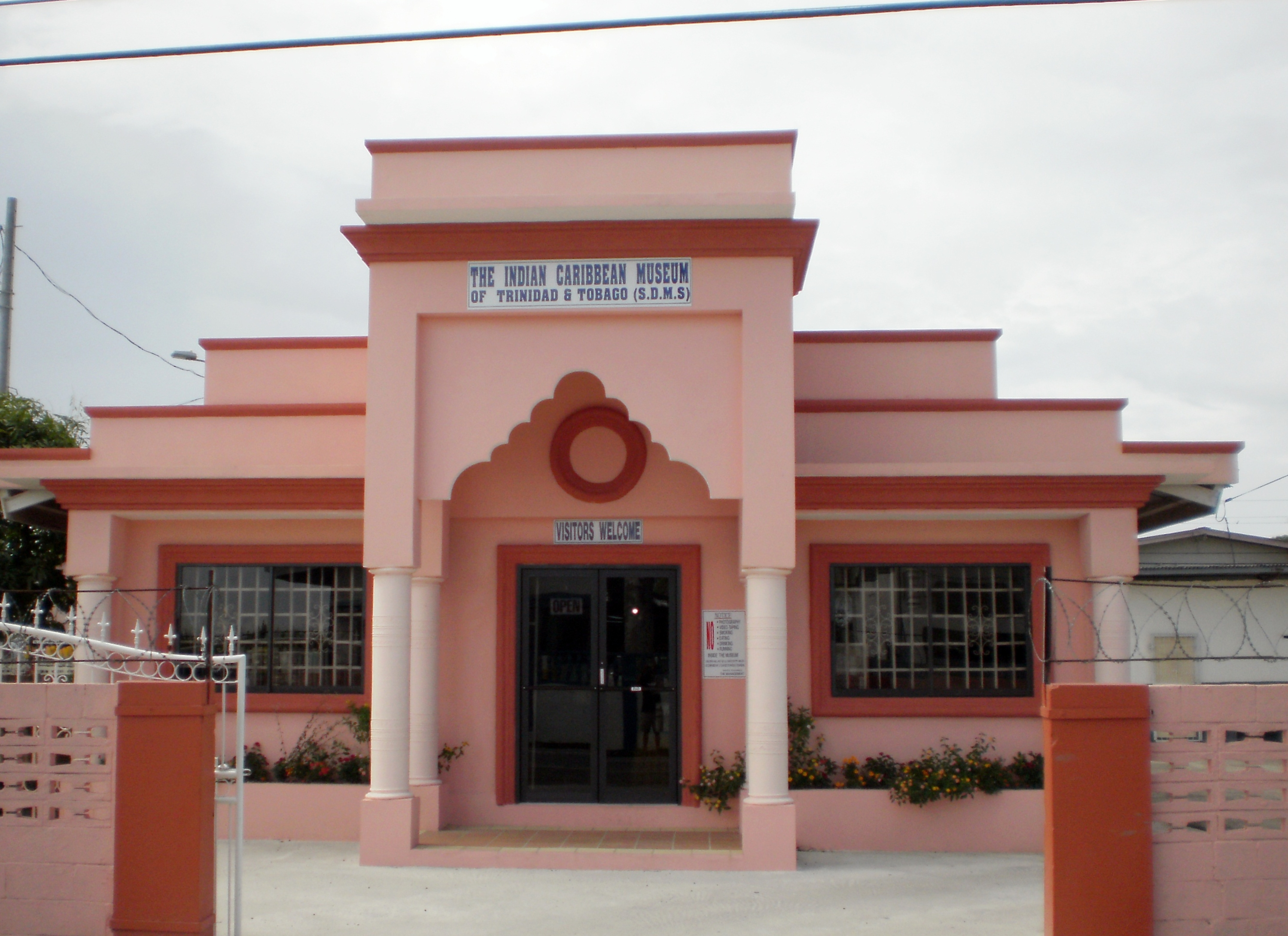
Indian Caribbean Museum

Trinidad and Tobago has a variety of museums, covering everything from classic cars, art, history, to zoology.

=== Literature ===
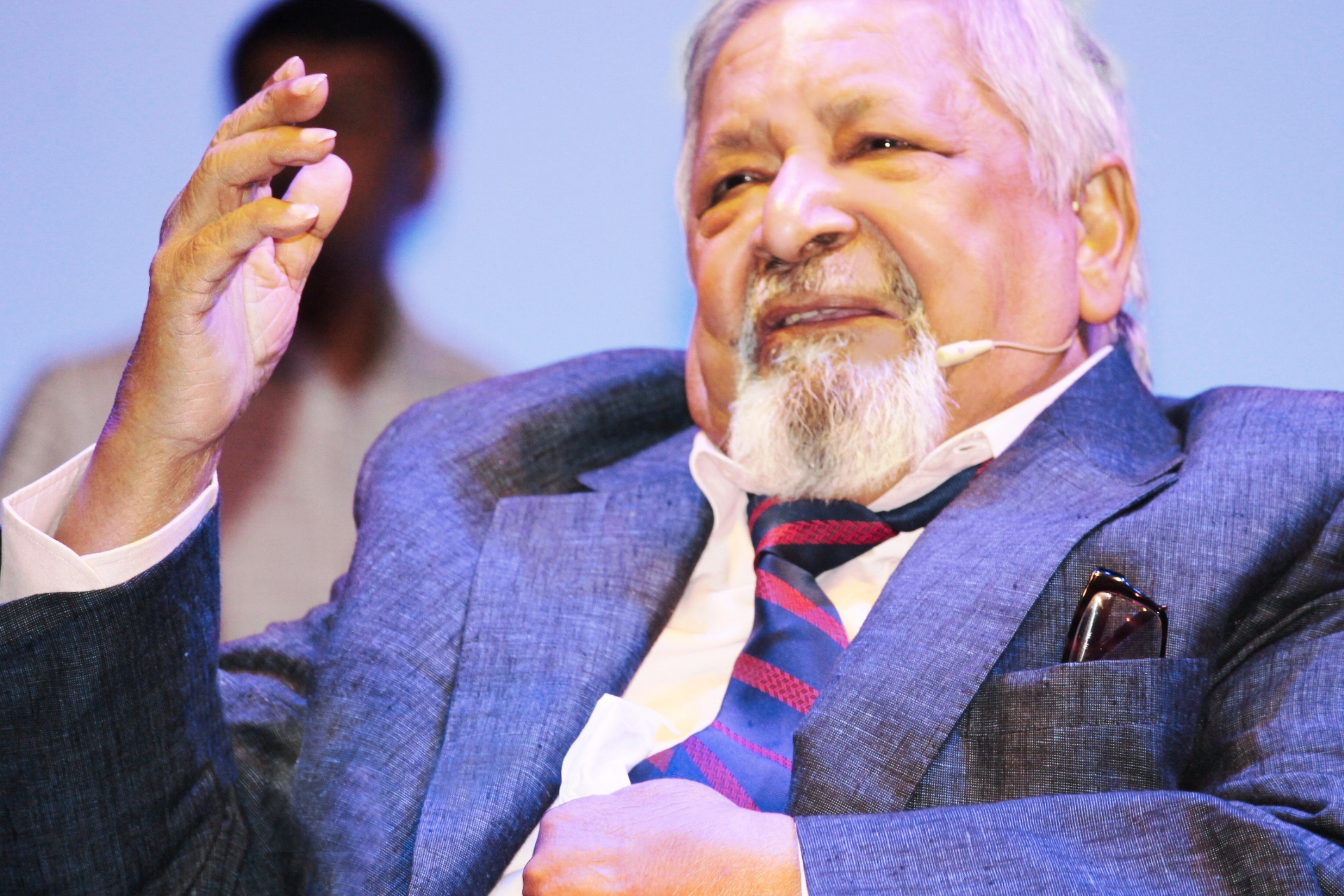
V. S. Naipaul in 2016

Trinidad and Tobago claims two Nobel Prize-winning authors, V. S. Naipaul and St Lucian-born Derek Walcott (who also founded the Trinidad Theatre Workshop). Other notable writers include Michael Anthony, Neil Bissoondath, Vahni Capildeo, Merle Hodge, C. L. R. James, Earl Lovelace, Rabindranath Maharaj, Shani Mootoo, Savi Naipaul Akal, Seepersad Naipaul, Shiva Naipaul, Lakshmi Persaud, Kenneth Ramchand, and Samuel Selvon.

=== Music ===
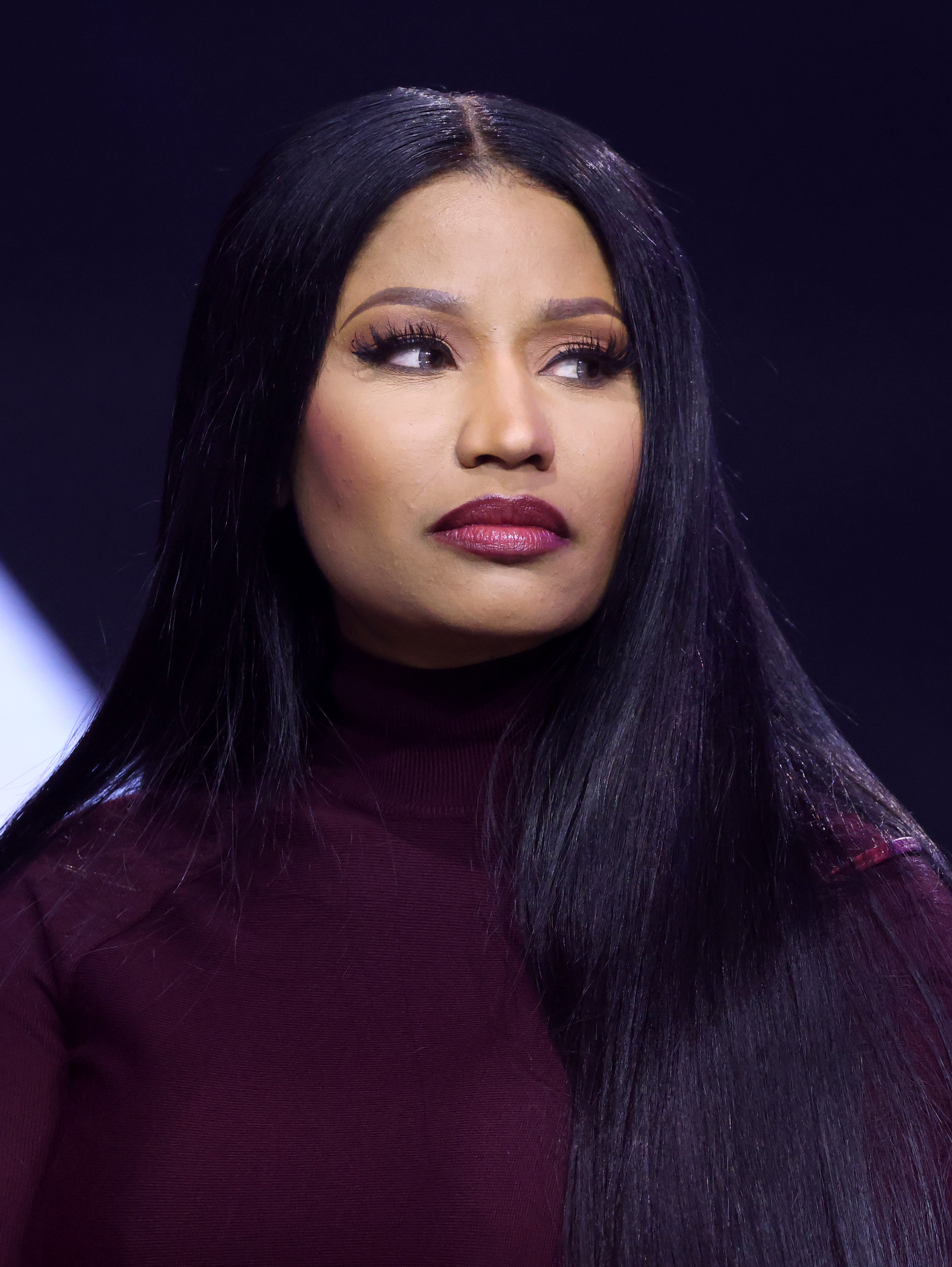
Nicki Minaj

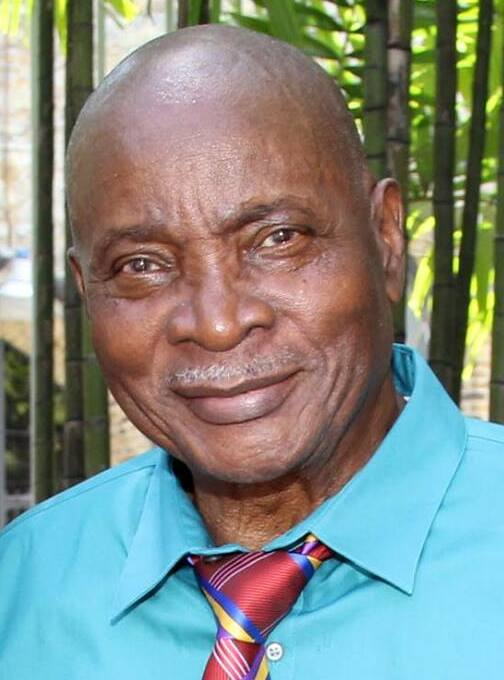
Mighty Sparrow

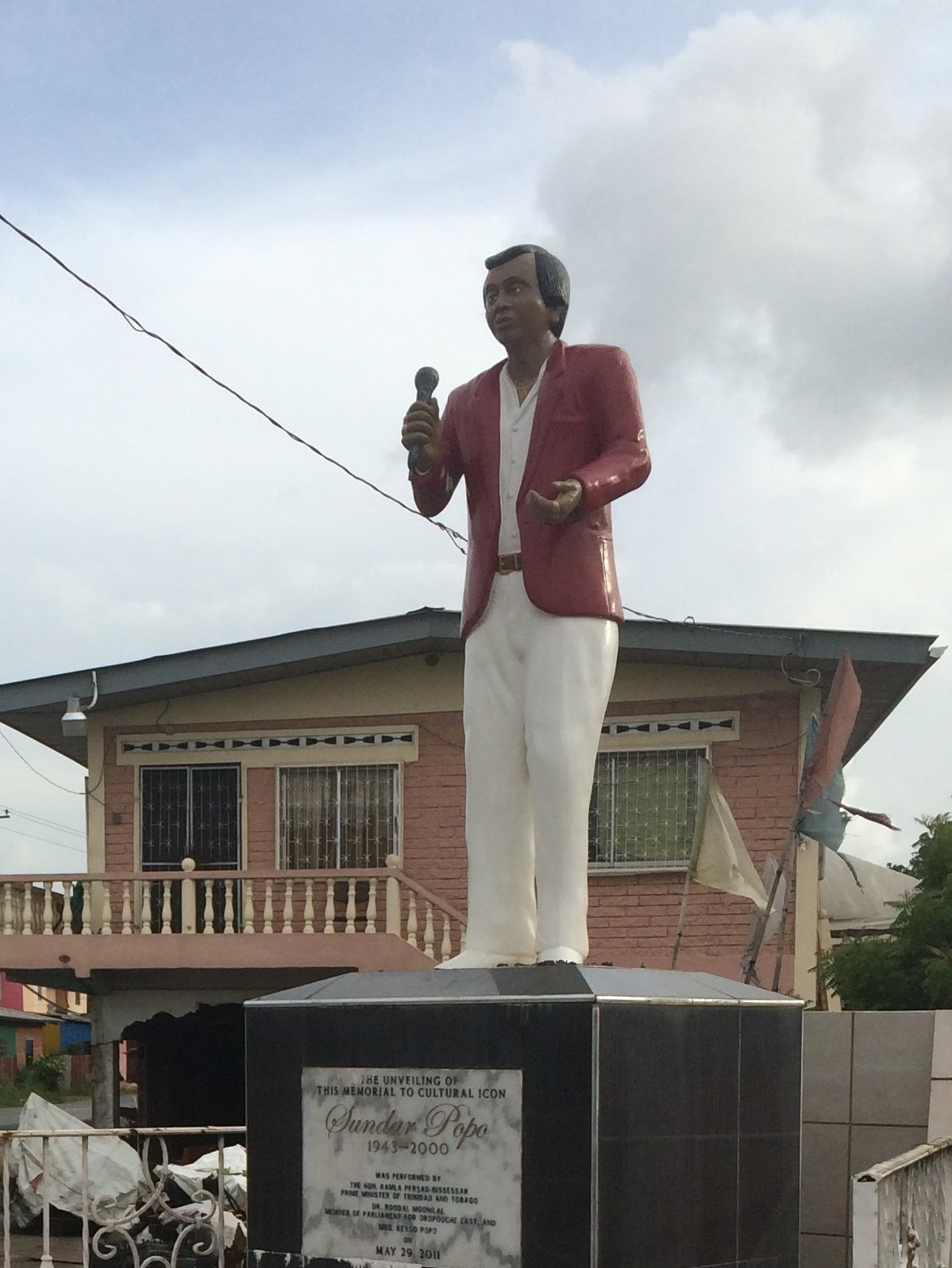
Sundar Popo

Calypso Rose

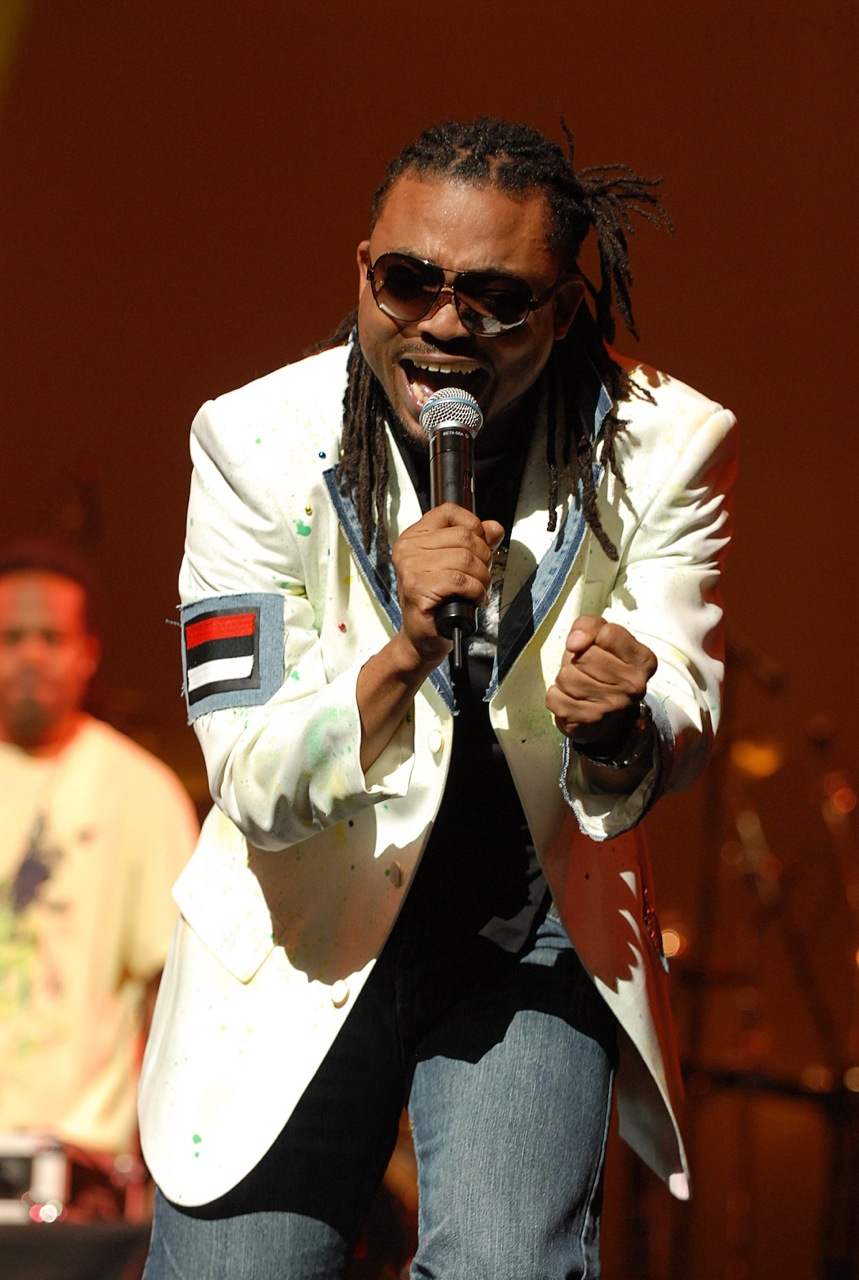
Machel Montano

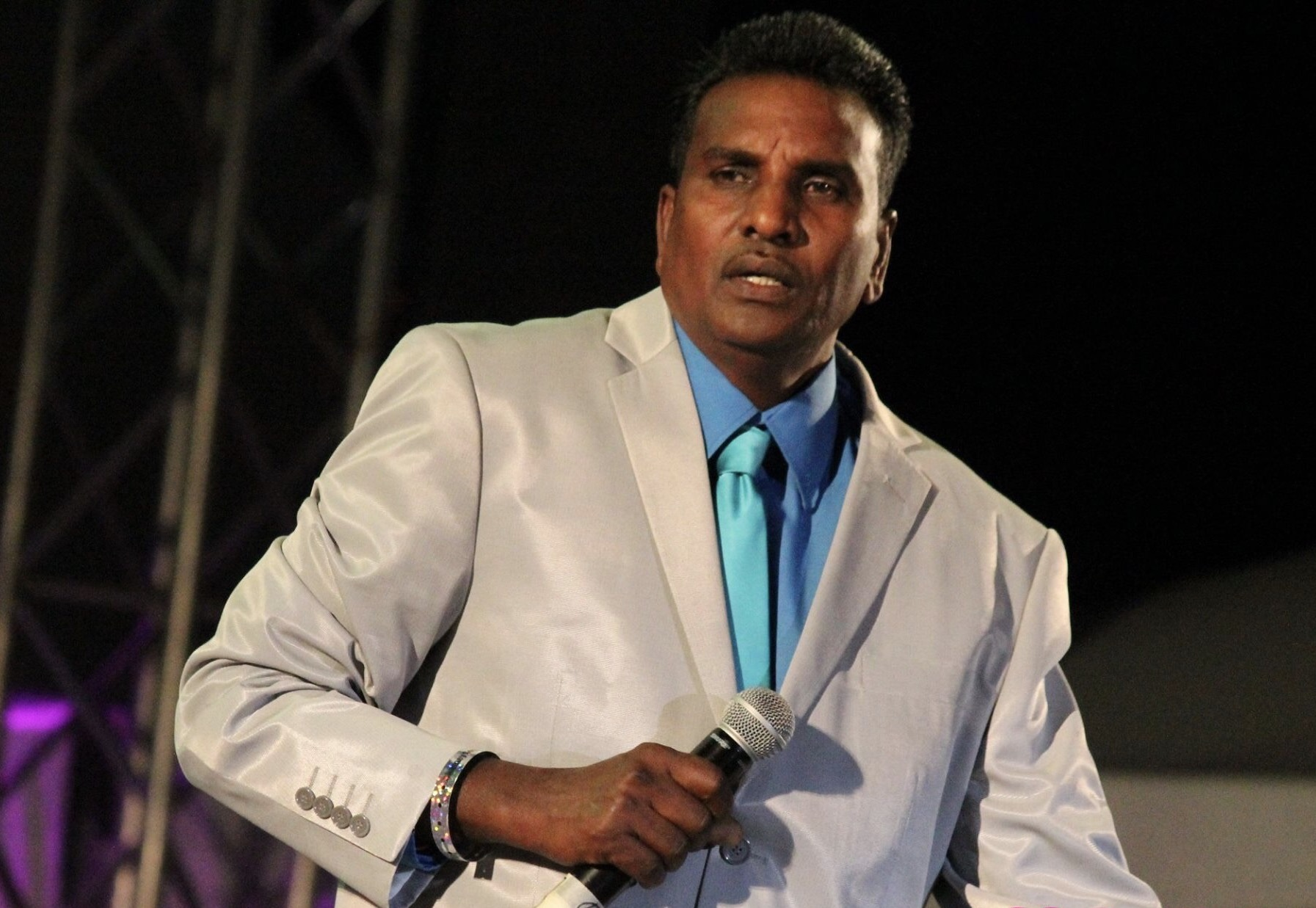
Rakesh Yankaran

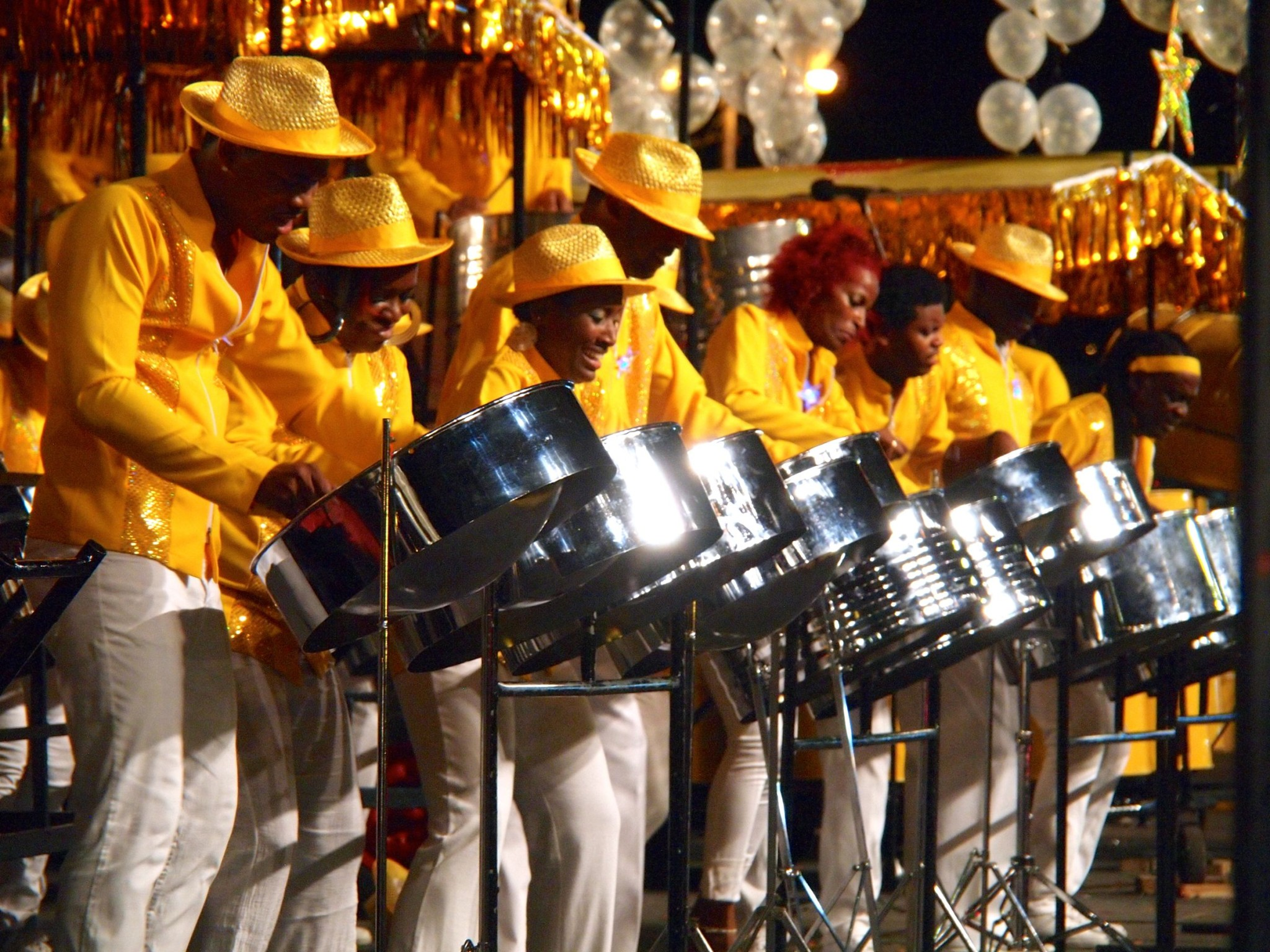
Steelpan band, invented in Trinidad and Tobago and is the national instrument.

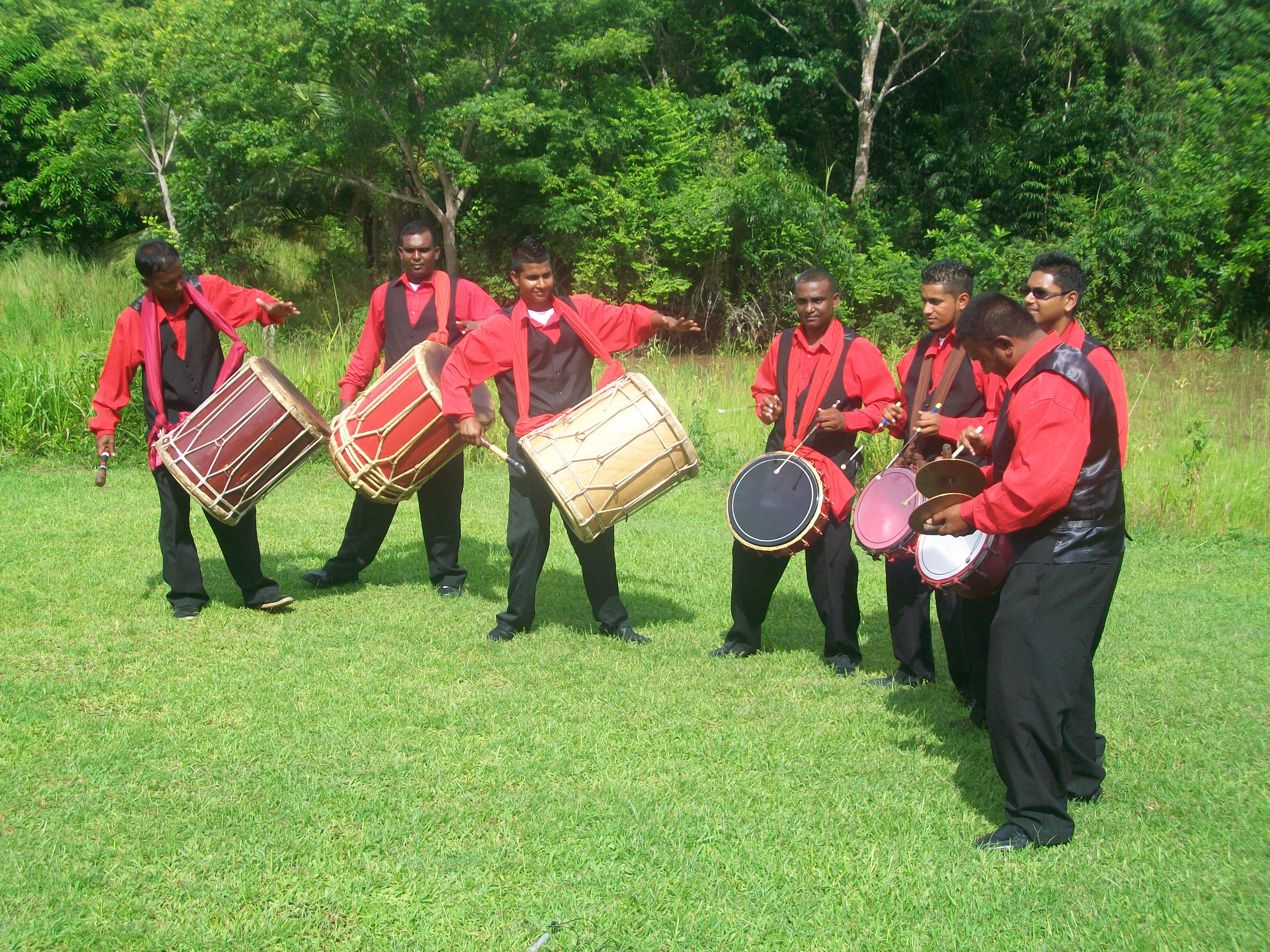
Tassa is a percussion ensemble of Indian origin that is popular in Trinidad and Tobago.

Trinidad and Tobago is the birthplace of calypso music and the steelpan. Trinidad is also the birthplace of soca music, chutney music, chutney-soca, parang, rapso, pichakaree and chutney parang.

=== Dance ===
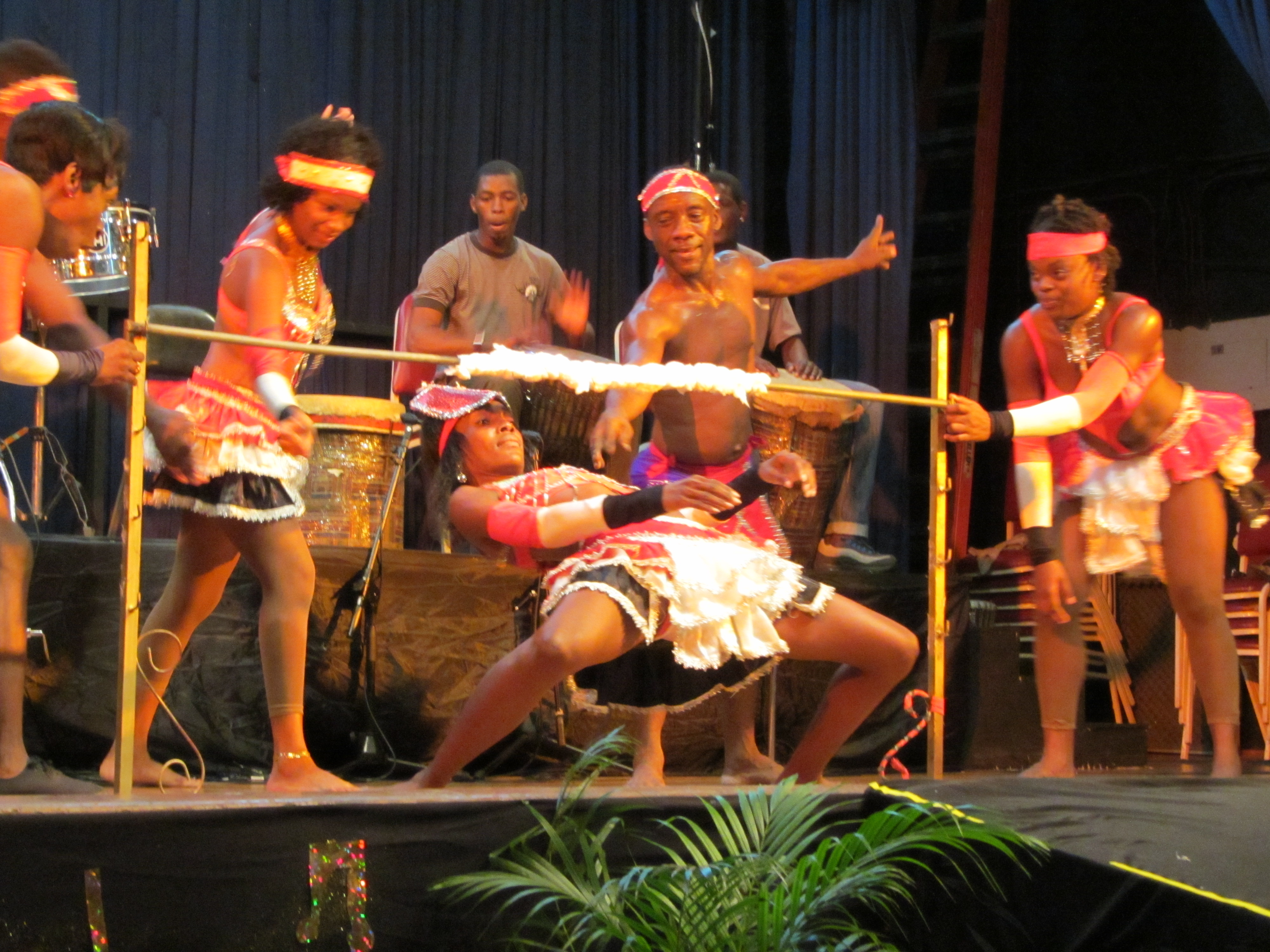
Limbo dance in Port of Spain

The limbo dance originated in Trinidad as an event that took place at wakes in Trinidad. The limbo has African roots. It was popularised in the 1950s by dance pioneer Julia Edwards (known as the "First Lady of Limbo") and her company which appeared in several films. Bélé, Bongo, and wining are also dance forms with African roots.

Jazz, ballroom, ballet, modern, and salsa dancing are also popular.

Indian dance forms are also prevalent in Trinidad and Tobago. Kathak, Odissi, and Bharatanatyam are the most popular Indian classical dance forms in Trinidad and Tobago. Indian folk dances, such as launda ke naach, as well as Bollywood dances and chutney dancing are also popular.

=== Media and theatre ===
Geoffrey Holder (brother of Boscoe Holder) and Heather Headley are two Trinidad-born artists who have won Tony Awards for theatre. Holder also has a distinguished film career, and Headley has won a Grammy Award as well.

Indian theatre is also popular throughout Trinidad and Tobago. Nautankis and dramas such as Raja Harishchandra, Raja Nal, Raja Rasalu, Sarwaneer (Sharwan Kumar), Indra Sabha, Bhakt Prahalad, Lorikayan, Gopichand, and Alha-Khand were brought by Indians to Trinidad and Tobago, however they had largely began to die out, till preservation began by Indian cultural groups. Ramleela, the drama about the life of the Hindu deity Rama, is popular during the time of Sharad Navaratri and Vijaydashmi before Diwali, and Krishnaleela (Rasleela), the drama about the life of the Hindu deity Krishna, is popular around the time of Krishna Janmashtami.

Trinidad and Tobago is also the smallest country to have two Miss Universe titleholders and had the first black woman ever to win: Janelle Commissiong in 1977, followed by Wendy Fitzwilliam in 1998; the country has also had one Miss World titleholder, Giselle LaRonde who won in 1986.

=== Cuisine ===
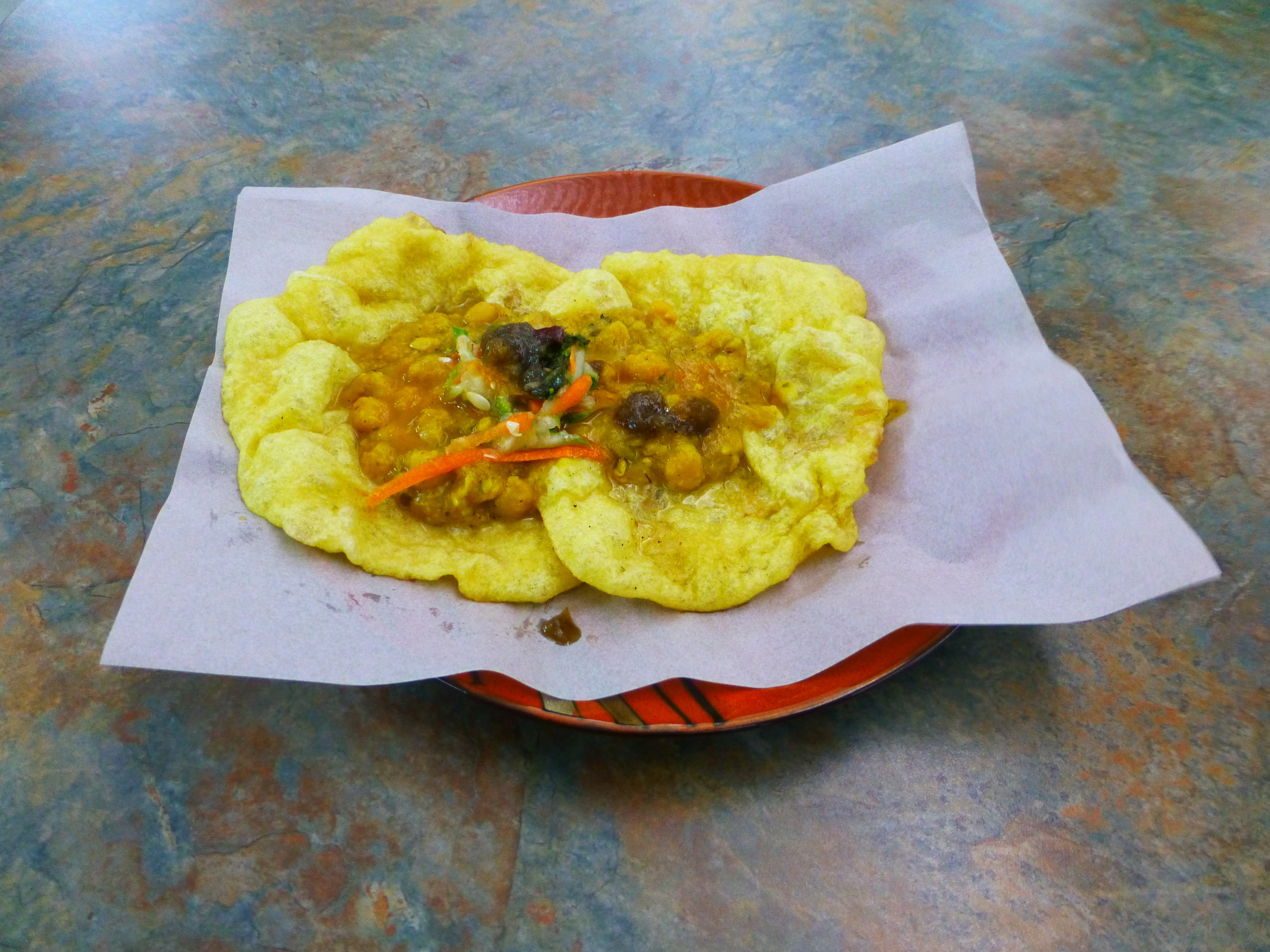
Doubles

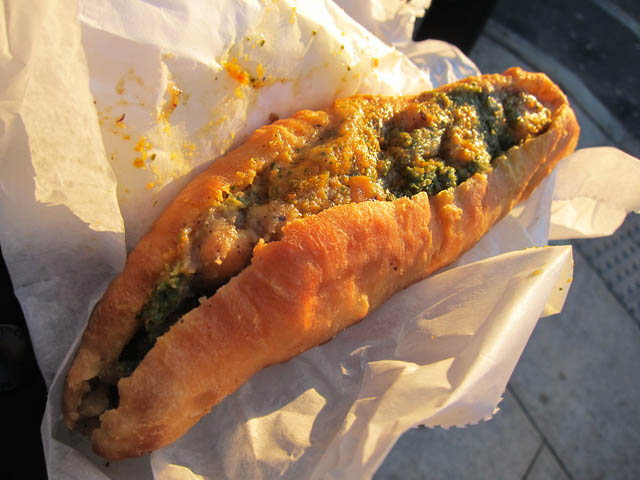
Aloo pie

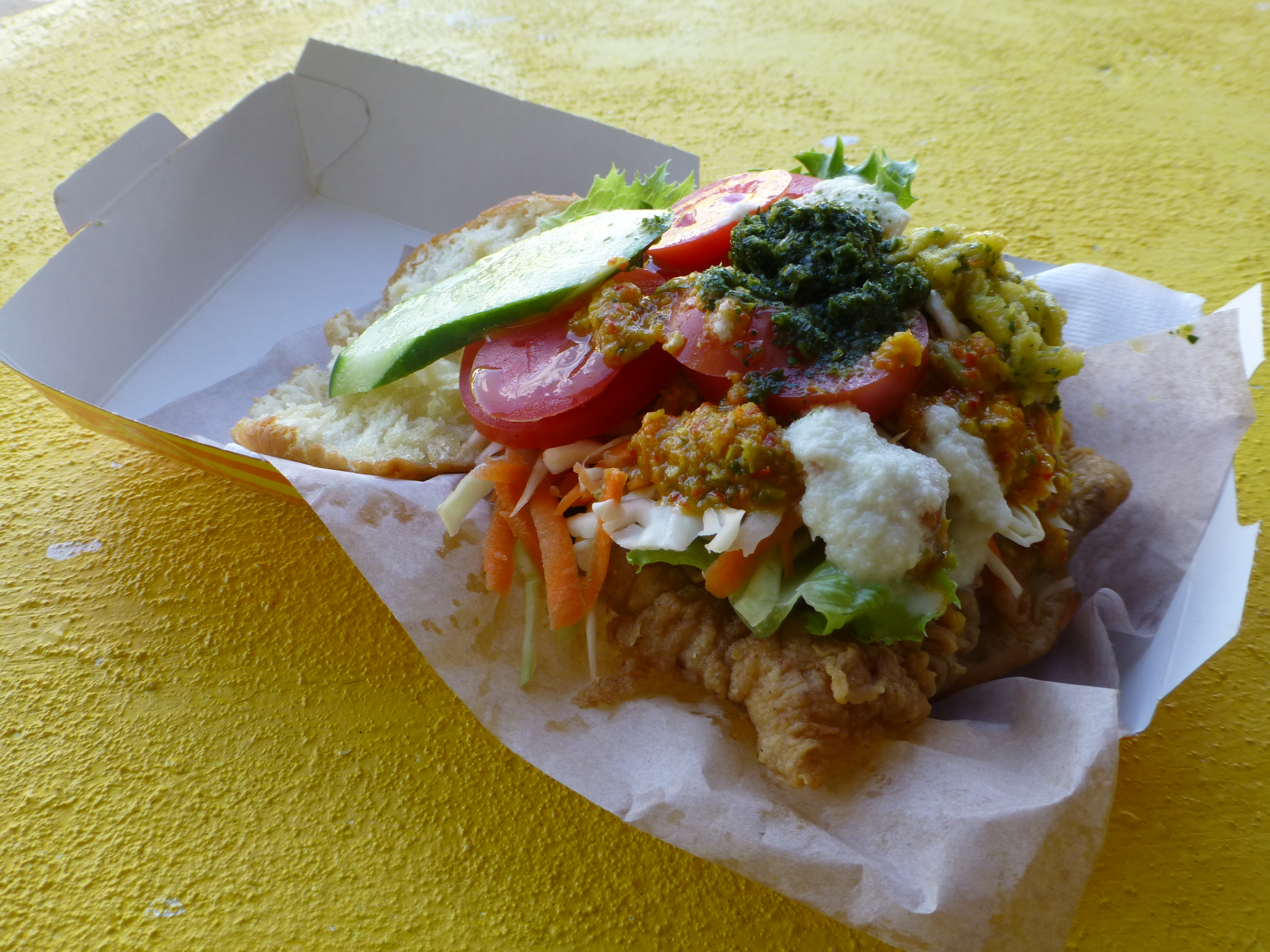
Bake and shark

Diversity is also reflected the culinary culture, which bears witness to a variety of influences, including African, Indian, Chinese, Creole, European, Amerindian, Latin American, Levantine, and North American. Street food is popular, and some examples are doubles, aloo pie, wrap roti, saheena, phoulourie, kachorie, bara, baiganee, pies, accra, bake and shark, barbecue, souse, chow, black pudding, pow, wontons, arepas, shawarma, gyro, and others. Some main and/or side dishes are curry crab and dumpling, pelau, oil down, pastelles, buljol, cou-cou, callaloo, ground provisions, fried plantain, red beans and rice, fried chicken, stewed chicken, stewed fish, stewed shrimp, stewed pork, barbecue chicken, barbecue pork, fried fish, roast fish, bhajee rice, potato salad, macaroni pie, coconut bake, fry bake, dhal bhaat (dhal and rice), gilaa bhaat, kurhee, dhalpuri, paratha, sada roti, dosti roti, curry chicken, curry goat, geera pork, curry fish, curry shrimp, curry channa and aloo, curry baigan, bhajee, aloo tarkari, mango tarkari, curry chataigne, curry bodi (yardlong bean), curry seim (lablab beab), kohra (pumpkin) tarkari, baigan chokha, damadol (tomatoes) chokha, aloo choka, kitchrie, tarkaris, pepper shrimp, fried rice, chow mein, lo mein, Chinese chicken, Peking duck, char siu pork, and many others. Some noted soups are chicken, cow heel, fish broth, and corn soup. Some desserts and sweets include cassava pone, sweet bread, coconut drops, currants roll, sponge cake, black cake, kurma, gulab jamun, jalebi, laddoo, halwa, mohanbhog (parsad), pera, gujiya, maleeda, sohari, laapsi, sweet rice (kheer), barfi, rasgulla, roat, panjiri, batasa, paynouse, sawine, sugar cake, toolum, and coconut, mango, or soursop ice cream.

Of these one of the most famous is doubles, which is two bara (fried flatbread) with channa (curried chickpeas) with various condiments like chutneys, kuchela, and pepper sauce. This is the most popular street food in the country. Doubles are popular late-night snack or breakfast, are thought to have been invented in 1936 on Trinidad.

Types of food that are popular are street food, celebration foods, deserts, and condiments like various chutneys. Fresh coconut water, rum, Mauby, are some examples. Having a fresh coconut water with "jelly", bitters, various mixed drinks, sorrel, are among noted beverages of the islands. Trinidadian gyros and shawarma are other noted food item, which was popularised by Lebanese and Syrian migrants to the islands.

=== Sports ===
==== Olympic sports ====
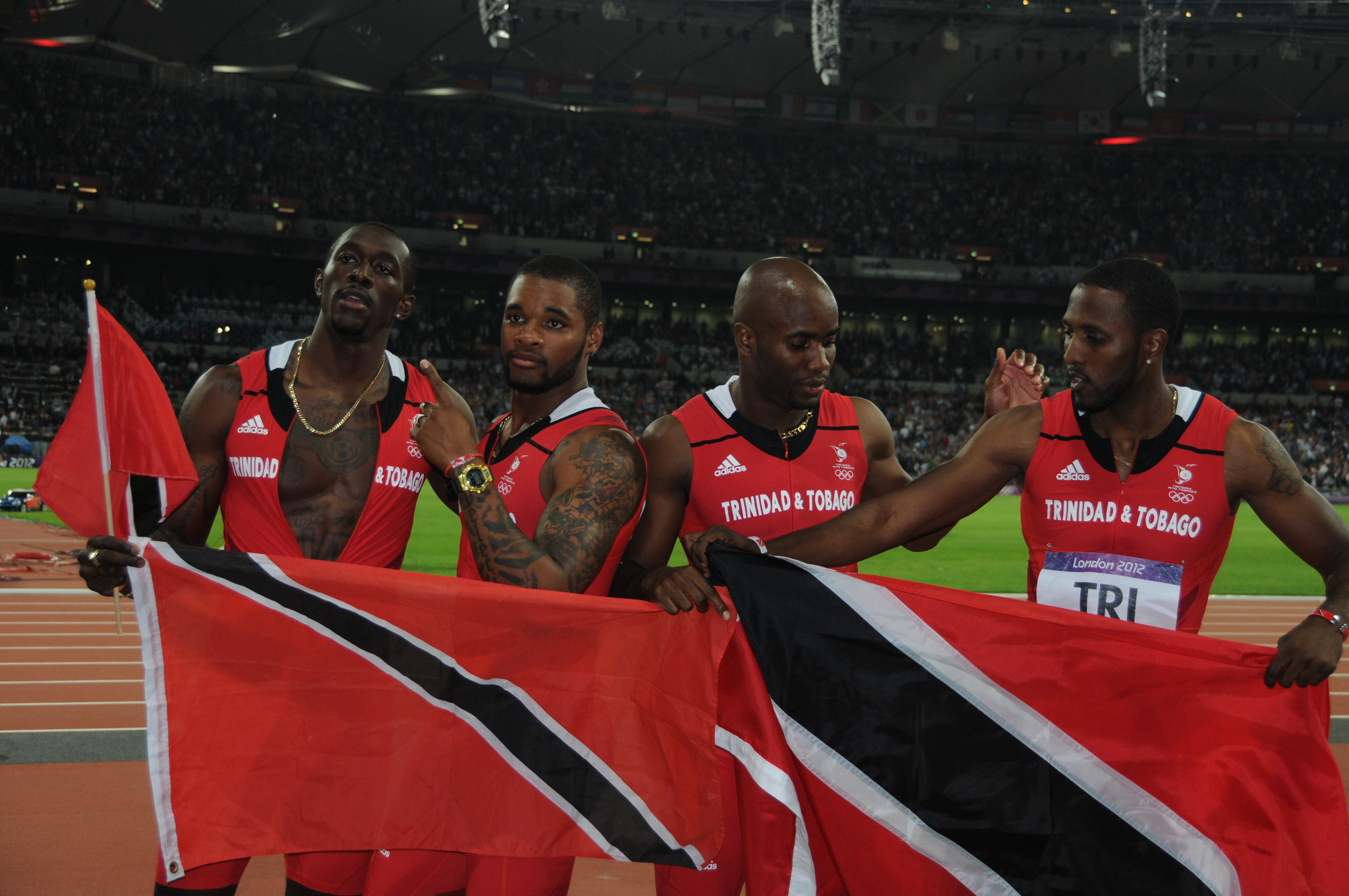
Trinidad and Tobago won bronze in the Men's 4x400 relay at the 2012 London Olympics.

Hasely Crawford won the first Olympic gold medal for Trinidad and Tobago in the men's 100-metre dash in the 1976 Summer Olympics. Nine different athletes from Trinidad and Tobago have won twelve medals at the Olympics, beginning with a silver medal in weightlifting, won by Rodney Wilkes in 1948. Most recently, a gold medal was won by Keshorn Walcott in the men's javelin throw in 2012. Ato Boldon has won the most Olympic and World Championship medals for Trinidad and Tobago in athletics, with eight in total – four from the Olympics and four from the World Championships. Boldon won the 1997 200-metre dash World Championship in Athens, and was the sole world champion Trinidad and Tobago had produced until Jehue Gordon in Moscow 2013. Swimmer George Bovell III won a bronze medal in the men's 200 metres Individual Medley in 2004. At the 2017 World Championship in London, the Men's 4x400 relay team captured the title, thus the country now celebrates three world championships titles. The team consisted of Jarrin Solomon, Jareem Richards, Machel Cedenio and Lalonde Gordon with Renny Quow who ran in the heats.

In 2018, The Court of Arbitration for Sport made its final decision on the failed doping sample from the Jamaican team in the 4 x 100 relay in the 2008 Olympic Games. The team from Trinidad and Tobago will be awarded the gold medal, because of the second rank during the relay run.

In 2023, Trinidad and Tobago hosted the 2023 Commonwealth Youth Games.

In 2024, Trinidadian sprinter Leah Bertrand competed in the 2024 Paris Olympics for the first time. Overall, TT sent about 17 athletes to the 2024 games, including noted athletes Michelle-Lee Ahye (springer), Jereem Richards (200m and 400m), Dylan Carter (swimming), Keshorn Walcott (javelin), Nicholas Paul (cyclist). Keshorn Walcott is previous Olympic medal winner, have won Gold and bronze.

(see also Trinidad and Tobago at the 2024 Summer Olympics)

==== Cricket ====
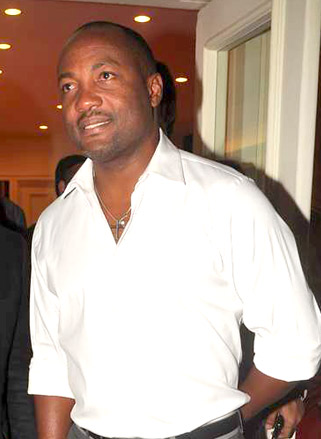
Brian Lara, widely renowned as one of the greatest batsmen of all time

Cricket is often deemed the national sport of Trinidad and Tobago, and there is intense inter-island rivalry with its Caribbean neighbours. Trinidad and Tobago is represented at Test cricket, One Day International as well as Twenty20 cricket level as a member of the West Indies team. The national team plays at the first-class level in regional competitions such as the Regional Four Day Competition and Regional Super50. Meanwhile, the Trinbago Knight Riders play in the Caribbean Premier League.

The Queen's Park Oval located in Port of Spain is the largest cricket ground in the West Indies, having hosted 60 Test matches as of January 2018. Trinidad and Tobago along with other islands from the Caribbean co-hosted the 2007 Cricket World Cup.

==== Football ====
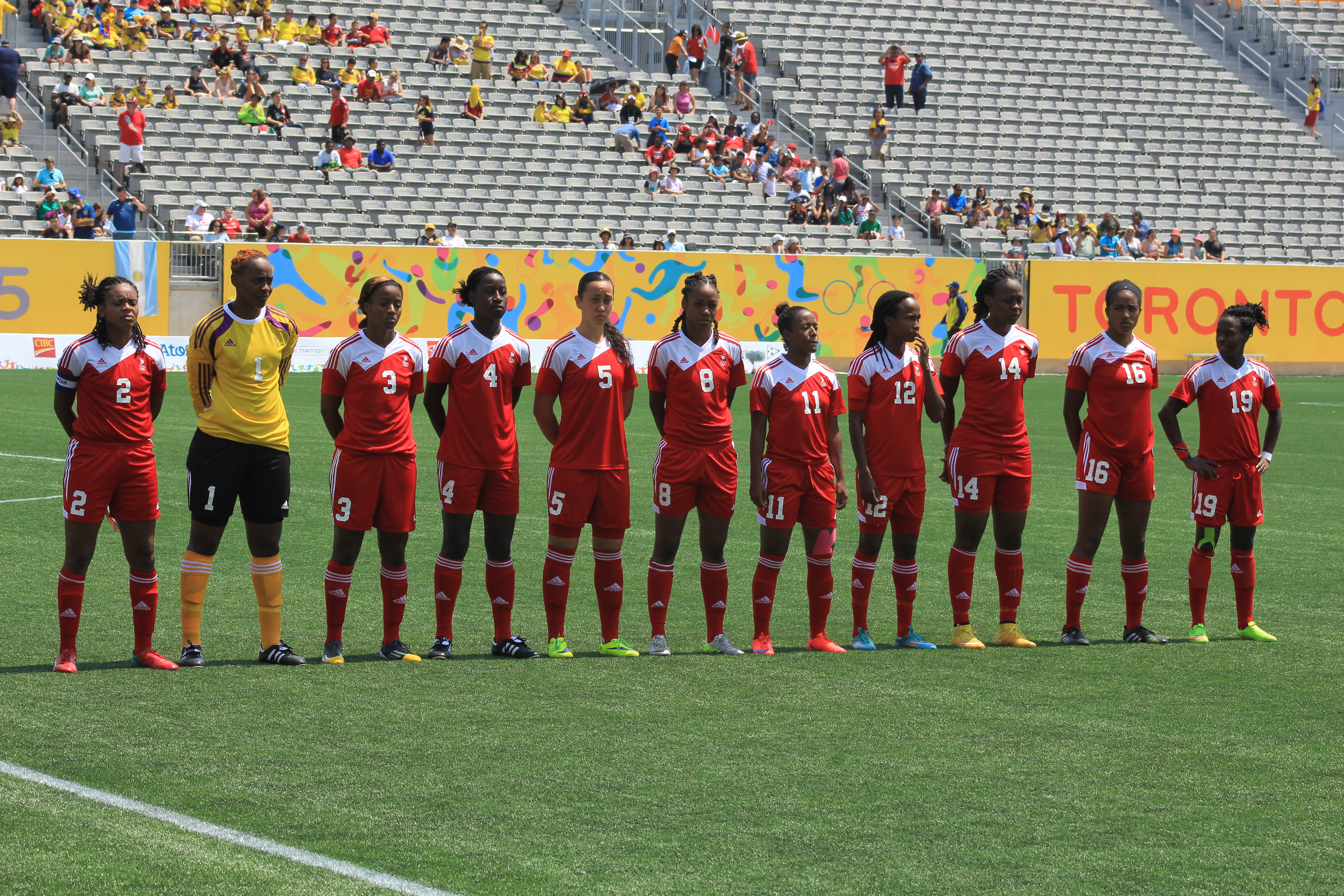
Woman's team at the 2015 Pan American Games

Association football is also a popular sport in Trinidad and Tobago. The men's national football team qualified for the 2006 FIFA World Cup for the first time by beating Bahrain in Manama on 16 November 2005, making them the second least populated country ever to qualify, after Iceland.

The team, coached by Dutchman Leo Beenhakker, and led by Tobagonian-born captain Dwight Yorke, drew their first group game – against Sweden in Dortmund, 0–0, but lost the second game to England on late goals, 0–2. They were eliminated after losing 2–0 to Paraguay in the last game of the Group stage.

Prior to the 2006 World Cup qualification, Trinidad and Tobago came close in a controversial qualification campaign for the 1974 FIFA World Cup. Following the match, the referee of their critical game against Haiti was awarded a lifetime ban for his actions. Trinidad and Tobago again fell just short of qualifying for the World Cup in 1990, needing only a draw at home against the United States but losing 1–0.

They play their home matches at the Hasely Crawford Stadium. Trinidad and Tobago hosted the 2001 FIFA U-17 World Championship, and hosted the 2010 FIFA U-17 Women's World Cup.

The TT Pro League is the country's primary football competition and is the top level of the Trinidad and Tobago football league system. The Pro League serves as a league for professional football clubs in Trinidad and Tobago. The league began in 1999 as part of a need for a professional league to strengthen the country's national team and improve the development of domestic players. The first season took place in the same year beginning with eight teams.

==== Basketball ====
Basketball is commonly played in Trinidad and Tobago in colleges, universities and throughout various urban basketball courts. Its national team is one of the most successful teams in the Caribbean. At the Caribbean Basketball Championship it won four straight gold medals from 1986 to 1990.

==== Other sports ====
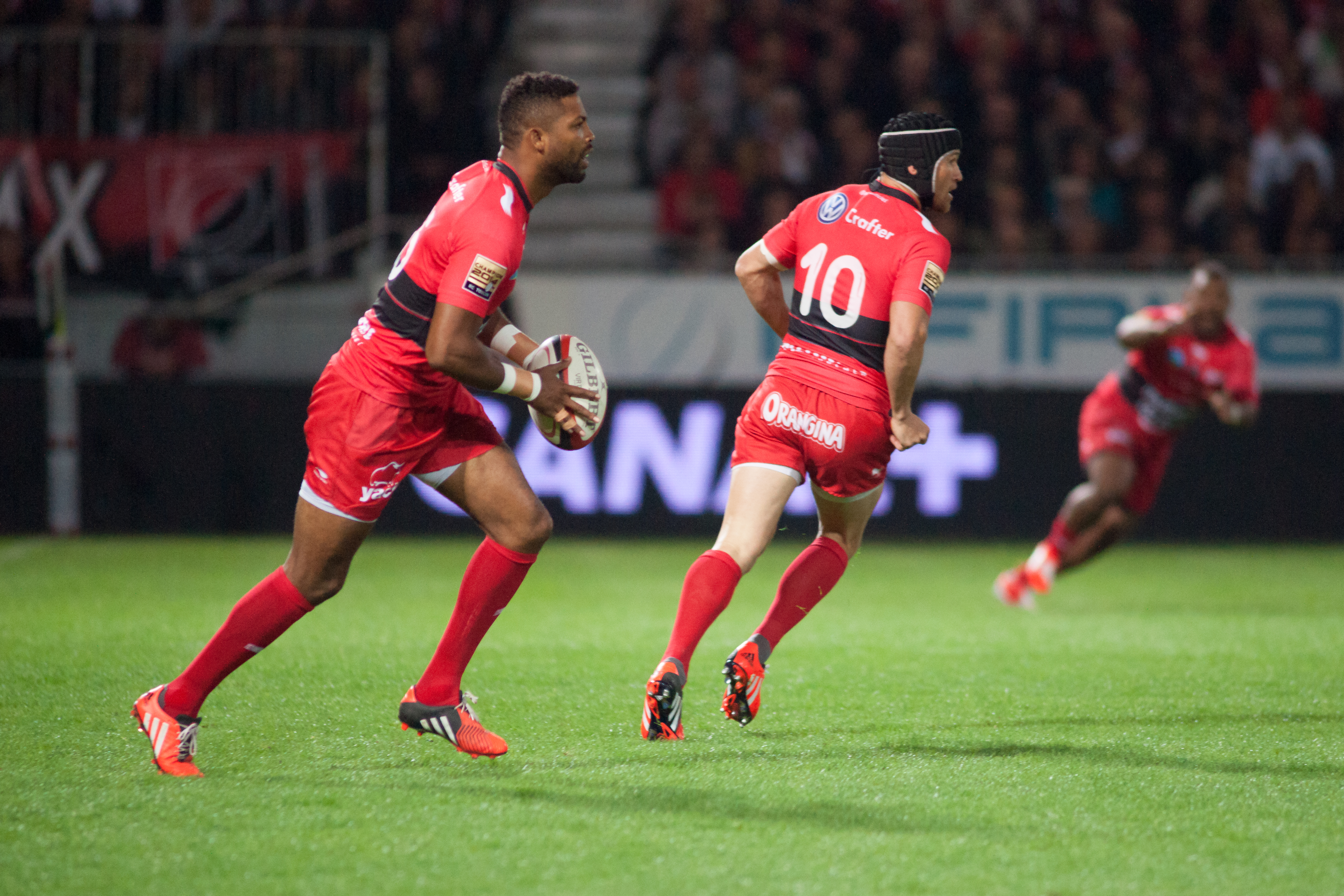
Trinidad rugby players of Rugby Club Toulonnais, 2014

Netball has long been a popular sport in Trinidad and Tobago, although it has declined in popularity in recent years. At the Netball World Championships they co-won the event in 1979, were runners up in 1987, and second runners up in 1983.

Rugby is played in Trinidad and Tobago and continues to be a popular sport, and horse racing is regularly followed in the country.

The Trinidad and Tobago national baseball team, controlled by the Baseball/Softball Association of Trinidad and Tobago, represents the nation in international competitions. The team is a provisional member of the Pan American Baseball Confederation.

There are a number of 9 and 18-hole golf courses on Trinidad and Tobago. The most established is the St Andrews Golf Club, Maraval in Trinidad (commonly referred to as Moka), and there is a newer course at Trincity, near Piarco Airport called Millennium Lakes. There are 18-hole courses at Chaguramas and Point-a-Pierre and nine-hole courses at Couva and St Madeline. Tobago has two 18-hole courses. The older of the two is at Mount Irvine, with the Magdalena Hotel & Golf Club (formerly Tobago Plantations) being built more recently.

Although a minor sport, bodybuilding is of growing interest in Trinidad and Tobago. Darrem Charles, a former world class body builder, is from Trinidad and Tobago.

Dragonboat is also another water-sport that has been rapidly growing over the years. Introduced in 2006. the fraternity made consistent strides in having more members a part of the TTDBF (Trinidad and Tobago Dragonboat Federation) as well as performing on an international level such as the 10th IDBF World Nations Dragon Boat Championships in Tampa, Florida in the US in 2011.

Claude Noel is a former world champion in professional boxing. He was born in Tobago.

The Trinidad and Tobago Chess Championship was started in 1937, and is an annual national chess championship.

== National symbols ==
=== Flag ===
The flag of Trinidad and Tobago

The flag was chosen by the Independence committee in 1962. Red, black and white symbolise the warmth of the people, the richness of the earth and water respectively.

=== Coat of arms ===
The coat of arms of Trinidad and Tobago

The coat of arms was designed by the Independence committee, and features the scarlet ibis (native to Trinidad), the cocrico (native to Tobago) and hummingbird. The shield bears the steelpan which is the National instrument of Trinidad and Tobago.

=== National anthem and national songs ===
The national anthem of the twin-island state is "Forged from the Love of Liberty".

Other national songs include "God Bless Our Nation" and "Our Nation's Dawning".

=== National flower ===
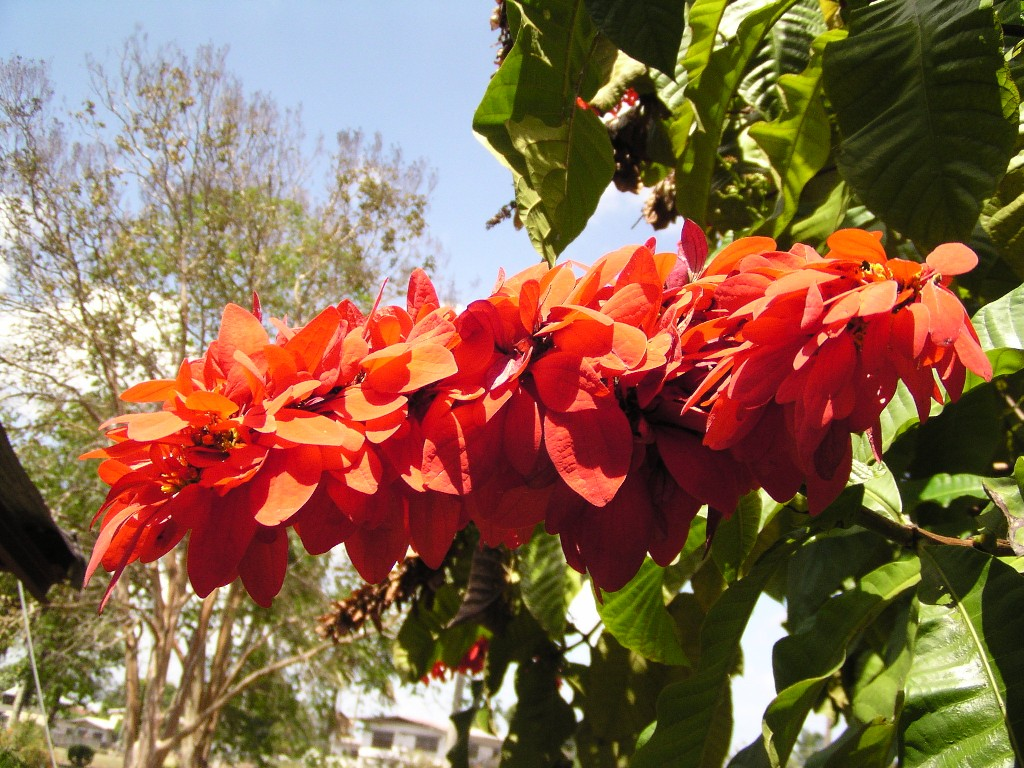
The chaconia (Warszewiczia coccinea) is the national flower of Trinidad and Tobago.

The national flower of Trinidad and Tobago is the chaconia flower. It was chosen as the national flower because it is an indigenous flower that has witnessed the history of Trinidad and Tobago. It was also chosen as the national flower because of its red colour that resembles the red of the national flag and coat of arms and because it blooms around the Independence Day of Trinidad and Tobago.

=== National birds ===
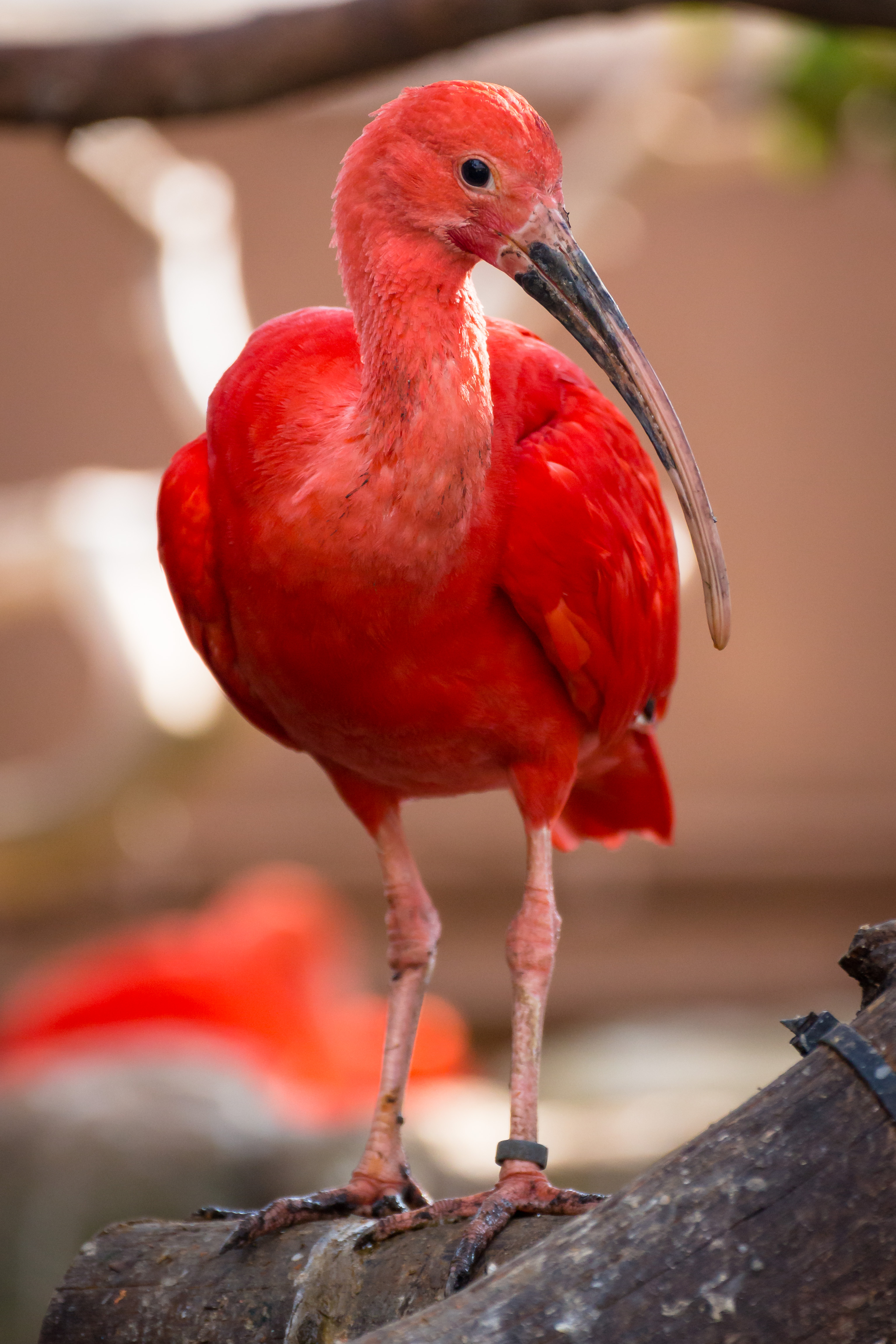
Scarlet ibis

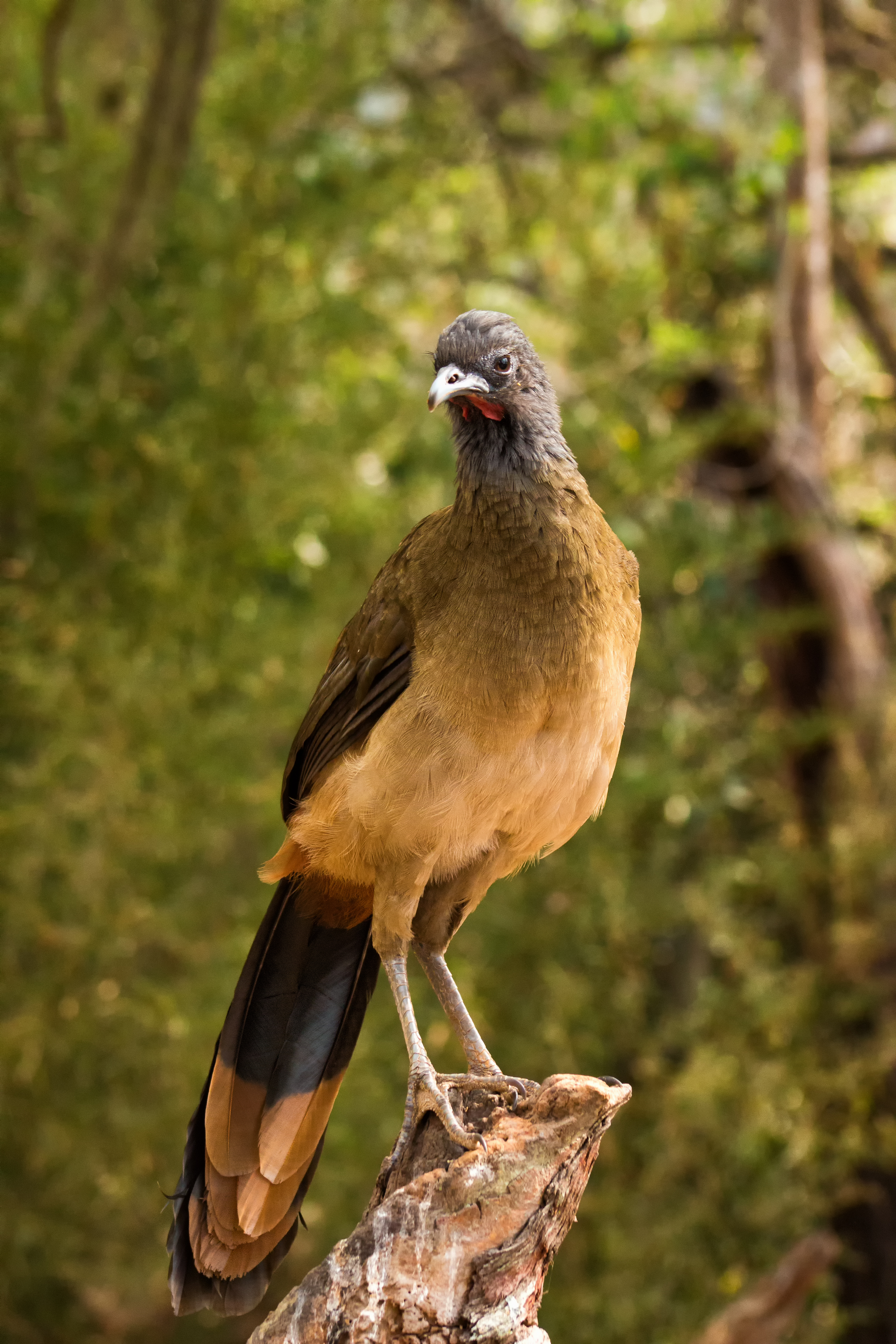
Cocrico

The national birds of Trinidad and Tobago are the scarlet ibis and the cocrico. The scarlet ibis is kept safe by the government by living in the Caroni Bird Sanctuary which was set up by the government for the protection of these birds. The Cocrico is more indigenous to the island of Tobago and is more likely to be seen in the forest. The hummingbird is considered another symbol of Trinidad and Tobago due to its significance to the Indigenous peoples, however, it is not a national bird.

=== National Instrument ===
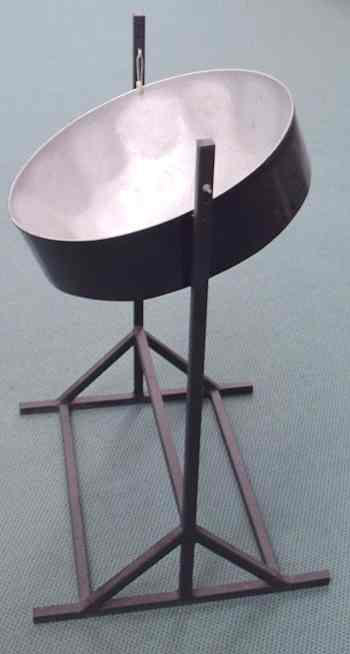
Steelpan, the national instrument

The steelpan was approved by both Houses of Parliament to be the National instrument of Trinidad and Tobago on January 13 and 21, 2025. The steelpan is also featured in the Coat of Arms.

== See also ==
- List of Trinidad and Tobago–related topics
- Outline of Trinidad and Tobago
- List of Trinidadians and Tobagonians
- CARICOM
- Healthcare in Trinidad and Tobago

== Cited sources ==
- Carmichael, Gertrude (1961). The History of the West Indian Islands of Trinidad and Tobago, 1498–1900. London: Alvin Redman.
- Kiely, Ray (1996). The Politics of Labour and Development in Trinidad. Press University of the West Indies. ISBN 9789766400170.
- Williams, Eric (1964). History of the People of Trinidad and Tobago. New York: Frederick A. Praeger. LCCN 64-13390.
- Ramkissoon, Harold; Kahwa, Ishenkumba A. (2015). "Caricom" (PDF). UNESCO Science Report: towards 2030. Paris: UNESCO. pp. 156–173. ISBN 978-92-3-100129-1.
- Rough Guides (2018). The Rough Guide to Trinidad and Tobago.
- This article incorporates text from a free content work. Licensed under CC BY-SA IGO 3.0. Text taken from UNESCO Science Report: towards 2030, 156–173, Harold Ramkissoon & Ishenkumba A. Kahwa, UNESCO Publishing.
