= People's Democratic Party (Trinidad and Tobago) =

- Abbreviation: DLP
- Leader: Bhadase Sagan Maraj
- Founder: Bhadase Sagan Maraj
- Founded: 1953
- Dissolved: 1957
- Succeeded by: 17 parties: Democratic Labour Party; LP; UDLP; DLP (Note: Democratic Liberation Party; not to be confused with the Democratic Labour Party); SIP; SDLP; WINP; WFP; ULF; NAR; CLUB '88; UNC; COP; PF; ILP; MUP; NTU
- Headquarters: Champ Fleurs, Trinidad and Tobago
- Labor wing: All Trinidad Sugar Estates and Factory Workers Union (de facto)
- Religious wing: Sanatan Dharma Maha Sabha (de facto)
- Ideology: Labourism; Civic nationalism Anti-communism; Liberal conservatism Agrarianism; Indo-Trinidadian and Tobagonian civil rights Hindu and Muslim religious rights
- Political position: Big tent
- Regional affiliation: West Indies Democratic Labour Party (1957)
- Colors: Yellow

Election symbol
- Wheel

The People's Democratic Party was a political party in Trinidad and Tobago formed in 1953. Under the leadership of Bhadase Sagan Maraj it contested the 1956 General Elections, capturing 5 of 24 elected seats in the Legislative Council and 20.3% of the vote. In 1957 it joined the Federal Democratic Labour Party and later co-founded the Trinidad and Tobago Democratic Labour Party, together with the Trinidad Labour Party and the Party of Political Progress Groups.
