= Father of the Nation =

Honorific title

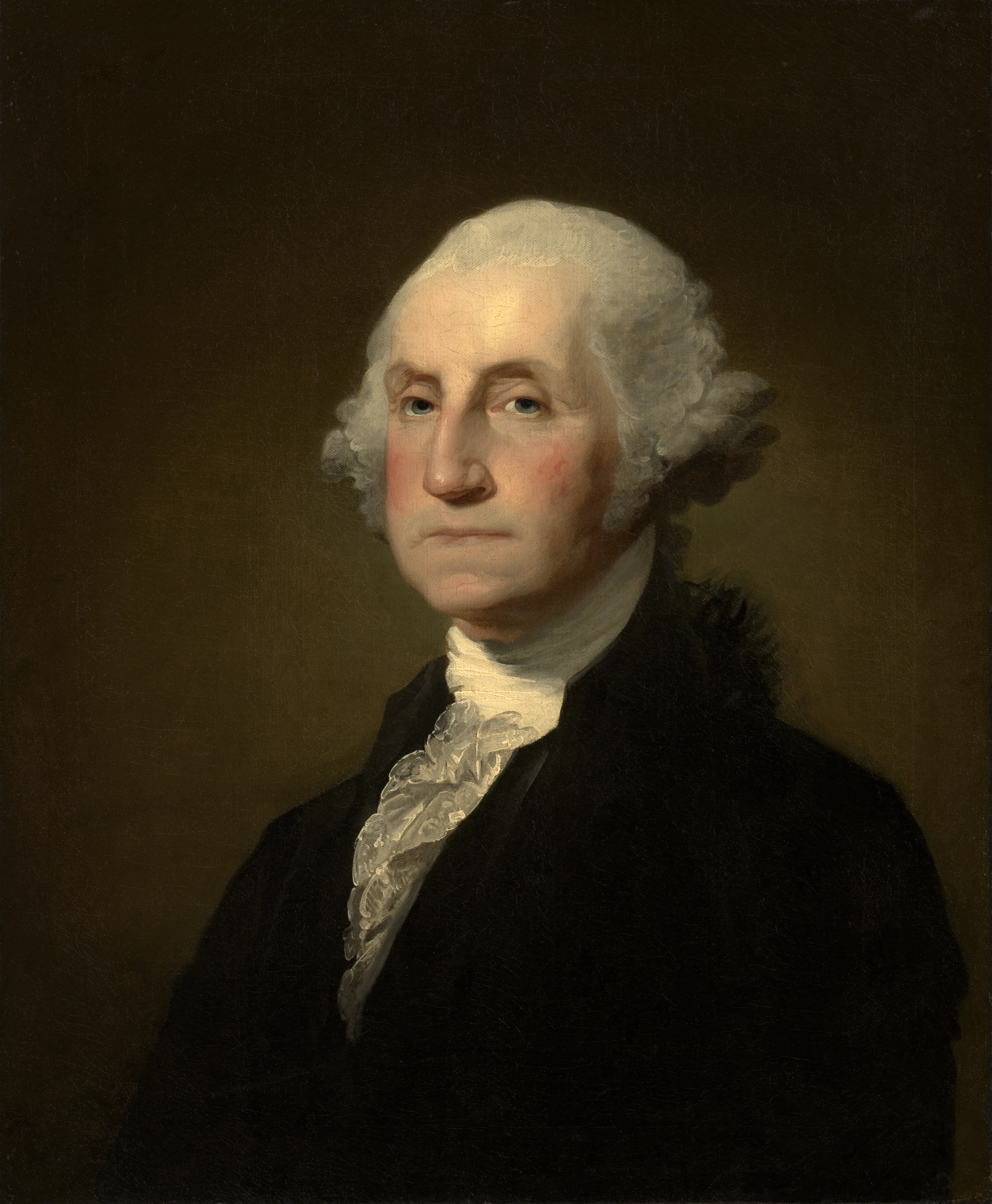
George Washington, commander of the Continental Army during the American Revolutionary War, president of the Constitutional Convention, and the first president of the United States, is commonly considered the Father of the Nation in the United States.

Father of the Nation is an honorific title given to a person considered the driving force behind the establishment of a country, state, or nation. Pater Patriae was a Roman honorific meaning the "Father of the Fatherland", bestowed by the Senate on heroes, and later on emperors. In monarchies, the monarch is often considered the "father/mother of the nation" or as a patriarch to guide his family. This concept is expressed in the divine right of kings espoused in some monarchies, while in others it is codified into constitutional law.

== History ==
In the United States, George Washington, commander of the Continental Army during the American Revolutionary War, president of the Constitutional Convention, and the first president of the United States, is commonly considered the Father of the Nation. In Spain, the monarch is considered the personification and embodiment, the symbol of unity and permanence of the nation. In Thailand, the monarch is given the same recognition, and any person who expresses disrespect toward the reigning monarch faces severe criminal penalties.

Many dictators bestow titles upon themselves, which rarely survive the end of their regime. Gnassingbé Eyadéma of Togo's titles included "father of the nation", "older brother", and "Guide of the People". Mobutu Sese Seko, president of Zaire from 1971 to 1997, was referred to as "Father of the nation", "the Guide", "the Messiah", "the Leopard", "the Sun-President", and "the Cock who Jumps on Anything That Moves". In postcolonial Africa, "father of the nation" was a title used by many leaders both to refer to their role in the independence movement as a source of legitimacy, and to use paternalist symbolism as a source of continued popularity. On Joseph Stalin's seventieth birthday in 1949, he was bestowed with the title "Father of Nations" for his establishment of "people's democracies" in countries occupied by the USSR after World War II.

The title "Father of the Nation" is sometimes politically contested. The 1972 Constitution of Bangladesh declared Sheikh Mujibur Rahman to be "father of the nation". A motion in the Parliament of Slovakia to proclaim controversial pre-war leader Andrej Hlinka "father of the nation" barely failed in September 2007.

== List ==
The following people are still often called the "Father" or "Mother" of their respective nations.

Name	Nation	Title (native)	Title (translation)	Notes
Ahmad Shah Durrani	Afghanistan	Ahmad Shāh Baba	Ahmad Shah the Father	Founder of the Afghan Durrani Empire
Mohammad Zahir Shah	Afghanistan	Baba-e-Millat	Father of the Nation	Last and longest-reigning king of Afghanistan (1933–1973)
Skanderbeg	Albania	Heroi Kombëtar; Dragoi i Shqipërisë	National Hero; Dragon of Albania	Resisted the Ottoman conquest of Albania and delayed Ottoman advances into Western Europe
Ismail Qemali	Albania	Babai Kombit	Father of the Nation	Led the Albanian national movement against the Ottoman Empire
Ahmed Ben Bella	Algeria	أبو الأمة ('abu al'uma)	Father of the Nation	First President of Algeria and first Prime Minister of Algeria
Agostinho Neto	Angola	Pai da Nação	Father of the Nation	Leader of the MPLA during the Angolan War of Independence and the first President of Angola.
V. C. Bird	Antigua and Barbuda	Father of the Nation	Father of the Nation	First prime minister of Antigua and Barbuda and founder of the Antigua and Barbuda Labour Party.
José de San Martín	Argentina; Chile; Peru	Padre de la Patria / Fundador de la República y Protector del Perú	Father of the Homeland / Founder of the Republic and Protector of Peru	Primary leader of the Argentine War of Independence and the Spanish American wars of independence in southern South America
María Remedios del Valle	Argentina	Madre de la Patria	Mother of the Homeland	Important officer in the Argentine Army during the War of Independence, referred to as the "Mother of the Homeland" since her lifetime. In 1829, the Chamber of Representatives of the province of Buenos Aires named her "Mother of the Homeland" and granted her the position of sergeant major.
Հայկ (Hayk)	Armenia	Նահապետ (Nahapet)	Head of the Family; Patriarch	Legendary founder of the Armenian nation
Sir Henry Parkes, GCMG	Australia	Father of Federation	Father of Federation	Gave the Tenterfield Oration, which is believed to be pivotal in the process of the Federation of Australia.
Mahammad Amin Rasulzade	Azerbaijan	Millətin Atası	Father of the Nation	The founder of the Azerbaijan Democratic Republic, considered by many to be the founding father of the nation.
Heydar Aliyev	Azerbaijan	Böyük Lider	Great Leader	3rd President of Azerbaijan from 1993 to his death in 2003, considered the founder of the modern Azerbaijani state.
Sir Lynden Pindling	The Bahamas	Father of the Nation	Father of the Nation	Leader at independence in 1973.
Sheikh Mujibur Rahman	Bangladesh	বঙ্গবন্ধু (Bangabandhu)	Founding president / Architecture of Independence	Founding leader of Bangladesh. Leader during the Bangladesh Liberation War.
Errol Barrow	Barbados	Father of Independence	Father of Independence	The third and final premier of Barbados, serving from 1961 to 1966, who lead Barbados to independence from the British Empire in 1966. He became the first prime minister and served three terms (1966–76, 1986–87) dying in office of illness during his third.
Konstanty Kalinowski	Belarus	Стваральнік беларускага народу (Stvaralnik bielaruskaha narodu)	Creator of the Belarusian Nation	Used among other titles. Military and political leader during the January Uprising. Usage opposed by those who view Kalinowski's nationality as Polish, rather than Belarusian.
George Cadle Price	Belize	Father of the Nation	Father of the Nation	Former Chief Minister, Premier and two-term Prime Minister before retiring in 1997.
Simón Bolívar	Bolivia; Colombia; Ecuador; Panama; Peru; Venezuela	El Libertador	The Liberator	Primary leader of the Spanish American wars of independence in northern South America.
Seretse Khama	Botswana	Rra Boipuso	Father of Independence	Leader of the independence movement and first President of Botswana. Creator of democracy in Botswana
Dom Pedro I, Maria Leopoldina of Austria and José Bonifácio de Andrada e Silva	Brazil	Pai da Pátria e Patriarca da Independência	Father of the Nation and Patriarch of Independence	Founder and the first Emperor of Brazil (1822) during the independence of Brazil. Maria Leopoldina was the first Empress of Brazil. Bonifácio was the advisor of Pedro I.
Omar Ali Saifuddien III	Brunei	Arkitek Brunei Moden; Pembina Negara Moden; Bapa Kemerdekaan	Architect of Modern Brunei. Builder of the Modern Nation and Father of Independence	28th Sultan of Brunei and First Minister of Defence (1914–1986).
Vasil Levski	Bulgaria	Апостола на свободата (Apostola na svobodata)	Apostle of Freedom	Main revolutionary who fought for the independence of Bulgaria from Ottoman rule
Thomas Sankara	Burkina Faso	Père de la nation Héros du Burkina Faso	Father of The Nation and Hero of Burkina Faso	First president of Burkina Faso. Renamed the country from Upper Volta to Burkina Faso and writer of the national anthem, Ditanyè.
Louis Rwagasore	Burundi	Père de l'indépendance	Father of Independence	Burundi independence movement leader, second and youngest Prime Minister of Burundi and Crown Prince of the Kingdom of Burundi.
Norodom Sihanouk	Cambodia	សម្តេចឪ (Sâmdéch Âu)	King Father	Secured independence from France.
John A. Macdonald and the other Fathers of Confederation	Canada	Fathers of Confederation; Pères de la Confédération	Father of Confederation	The 36 Canadian politicians who negotiated Canadian Confederation
Bernardo O'Higgins	Chile	Padre de la patria	Father of the fatherland	Principal leader of the Chilean War of Independence
Sun Yat-sen	China, Republic of	國父 (Guófù)	Father of the Nation	Sun played an instrumental role in the overthrow of the Qing dynasty during the Xinhai Revolution. The Nationalist government decreed the title in 1940. Sun is more widely known in the People's Republic of China as the "Forerunner of the Revolution".
José María Castro Madriz	Costa Rica	Fundador de la República	Founder of the Republic	First President of the Republic of Costa Rica.
Ante Starčević	Croatia	Otac domovine	Father of the Homeland	His diverse activities and works laid the foundations for the modern Croatian state.
Carlos Manuel de Céspedes	Cuba	Padre de la Patria	Father of the Fatherland	Leader of the first Cuban independence movement which fought the Ten Years' War.
Archbishop Makarios III	Cyprus	Εθνάρχης (Ethnárchis)	Ethnarch	First and longest President of Cyprus, leader of Greek Cypriot nationalist movement during Cypriot intercommunal violence
Charles IV, Holy Roman Emperor	Czech Republic	Otec vlasti	Father of the Homeland	King of Bohemia. Title coined by the rector of the Charles University of Prague at the emperor's funeral.
František Palacký	Czech Republic	Otec národa	Father of the Nation	Politician and historian, influential in Czech National Revival movement. Whereas vlast "homeland" included all inhabitants, národ "nation" comprised only Czech people.
Tomáš Masaryk	Czech Republic	Tatíček / Prezident Osvoboditel	Father of the Fatherland / President Liberator	First President of Czechoslovakia, helped negotiate establishment of Czechoslovakia with the Allies of World War I.
Juan Pablo Duarte	Dominican Republic	Padre de la Patria	Father of the Fatherland	Foremost of the founding fathers of the Dominican Republic and the key leader responsible for shaping the modern revolutionary ideology that opposed all foreign rule.
Pedro Santana	Dominican Republic	Libertador de la Patria	Liberator of the Fatherland	Served as the first President of the Dominican Republic and helped free the country from Haitian rule.
Presbyter, Dr. José Matías Delgado	El Salvador	Padre de la patria	Father of the fatherland	One of the founding fathers of El Salvador, and principal leader of the First Shout of Independence.
Ilia Chavchavadze	Georgia	უგვირგვინო მეფე (Ugvirgvino Mepe) ერის მამა (Eris Mama)	The Crownless King / Father of the Nation	Promoted Georgian language, literature, culture, and church autocephaly under imperial Russian rule.
Members of the Parlamentarischer Rat	Germany	Väter und Mütter des Grundgesetzes	Fathers and mothers of the Basic Law	Drafted the Basic Law, the constitution of (then West) Germany
Kwame Nkrumah	Ghana	Osagyefo	Father of the nation	First president and prime minister of Ghana during decolonization, the first country in Sub-Saharan Africa to achieve full independence.
Alexander the Great	Greece	Πατέρας των Ελλήνων (Patéras ton Ellínon)	Father of the Greeks	Founder of the Macedonian Empire responsible for spreading Greek culture during the Hellenistic period.
Sir Eric Gairy	Grenada	Father of Independence	Father of Independence	First Prime Minister of Grenada. Secured independence from the United Kingdom
Cheddi Jagan	Guyana	Father of the Nation	Father of the Nation	President of Guyana from 1992 to 1997.
Jean-Jacques Dessalines and Toussaint Louverture	Haiti	Père de la patrie	Father of the Fatherland	Primary leaders of the Haitian Revolution.
Dionisio de Herrera	Honduras	Padre de la Patria	Father of the Fatherland	First Head of State of Honduras within the Federal Republic of Central America
Árpád	Hungary	Honalapító	Founder of the Homeland	Second Grand Prince of the Hungarians, leader of the Hungarian conquest of the Carpathian basin.
Mahatma Gandhi	India	राष्ट्रपिता (Rashtrapita); Bapu (Father)	Father of the Nation	Leader of the Indian independence movement from British Raj.
Soepomo; Mohammad Yamin; Sukarno; Mohammad Hatta; Sutan Sjahrir	Indonesia	Bapak Bangsa; Sang Proklamator; Dwitunggal	Father(s) of the Nation; The Proclamators; Duumvirate	Main leaders of the Indonesian National Revolution, wrote and signed the Proclamation of Indonesian Independence, as well as served as the first President and Vice President of Indonesia, respectively.
Cyrus the Great	Iran (Persia)	Shahanshah	King of Kings	The founder of the first Persian Empire
David Ben-Gurion	Israel	Israel's founding father	Father of the Nation	Formally proclaimed the establishment of Israel and served as its first prime minister
Theodor Herzl	Israel	חוֹזֵה הַמְדִינָה (Chozeh HaMedinah, lit. 'Visionary of the State')	Spiritual Father of the Jewish State	Father of modern political Zionism
Julius Caesar	Italy	Pater Patriae	Father of the Fatherland	Gave the Roman citizenship to all the inhabitants of the Italian Peninsula
Augustus	Italy	Pater Patriae	Father of the Fatherland	Gave administrative unity to the Italian Peninsula, by defining the regions of Roman Italy.
Camillo Benso; Giuseppe Garibaldi; Giuseppe Mazzini; Victor Emmanuel II of Italy	Italy	Padre della Patria	Father of the Fatherland	Authors of Italian unification
Kerei Khan and Janibek Khan	Kazakhstan	Негізін қалаушылар (Negızın qalauşylar)	Founders	Founders and first rulers of the Kazakh Khanate, who led the Kazakh War of Independence against the Uzbek Khanate and established the first independent Kazakh state.
Jomo Kenyatta	Kenya	Baba wa Taifa	Father of the Nation/Freedom Fighter	First President of Kenya from 1963 to his death in 1978 who helped create the Kenyan Constitution.
Ibrahim Rugova	Kosovo	Ati Themeltar Ati i Kombit	Founding Father Father of the Nation	First president of the First Republic of Kosovo. President of Serbian Autonomous Province of Kosovo and Metochia under UN administration after the Kosovo War.
Muammar Gaddafi	Libya	أبو الأمة ('abu al'uma)	Father of the Nation	Leader of Libya from 1969 to 2011. He styled himself as the Father of the Nation, in addition to using other titles. He was also styled as such by Libyan state media.
Jonas Basanavičius	Lithuania	Tautos patriarchas	Patriarch of the Nation	Various cultural activities during the Lithuanian National Revival.
Tunku Abdul Rahman	Malaysia	Bapa Kemerdekaan; Bapa Malaysia	Father of Independence; Father of Malaysia	The first Prime Minister of Malaysia. A prince from the Kedah Sultanate, the Cambridge-educated Tunku led the negotiated independence of Federation of Malaya from the British Empire in 1957. Later formed Malaysia through the union of Peninsular Malaya, Singapore, North Borneo and Sarawak in 1963.
Giorgio Borġ Olivier	Malta	Missier Malta Indipendenti	Father of Independent Malta	First post-independence Prime Minister of Malta between 1950–1955 and 1962–1971.
Dom Mintoff	Malta	Missier Malta Repubblika; Missier Malta Hielsa	Father of Republican Malta; Father of Free Malta	A Maltese statesman and leading politician. He twice served as Prime Minister of Malta (from 1955 to 1958, and from 1974 to 1984) as the Leader of the Labour Party, a position he held from 1949 to 1984. In 1974, with him as Prime Minister, Malta negotiated a series of constitutional reforms leading to the establishment of the Maltese Republic and the removal of the British monarch as head of state. In 1979, the last Royal Navy ships left Malta, marking the country's transformation into a fully independent nation. Mintoff is also credited with the establishment of the Maltese welfare state and the socialist-style nationalisation and collectivisation of various key industries.
Sir Seewoosagur Ramgoolam	Mauritius	Father of the Nation	Father of the Nation	First post-independence Prime Minister, in 1968.
Miguel Hidalgo y Costilla	Mexico	Padre de la patria mexicana	Father of the Mexican Nation	First revolutionary leader in the Mexican War of Independence.
Genghis Khan	Mongolia	Монголчуудын эцэг (Mongolčuudyn eceg)	Father of the Mongols, Founding Father of Mongolia	After unifying the many nomadic tribes of northeastern Asian steppe peoples, Genghis Khan founded the Mongol Empire and became the first Great Khan and Emperor. He eventually led a conquest of the majority of Eurasia, and his unified homeland would become Mongolia.
Mohammed V	Morocco	أَب الْأُمَّة (ʔab al-ʔumma)	Father of the Nation	King of Morocco during its independence in 1956, seen by most Moroccans as Father of the Nation.
Aung San	Myanmar	နိုင်ငံ‌တော်၏ဖခင်၊; လွတ်လပ်ရေးဖခင်၊; တပ်မတော်၏ဖခင်	Father of Nation, Father of Independence, Father of Tatmadaw (Burmese Army)	He was the founder of Tatmadaw (Burmese Army) and he was the 5th Prime Minister of Burma during the British Era from 1946 to 1947. He was instrumental in Myanmar's struggle for independence from British rule, but he was assassinated just six months before his goal was realized.
Sam Nujoma	Namibia	Founding Father of the Namibian Nation	Founding Father of the Namibian Nation	Primary leader of SWAPO during the South African Border War and first President of Namibia, 1990–2005; title conferred by Act of Parliament in 2005.
Prithvi Narayan Shah	Nepal	श्री ५ बडामहाराजधिराज पृथ्वी नारायण शाह (śrī 5 baḍāmhārājdhirāj pr̥thvī nārāyaṇ śāha)	Father of the Nation	King of Nepal during the Unification of Nepal.
William the Silent	Netherlands	Vader des Vaderlands	Father of the Fatherland	Leader of the successful Dutch Revolt against the Spanish Empire, which led to the Dutch Republic, the first independent Dutch state.
Diriangén	Nicaragua	Padre de la Patria Nicaragüense	Father of the Nicaraguan Fatherland	Native Nicaraguan tribal leader
José Núñez	Nicaragua	Salvador de la Patria	Savior of the Fatherland	First president of independent Nicaragua following its secession from the Federal Republic of Central America.
Nnamdi Azikiwe	Nigeria	Father of Nigerian Nationalism	Father of Nigerian Nationalism	First president of Nigeria when it became a republic on 1 October 1963, and was the last governor general of Nigeria.
Krste Misirkov	North Macedonia	Татко на нацијата (Tatko na nacijata)	Father of the Nation	Prominent linguist, writer and activist.
Einar Gerhardsen	Norway	Landsfaderen	Father of the Nation	First post–World War II prime minister of Norway.
Kim Il Sung	North Korea	주체조선의 영원한 수령 (juchejoseonui yeong'wonhan suryeong)	Eternal Leader	Founder of the North Korean state, progenitor of Juche, and General Secretary of the Workers' Party of Korea from 1949 to 1994.
Qaboos bin Said	Oman	أَبُو الْأُمَّة (ʔabū al-ʔumma)	Father of the Nation	Sultan from 1970 to 2020, transitioned the country to independence from Britain and promulgated the Basic Statute of Oman.
Muhammad Ali Jinnah	Pakistan	بابائے قوم (Baba-e-Qaum); قائدِ اعظم (Quaid-e-Azam)	Father of the Nation Great Leader	Led the Pakistan Movement and served as the first governor-general of Pakistan.
Yasser Arafat	Palestine	أبو فلسطين ('abu filastin)	The Father of Palestine	Led the Palestinian liberation movement and served as president of the State of Palestine from 1994 to 2004.
Sir Michael Somare	Papua New Guinea	Papa Blo Kantri	Father of the Nation	Leader at independence in 1975; also known as "the chief" and "the old man".
Emilio Aguinaldo	Philippines	Kauna-unahang Pangulo ng Pilipinas	First President of the Philippines	Military Leader of the Philippine Revolution and the First President of the Philippines through the 1899 Malolos Congress, which oversaw the promulgation of the Malolos Constitution. His birthday, 22 March 1869, is celebrated as Emilio Aguinaldo Day.
Andrés Bonifacio	Philippines	Amá ng Himagsikan	Father of the Revolution	Political Leader of the Philippine Revolution, which saw armed resistance against the Spanish Empire. His birthday, 30 November 1863, is a national holiday.
José Rizal	Philippines	Pambansáng Bayani	National Hero	Colloquially known as the "National Hero". Rizal's works and writings–which helped start the Philippine Revolution–are part of the national curriculum as mandated by Republic Act No. 1425. The anniversary of his 30 December 1896 execution by the Spanish colonial government is a national holiday.
Ignacy Daszyński, Roman Dmowski, Wojciech Korfanty, Ignacy Jan Paderewski, Józef Piłsudski, Wincenty Witos	Poland	Ojcowie Niepodległości, Ojcowie Polski Odrodzonej	Fathers of Independence, Fathers of Reborn Poland	After World War I six fathers of independence jointly took advantage of the favorable conditions and led to the birth of the Second Polish Republic.
Mieszko I	Poland	Twórca państwa polskiego	Founder of the Polish state	Mieszko I united slavic tribes of Poland, baptized the country and became the first historical ruler of Poland.
Dom Afonso I of Portugal	Portugal	Fundador da Nacionalidade	Founder of Nationhood a.k.a. The Conqueror	Founder and first King of Portugal (1139), recognized by the Holy See in 1179.
Peter I of Russia	Russia	Отец Отечества (Otec Otečestva)	Father of the Fatherland	Was granted the title in 1721 by the Governing Senate, along with "Emperor of Russia" and "The Great".
Sir John Compton	Saint Lucia	Father of the Nation	Father of the Nation	Prime Minister at independence in 1979. Also known as "Daddy Compton".
Ibn Saud of Saudi Arabia	Saudi Arabia	وَالِد الْأُمَّة (Wālid al-ʔumma)/الْمُؤَسِّس (Al-Muʔassis)	Father of the Nation/The Founder	Unified the tribes of the Arabian Peninsula and established the modern Saudi state. He descended from the noble House of Saud, the dynasty which had ruled most of Arabia in the 18th century. His son King Salman is the current head of state of Saudi Arabia. Five other older sons – Saud, Faisal, Khalid, Fahd and Abdullah – served as former heads of state.
Donald Dewar	Scotland	Father of the Nation	Father of the Nation	The inaugural holder of the office of First Minister of Scotland following the reconvening of the Scottish Parliament in 1999. He is known as the Father of the Nation for his role in overseeing the introduction of Scottish devolution.
Saint Sava	Serbia	Отац отаџбине (Otac otadžbine)	Father of the Fatherland	Founder of the Serbian Orthodox Church.
Karađorđe and Miloš the Great	Serbia	Отац нације (Otac nacije)	Father of the Nation	Leaders of the First and Second Serbian Uprising during the Serbian Revolution.
Dobrica Ćosić	Serbia	Отац нације (Otac nacije)	Father of the Nation	Yugoslav and Serbian politician, writer, and political theorist.
Lee Kuan Yew	Singapore	国父 (Guófù)	Father of Singapore	First Prime Minister of the Republic of Singapore, governing for over 30 years. Leading figure throughout Singapore's time as a part of Malaysia and its later independence.
Primož Trubar and Janez Bleiweis	Slovenia	Oče naroda	Father of the Nation	A consolidator of Slovene and the author of the first Slovene printed book (Trubar) and a politician, national awakener and promotor of the United Slovenia political program (Bleiweis).
Ahmed Gurey	Somalia	Aabaha qaranka	Father of the fatherland	The sultan of the Adal sultanate.
Nelson Mandela	South Africa	Tata wethu	Our Father	Primary leader of internal resistance to apartheid as chairman of the African National Congress, and first President of post-apartheid South Africa.
Catholic Monarchs (Ferdinand and Isabella)	Spain	Reyes Católicos de los reinos de Castilla y Aragón	Catholic Monarchs of the Kingdoms of Castille and Aragon	The unifiers of Spain. They unified the territories of Castille, Aragon and Al-Andalus, all the territories of the Iberian Peninsula, except Portugal. During their reign America was discovered and started the Spanish Empire.
Don Stephen Senanayake	Sri Lanka	ජාතියේ පියා (Jātiyē Piyā)	Father of the Nation	First Prime Minister, from 1947 to 1952.
Johan Ferrier	Suriname	Vader des Vaderlands	Father of the Nation	First president after the independence of the country in 1975 (the term Vader des Vaderlands has its roots in the Netherlands).
Gustav I of Sweden	Sweden	Landsfader	Father of the Nation	Led Sweden out of the Kalmar Union.
Per Albin Hansson	Sweden	Landsfader	Father of the Nation	Prime Minister 1932–1946 and founder of The People's Home.
Julius Nyerere	Tanzania	Baba wa Taifa	Father of the Nation	First President of Tanzania.
Henry Alcazar, Victor Bryan, Tubal Uriah Butler, Rudranath Capildeo, Simbhoonath Capildeo, Arthur Andrew Cipriani, Albert Gomes, Solomon Hochoy, A. P. T. James, Audrey Jeffers, Ranjit Kumar, Emmanuel Mzumbo Lazare, Chanka Maharaj, Bhadase Sagan Maraj, Quintin O'Connor, Michael Pocock, Adrian Cola Rienzi (Krishna Deonarine), Alfred Richards, Harold Robinson, Timothy Roodal, Lionel Seukeran, Ashford Sinanan, Mitra Sinanan, Sarran Teelucksingh, Louis de Verteuil, Gerald Wight, Eric Williams, Hugh Wooding	Trinidad and Tobago	Moulders of the Nation	Moulders of the Nation	They helped shape the country's future as an independent nation and laid the foundation of democracy.
Eric Williams	Trinidad and Tobago	Father of the Nation	Father of the Nation	First and three-term Prime Minister of Trinidad and Tobago from 1956 to his death in 1981, first Premier of Trinidad and Tobago from 1961 to 1966, second Chief Minister of Trinidad and Tobago from 1956 to 1961, founder of the People's National Movement (PNM) and was instrumental in writing the Trinidad and Tobago constitution and gaining the country independence and republicanism from British rule.
Habib Bourguiba	Tunisia	الْمُجَاهِد الْأَكْبَر (al-Mujāhid Al-ʔakbar)	The Supreme Warrior	Father of the independence of Tunisia and first President of Tunisia. He led the Tunisian national movement against the French colonial empire. After Tunisian independence, he founded a modern state, built schools and hospitals and gave the Tunisian women rights that are still unique in the Arab World today.
Mustafa Kemal Atatürk	Turkey	Atatürk	Father of the Turks (always used as a last name and not a title proper)	Founder of the Republic of Turkey and first President of Turkey. He led the Turkish national movement in the Turkish War of Independence, and enacted the reforms that made Turkey a democratic nation-state. Granted in accordance with the 1934 Surname Law establishing surnames in Turkey.
Saparmurat Niyazov	Turkmenistan	Türkmenbaşy	Father of the Turkmen	Inaugural president as well as president for life of Turkmenistan, he ruled the country with an iron fist from 1991 to 2006.
Bohdan Khmelnytsky	Ukraine	Батько нації (Batʹko natsiyi)	Father of the Nation	Leader of the Khmelnytsky Uprising against the Polish–Lithuanian Commonwealth and founder of the Cossack Hetmanate, the first independent Ukrainian state.
Taras Shevchenko	Ukraine	Батько нації (Batʹko natsiyi)	Father of the Nation	Preserver of Ukrainian language and literature from Russification during Tsarist rule.
Sheikh Zayed bin Sultan Al Nahyan	United Arab Emirates	وَالِد الْأُمَّة (Wālid al-ʔumma)	Father of the Nation	President of the UAE for its first 33 years (1971–2004).
George Washington, John Adams, Thomas Jefferson, James Madison, John Jay, Alexander Hamilton, Benjamin Franklin and other Signers and Framers	United States	Founding Fathers	Founding Fathers	The Signers signed the United States Declaration of Independence in 1776. The Framers were delegates to the Constitutional Convention and took part in framing or drafting the proposed United States Constitution.
George Washington	United States	Father of His Country	Father of His Country	George Washington is particularly highlighted out of the Founding Fathers of the United States as being the "father of his country" for his role as the commander-in-chief of the Continental Army during the American Revolutionary War, his resignation of command at the end of the war, the presidency of the Constitutional Convention and for his tenure (and voluntary retirement) as the first President of the United States.
José Gervasio Artigas	Uruguay	Padre de la independencia uruguaya, Protector de los Pueblos Libres y Jefe de los orientales	Father of Uruguayan independence, Defender of the Free and Chief of the eastern people	Fought against the Spanish Royalists for independence in the Río de la Plata.
Ho Chi Minh	Vietnam	Cha già dân tộc	Father of the people	Leader of the Viet Minh, who fought for independence from France in the First Indochina War and decisively defeated them at the bloody Battle of Dien Bien Phu, resulting in the establishment of an independent Democratic Republic of Vietnam in the north of the country in 1954. Vietnam would eventually be united under Communist Party of Vietnam rule after his death with the Fall of Saigon at the end of the Vietnam War in 1975.
Rhodri Morgan	Wales	Tad y Genedl	Father of the Nation	First Minister of Wales from 2000 to 2009. He is credited with stabilising Welsh devolution after the short and unstable premiership of his predecessor, the first First Minister Alun Michael.
El-Ouali Mustapha Sayed	Western Sahara	أبو الأمة ('abu al'uma)	Father of the Nation	Leader of the Polisario Front, First President of the SADR. Fought against Spanish colonial army & against the invasion of the Moroccan and Mauritanian armies in the Western Sahara conflict.
Kenneth Kaunda	Zambia	Tata	Father of the nation	First president of Zambia from 1964 to 1991. He founded the Zambian African National Congress (ANC), later becoming the head of the United National Independence Party (UNIP) which led to attaining independence.

== See also ==
- Fathers of Confederation
- Founding fathers of the European Union
- Founding Fathers of the United States
- List of national founders
- List of people considered father or mother of a field
- Pater Patriae
- Victory title
