= Democratic Labour Party (Trinidad and Tobago) =

- Abbreviation: DLP
- Leader: Bhadase Sagan Maraj (1957-1960); Rudranath Capildeo (1960-1969); Albert Gomes (1963); Vernon Jamadar (1969-1972); Alloy Lequay (1972); Successor Factions: SDLP-Vernon Jamadar (1972-1976); UDLP-Simbhoonath Capildeo (1972-1976); WINP-Ashford Sastri Sinanan (1974-1976)
- Founder: 11 founders: Bhadase Sagan Maraj; Albert Gomes; Ashford Sastri Sinanan; A. P. T. James; Alexander Bustamante; Surujpat Mathura; Victor Bryan; Stephen Carpoondeo Maharaj; Carlton Achong; W. W. James; Louis Rostant
- Founded: 1 September 1957
- Dissolved: DLP factions split into three parties in 1972; DLP's successor factions end in 1976
- Merger of: PDP; TLP; POPPG; BP; UF; EINA (Note: East Indian National Association); EINC (Note: East Indian National Congress)
- Succeeded by: 16 parties: LP; UDLP (Note: Bold indicates a direct successor); DLP (Note: Democratic Liberation Party; not to be confused with the Democratic Labour Party); SIP; SDLP (Note: Bold indicates a direct successor); WINP (Note: Bold indicates a direct successor); WFP; ULF; NAR; CLUB '88; UNC; COP; PF; ILP; MUP; NTU
- Headquarters: Carlton Center, San Fernando, Trinidad and Tobago
- Labor wing: All Trinidad Sugar Estates and Factory Workers Union (de facto)
- Ideology: Majority: Labourism; Civic nationalism Agrarianism; Anti-communism; Multiculturalism; Indo-Trinidadian and Tobagonian civil rights Hindu and Muslim religious rights Left-wing Faction: Social liberalism Democratic socialism Right-wing Faction: Liberal conservatism Anti-socialism (Note: Original stance of the party, however after Capildeo adopted democratic socialism in 1963 it still stood as the stance of the conservative faction of the party.)
- Political position: Big tent (originally); Centre (with centre-left and centre-right factions)
- Regional affiliation: West Indies Democratic Labour Party
- Colors: Orange

Election symbol
- Flaming torch

The Democratic Labour Party (abbr. DLP) was the main opposition party in Trinidad and Tobago from 1957 till 1976. That party was the party which opposed the People's National Movement (PNM) at the time of Independence. After several splits brought about by leadership struggles, the party lost its hold on the Indo-Trinidadian community in the 1976 General Elections and was displaced in parliament by the United Labour Front under the leadership of Basdeo Panday, a former DLP senator. The party was the representative of the ethnic Indian community in the country; however Indian Muslims and Christians were said to be less loyal to the party than Indian Hindus.

The party symbol was a flaming torch.

== Federal period ==
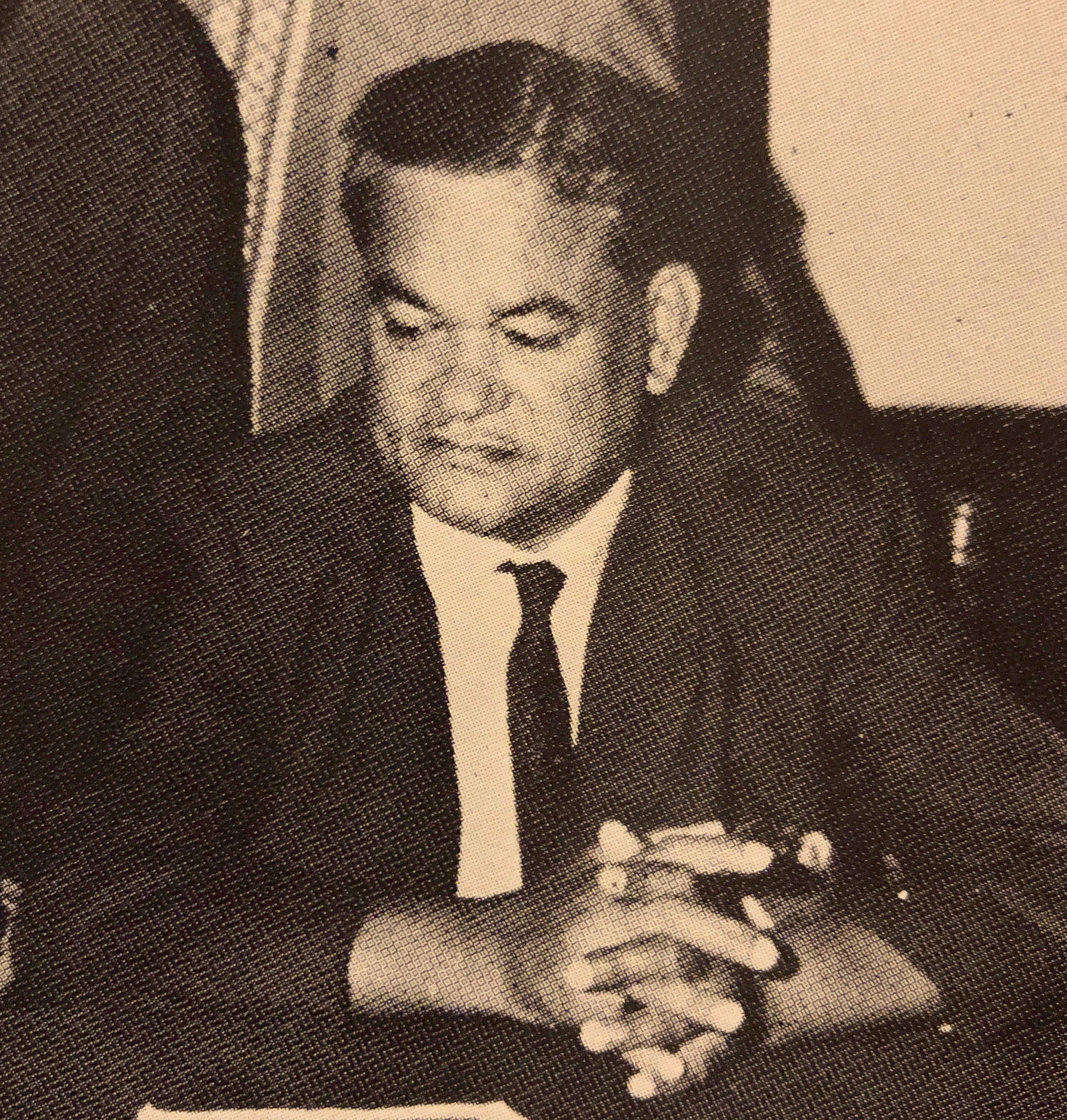
Bhadase Sagan Maraj, leader of the DLP from 1957–1960

The DLP was formed through the merger of three Opposition parties in the Legislative Council, the People's Democratic Party, the Trinidad Labour Party and the Party of Political Progress Groups. Also joining was Stephen Maharaj, a member of the Butler Party. The three parties aligned with the Democratic Labour Party of the West Indies Federation under the leadership of Sir Alexander Bustamante and merged to form a single national party. The DLP defeated the PNM in the 1958 West Indies federal elections, winning six of the ten seats in the Federal Parliament of the West Indies Federation.

Shortly thereafter the party began to disintegrate. Bhadase Sagan Maraj, the first leader of the party in the Legislative Council, became ill, bedridden and overly reliant on pethidine. Rudranath Capildeo was elected party leader in 1960; he was brought into the party to provide an "intellectual equal" to Eric Williams. When Capildeo left Trinidad to teach at the University of London in 1963, a faction of the party called a general meeting and elected Albert Gomes party leader. However, the rank and file of the party stood behind Capildeo, and the Gomes faction left the party.

== Independence era ==
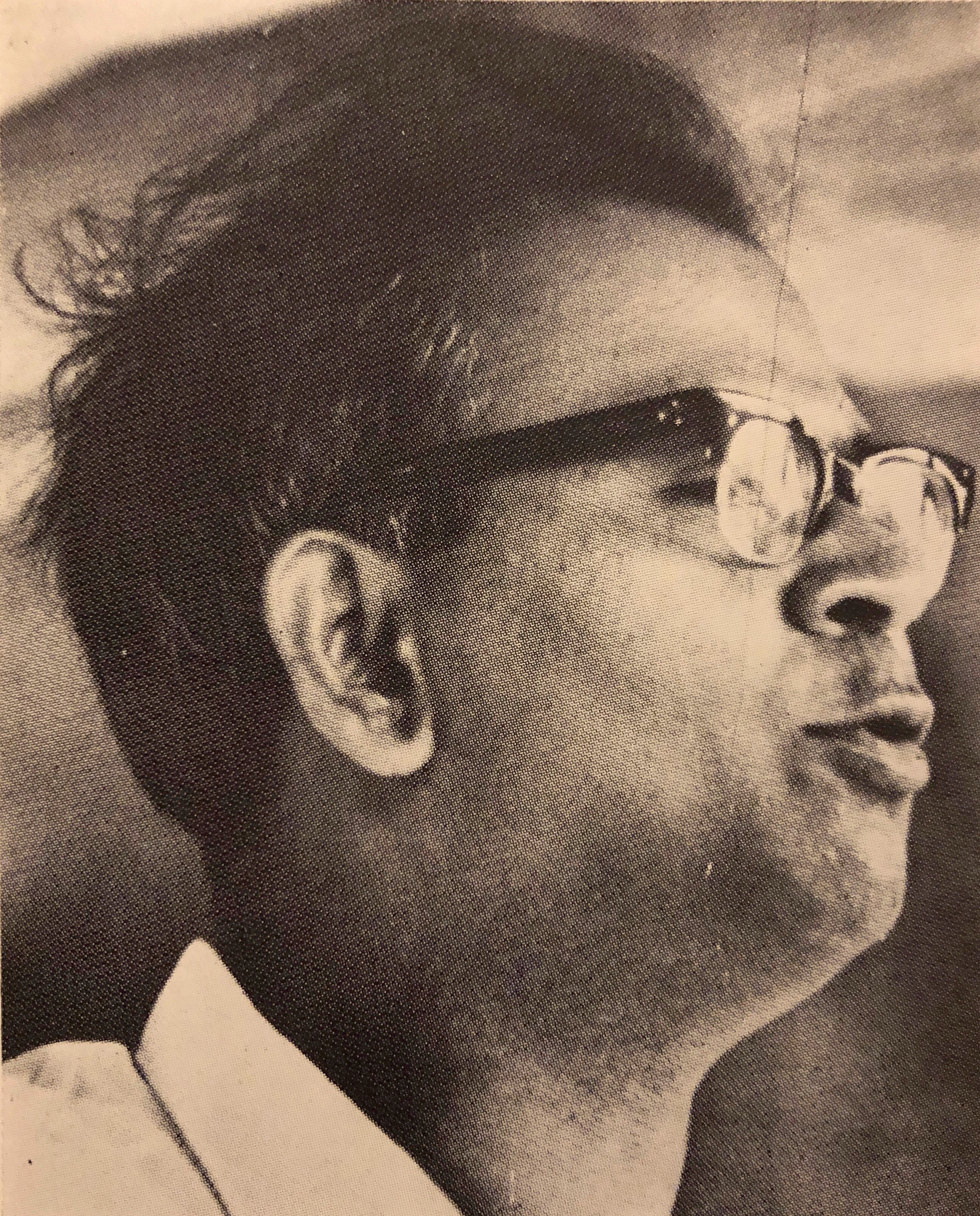
Rudranath Capildeo, leader of the DLP from 1960–1969

1961 saw the introduction of the Representation of the People Act, which changed the election process by instituting voting machines and altered the way in which constituencies were laid out. The DLP viewed this as an attempt to disenfranchise Indo-Trinidadian voters. They also accused the PNM of gerrymandering the constituencies to maximise the impact of PNM supporters and minimise the impact of DLP supporters.

Consequently, the 1961 General Election campaign was extremely tense and racially polarised. The DLP alleged that voting machines were rigged. These allegations found support when initial returns showed PNM candidate A.N.R. Robinson receiving more votes than there were registered electors in his constituency. The PNM secured a two-thirds majority (20 of 30 seats) in Parliament.The DLP won the remaining 10 seats. When the Federation was dissolved in 1961 (following the withdrawal of Jamaica), this majority allowed the PNM to write the Independence Constitution without input from the DLP. In response to allegations of voting irregularities the DLP boycotted the opening of parliament and operated largely through boycotts and walk-outs.

In 1963 Rudranath Capildeo accepted a permanent position at the University of London and attempted to run the DLP and serve as Leader of the Opposition while based in London. He was able to retain his seat in Parliament through special dispensation from the Speaker of the House of Representatives, Arnold Thomasos. In March of that year Capildeo gave the party a new creed, democratic socialism. This action, coupled with Capildeo's absentee rulership, led to a revolt in the party executive, and this resulted in the appointment of Stephen Carpoondeo Maharaj, a former Butler Party member, as Leader of the Opposition, while Capildeo retained the post of Party Leader. When the executive tried to replace Capildeo with Maharaj as Party leader, Capildeo dismissed the executive. In response to this on 13 January 1964 three MPs, Montgomery Forrester, Peter Farquahar and Tajmool Hosein resigned from the party and formed the Liberal Party.

== Unrest in country and party ==
Independence left the two main industries, sugar and oil in the hands of foreign multi-national corporations (Tate & Lyle in sugar, Shell, British Petroleum and Texaco in oil). The labour unions interpreted this as evidence that the PNM and DLP leadership had sold out to foreign corporations. George Weekes, an anti-PNM Afro-Trinidadian trade unionist, gained control of the Oilfields Workers' Trade Union, while Krishna Gowandan challenged Bhadase Sagan Maraj's leadership of the All Trinidad Sugar Estates and Factory Workers Union. In March 1965, 15,000 sugar workers went on strike. Williams responded by declaring a state of emergency and suspending civil rights. This brought the Afro-Trinidadian and Tobagonian-dominated Trades Union Congress into alliance with the Indo-Trinidadian and Tobagonian-dominated sugar workers.

In response to labour unrest in 1965, the PNM government introduced the Industrial Stabilisation Act (ISA), which banned strike action in the public service and restricted the use of strikes and lock-outs in private industry. In the spirit of democratic socialism, Stephen Carpoondeo Maharaj instructed his MPs to vote against the bill. However, two members of the House of Representatives (Ashford Sastri Sinanan and Lionel Frank Seukeran), and all four Senators voted in favour of the bill. This led to a split in the party, with three separate wings vying for power. The centrist wing was led by Vernon Jamadar, the leftist wing by Stephen Carpoondeo Maharaj, and the conservative wing by Lionel Frank Seukaran and Ashford Sastri Sinanan. Maharaj, as Leader of the Opposition, attempted to remove the DLP Senators and replace them with leftists C.L.R. James, George Weekes (both Afro-Trinidadians), Adrian Cola Rienzi (an Indo-Trinidadian and former ally of T.U.B. Butler in the Labour riots of 1937), and Jack Kelshall (a white Trinidadian socialist and former advisor to Cheddi Jagan).

As Leader of the Opposition, Maharaj had the ability to appoint and dismiss Opposition Senators. In June, in response to the failure of the DLP Senators to oppose the ISA, Maharaj wrote the Governor General Sir Solomon Hochoy and asked him to revoke the appointment of the Senators and replace them with James, Rienzi and Clive Phil. Instead, based on the advice of the conservative wing of the party (which had the support of four MPs), Hochoy revoked Maharaj's appointment and replaced him with Simbhoonath Capildeo (Rudranath Capildeo's older brother).

Throughout all this Rudranath Capildeo remained party leader. He had selected Maharaj to be Leader of the Opposition and had opposed the ISA. However, rather than take a side in the dispute he remained vague, until he returned from England in July. Upon arrival he denounced Simbhoonath Capildeo as the main troublemaker in the party, and accused him of hiring a hit man to kill him. He met with Maharaj, James, Kelshall and Rienzi and promised to mobilise the DLP to oppose the ISA. The following day he denounced James, Maharaj and Rienzi of plotting against the interest of the party. He dismissed his brother as Leader of the Opposition and replaced him with Jamadar. In response to these actions, the DLP split again. Stephen Maharaj formed the Workers and Farmers Party (together with Weekes, James and a young Basdeo Panday), Simbhoonath Capildeo resigned from the DLP and joined the Liberal Party and Lionel Seukaran became an independent. This left the DLP and the Liberals each holding four seats, the WFP holding one, and Seukaran holding the other as an independent. Seukeran formed the Seukeran Independent Party (SIP) as a means of organizing his supporters.

The 1966 General Elections allowed the DLP to return to its position as the sole opposition party. The DLP won 12 of 36 seats. The WFP, SIP and the Liberal Party failed to win any seats. Rudranath Capildeo's continued absences led to his seat being declared vacant in 1967. When the DLP chose to boycott the by-election in protest, Bhadase Sagan Maraj was able to return to Parliament by winning the seat as an independent.

== "No-vote campaign" ==
In 1969, Vernon Jamadar was able to capture the party leadership from Capildeo. Following the Black Power riots and army mutiny in 1970, the DLP allied itself with former PNM Deputy Leader, A. N. R. Robinson, and his new movement, the Action Committee of Democratic Citizens (ACDC). When Williams called elections 6 months early, Robinson declared that he would not contest the election and called upon supporters to boycott the election. Despite reservations, the DLP ended up supporting Robinson in his "no vote" campaign.

Hoping to capitalize on the DLP's absence Bhadase Sagan Maraj formed the Democratic Liberation Party. Among the candidates fielded were Stephen Carpoondeo Maharaj, Lionel Frank Seukeran and Satnarayan Maharaj. The DLP in retaliation sent out their supporters to vote for their rival the People's National Movement, rather than see Maraj's party win. Thus, the Democratic Liberation Party failed to make headway against the DLP's "No-Vote" campaign and won no seats. Shortly after in the year, Bhadase Sagan Maraj died.

Thanks to the boycott, the PNM won all seats in the 1971 General Election. Many in the party felt betrayed by Robinson's actions, but the boycott resulted in a switch from voting machines to paper ballots.

== Demise of the party ==
Alloy Lequay ousted Jamadar as party leader in 1972. This led to Vernon Jamadar breaking off and forming the Social Democratic Labour Party of Trinidad and Tobago. The rump DLP then merged with the remnants of the Liberal Party and renamed itself the United Democratic Labour Party, now led by Simbhoonath Capildeo. Another faction led by Ashford Sinanan emerged and called itself the West Indian National Party (WINP). None of the successor parties won any seats in the 1976 General Elections. The new United Labour Front led by Basdeo Panday was able to totally displace the DLP from its core Indo-Trinidadian constituency. Jamadar and Lequay both contested the Siparia constituency (among eight candidates), but were soundly beaten by the ULF's Raffique Shah. That spelt the end of their political careers. Basdeo Panday later led the people who supported the party into the National Alliance for Reconstruction (which brought Indo-Trinidadians into power as part of a multi-racial coalition), then he finally led them into power as the dominant faction in the United National Congress government between 1995 and 2001, which won power again in 2010-2015 under Kamla Persad-Bissessar.

None of the principles of the DLP played a significant role in party politics after the demise of the party. Simboonath Capildeo and Vernon Jamadar returned to their respective legal practices. Satnarayan Maharaj took over control of the Sanatan Dharma Maha Sabha after the death of his father-in-law, Bhadase Sagan Maraj in 1971. Alloy Lequay went on to play a distinguished role as President and CEO of the Trinidad and Tobago Cricket Board, from which he retired in 2005.

== Political impact ==
The DLP originated from the merger of the People's Democratic Party (PDP), the Trinidad Labour Party (TLP) and the Party of Political Progress Groups (POPPG). The PDP was a liberal conservative business-mined, agrarian, and labour party of the Indo-Trinidadian middle and upper-middle class with a primarily Brahmin Hindu male leadership. The POPPG was a party of the white and near-white middle and upper-middle class, a small but economically powerful group. The Trinidad Labour Party was a working-class party, but had seen its support decline from 12% of the electorate in 1946 to 5% in 1956. Both the PDP and the POPPG had achieved electoral support by appealing to the Indo-Trinidadian and Afro-Trinidadian working classes, but the rise of the PNM split the Afro-Trinidadians away from the POPPG. By appealing to Sanatanist Hindus on religious and racial grounds, the DLP was able to entrench itself among Hindu Trinidadians, but the race-based appeal of the 1961 election campaign alienated the non-Indian middle class elements. Rudranath Capildeo's adoption of Democratic Socialism was an attempt to create a stronger link with the party's base, but it widened the rift with the middle class. By the early 1970s the party leadership was almost entirely Brahmin Hindu or Presbyterian Indian.

The DLP never held political power, limiting its impact on the overall direction of Trinidad and Tobago. In addition, unlike the PNM, which had a strong central leadership (in the person of Eric Williams), the DLP lacked a united leadership. The loss of the Gomes faction in 1963 and Farquahar, Forrester and Hosein in 1964 resulted in the loss of a section of the population which would remain unrepresented politically until the formation of the Organisation for National Reconstruction in 1981. Eric Williams had managed to attract much of the Muslim and Presbyterian portions of the Indo-Trinidadian population to the PNM. Even though these groups later drifted away from the PNM, Muslims remained an important constituency within the PNM until 1986.

Faced with the opportunity to expand the party through alliance with labour leaders, Rudranath Capildeo chose to steer the party away from this block. Rather than share power within the party with Afro-Trinidadians, Capildeo chose to remain permanently in Opposition. As the PNM moved away from racially threatening rhetoric, the DLP leadership was able to build a relationship with them. Many within the party accused the leadership of selling out the rank and file in exchange for political favours, but the purge of 1965 ensured that no-one remained in the party with enough personal support to be able to challenge the leadership.

The labour unrest of the 1960s and the Black Power movement of the early 1970s created other blocks of opposition to the PNM, but the DLP leadership was not able to attract these groups to their orbit. Instead, the opposition remained fragmented and disunited until the rise of the National Alliance for Reconstruction in 1986.

== Party leaders ==
- Victor Bryan - provisional leader (1957–1958)
- Bhadase Sagan Maraj - leader of the Parliamentary wing (1958–1960)
- Ashford Sastri Sinanan - Opposition Leader, Federal Parliament (1958–1961)
- Rudranath Capildeo - party leader (1960–1969)
- Albert Gomes - party leader (1963)
- Stephen Carpoondeo Maharaj - Opposition Leader (1963–1965)
- Simbhoonath Capildeo - Opposition Leader (1965)
- Vernon Jamadar - Opposition leader (1965–1972); party leader (1969–1972)
- Alloy Lequay - party leader (1972)

== See also ==
- Politics of Trinidad and Tobago
- Elections in Trinidad and Tobago
- George F. Fitzpatrick
