= Maraj =

Maraj, Maharaj, Marajh, Maharajh, Mahraj, Maragh, Maharagh, or Maradge is a Hindu Indian surname derived from the Sanskrit word Maharaja meaning "great leader", "great ruler", or "great king". Originally used as an honorific suffix to a Hindu priest's name, it became the surname of many Hindu priests who immigrated to different European colonies during the Indian indenture system and their descendants because when stating their names to the respective local colonial authorities they would state their whole name and many would include the honorific suffix of Maharaj, which the authorities erroneously documented as their surname. Notable individuals bearing the surname include:

- Badri Maharaj, an Indo-Fijian politician
- Bhadase Sagan Maraj (1919–1971), an Indo-Trinidadian politician, Hindu religious leader, founder of the Sanatan Dharma Maha Sabha, wrestler, author, and businessman
- Davan Maharaj, an Indo-Trinidadian American journalist and former editor-in-chief and publisher of the Los Angeles Times
- Devant Maharaj, an Indo-Trinidadian politician
- Ishwar Maraj (b. 1969), an Indo-Trinidadian member of the St Lucia cricket team
- Kama Maharaj, businessman and politician
- Keshav Maharaj (b. 1990), an Indo-South African cricketer
- Krishna Maharaj (1939–2024), a British Indo-Trinidadian businessman convicted of murder in South Florida
- Nicki Minaj (Onika Maraj) (b. 1982), a Trinidadian-born American rapper known professionally as Nicki Minaj
- Rabi Maharaj (b. 1947), a Trinidadian bestselling author
- Rajiv Maragh (b.1985), an Indo-Jamaican jockey
- Ralph Maraj (b. 1949), an Indo-Trinidadian politician, actor, playwright, and teacher
- Ramesh Maharaj, an Indo-Trinidadian politician and former Attorney General and Minister of Legal Affairs of Trinidad and Tobago
- Sadanand Maharaj, an Indo-Fijian politician (1876-1962)
- Satnarayan Maharaj (1931–2019), an Indo-Trinidadian Hindu religious leader, son-in-law of Bhadase Sagan Maraj, and Secretary-General of the Sanatan Dharma Maha Sabha
- Sathyandranath Ragunanan "Mac" Maharaj, (b. 1935) in Newcastle, Natal), a South African politician, academic and businessman.
- Valene Maharaj (b. 1986), an Indo-Trinidadian model, beauty pageant holder, former Miss Trinidad and Tobago, and former Miss Caribbean of the World
- William Maragh (b. 1963), a Jamaican deejay known professionally as Super Cat

== See also ==
- Persaud
- Rampersad
- Gobin
