= Father of the Country =

Father of the Country could mean:

- Pater Patriae or Father of the Nation, a Roman honorific
- Father of the Nation
- List of national founders
