= George Fitzpatrick =

Trinidad and Tobago politician

Right Honourable George F. Fitzpatrick
- Born: 1875; Port-of-Spain, Trinidad & Tobago
- Died: 1920 (aged 44–45)
- Occupation: Politician

George F. Fitzpatrick (1875–1920) was a prominent barrister of Indian descent and member of Trinidad & Tobago's Legislative Council. He played an early role in helping bring to light malpractices carried out under the system of Indian indentured labour. In 1909, George Fitzpatrick provided testimony before a British parliamentary investigation, led by Lord Sanderson, regarding alleged mistreatment of East Indian labourers living in Trinidad. The Sanderson Committee, however, failed to bring about the immediate abolition of the indentured system, only its postponement, which was further deferred by the onset of the First World War. It was not until 2 January 1920, that the system of indentured labour would come to an end. George F. Fitzpatrick's son, Hon. George Fitzpatrick, trained as a solicitor and served a three-year term as member of parliament, representing the district of San Fernando. Following the death of his first wife during childbirth, Hon. George Fitzpatrick married Phyllis Sinanan, sister of Mitra and Ashford Sinanan, uniting the Fitzpatrick family with another prominent political family of Trinidad (see Ashford Sinanan, Ambassador, Leader of the Opposition, Democratic Labour Party (DLP), West Indies Federation, founder of the West Indian National Party (WINP) and High Commissioner to India. See also M. Sinanan, Constitution Commission of Trinidad and Tobago, presented to His Excellency Sir Ellis Clarke, Commander-in-Chief of Trinidad and Tobago, 22 January 1974.
