= Social Democratic Labour Party =

Social Democratic Labour Party may refer to:

- Estonian Social Democratic Labour Party, merged into the Estonian United Left Party
- Social Democratic Labour Party of Lithuania, LDDP
- Social Democratic Workers' Party (Netherlands)
- Social Democratic and Labour Party, Northern Ireland
- Russian Social Democratic Labour Party
- Social Democratic Labour Party of Trinidad and Tobago
- Swedish Social Democratic Party, (Swedish: Sveriges socialdemokratiska arbetareparti, SAP; literally, "Social Democratic Labour Party of Sweden")

== See also ==
- Social Democratic Party
