= Saint Augustine, Trinidad and Tobago =

Saint Augustine
- Town
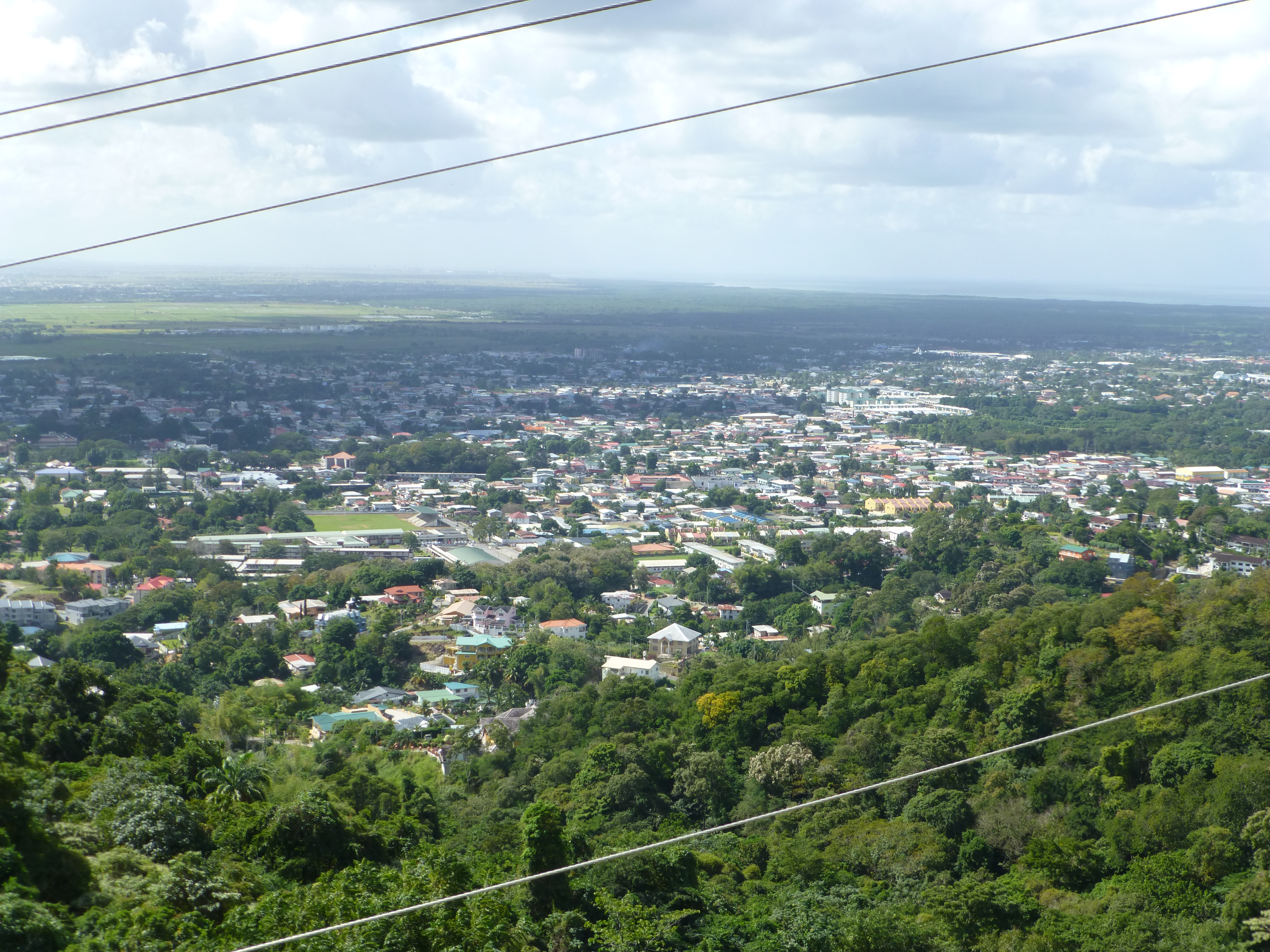
- St. Augustine

- Location within Trinidad and Tobago
- Coordinates: 10°38′45″N 61°23′58″W
- Country: Trinidad and Tobago
- Region: Tunapuna–Piarco
- Named for: St. Augustine of Hippo

Population (2011)
  - Total: 4,844
- Ranked
- Time zone: UTC−4 (AST)

Saint Augustine is a university town in the northwest of Trinidad, Trinidad and Tobago.

== Town ==
It is the site of the University of the West Indies at St. Augustine (UWI-STA). In the 2019-2020 school year, there were 16,571 students enrolled in the university, making college students a vital part of the town's economy. Many houses in the general university area have been converted to students' accommodation, but due to the lack of fee regulation, they are generally more than double the cost of university housing. Four of the five halls of residence provided by the University are located here, namely St. John's Hall, Freedom Hall (previously named Milner Hall), Canada Hall, and Trinity Hall.

The town comprises many different communities like St John, St Michael Village, Mt St Benedict(all of these to the north of eastern main road), as well as the surrounding area of UWI, Monte Grande east of the campus and Morang village, south of the campus on the highway.

St. John's Road in St. Augustine is the main access road for Mount St. Benedict, one of the notable historic sites in Trinidad and Tobago. On the mount, one can find a Catholic Church along with a monastery and a factory where yogurt is made. On this road, there is also the St. John the Baptist Roman Catholic Church. The church is opposite to a Community Centre, which underwent renovations and now houses a new field for the residents to engage in football, one of the more popular sports of this area.

St. Augustine is also home to the Hugh Wooding Law School, a prestigious law school which attracts many inter-island students of the Caribbean and beyond. Further educational establishments include St. Augustine Girls' High School and Lakshmi Girls' Hindu College. In close proximity to the law school is the Seismic Research Center, which is the official source of information on earthquakes and volcanoes in the English-speaking Caribbean. It is the headquarters of the Sanatan Dharma Maha Sabha.

== Notable persons ==
- Ian McDonald (born 1933), writer

== Gallery ==
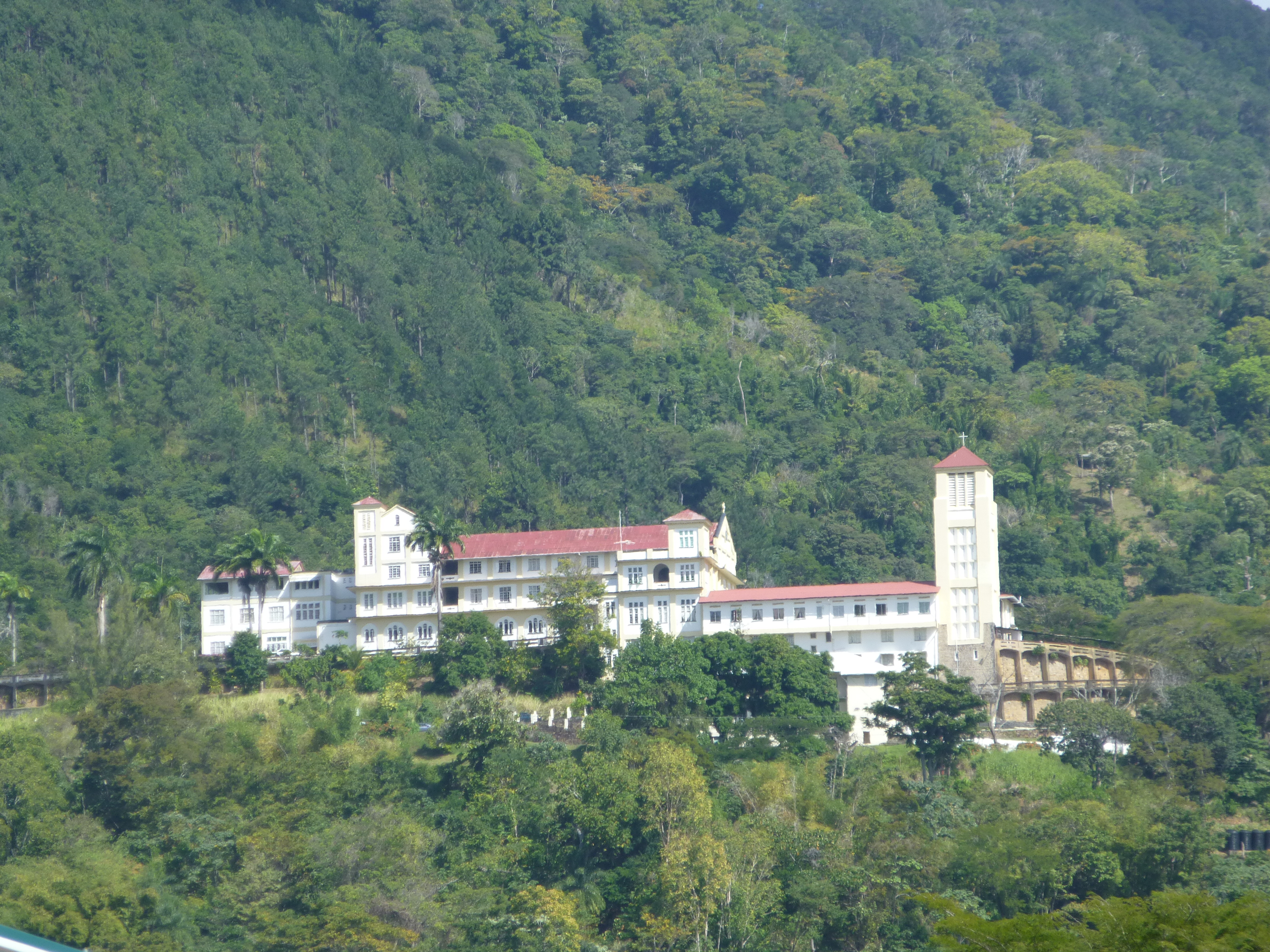
Mount St. Benedict

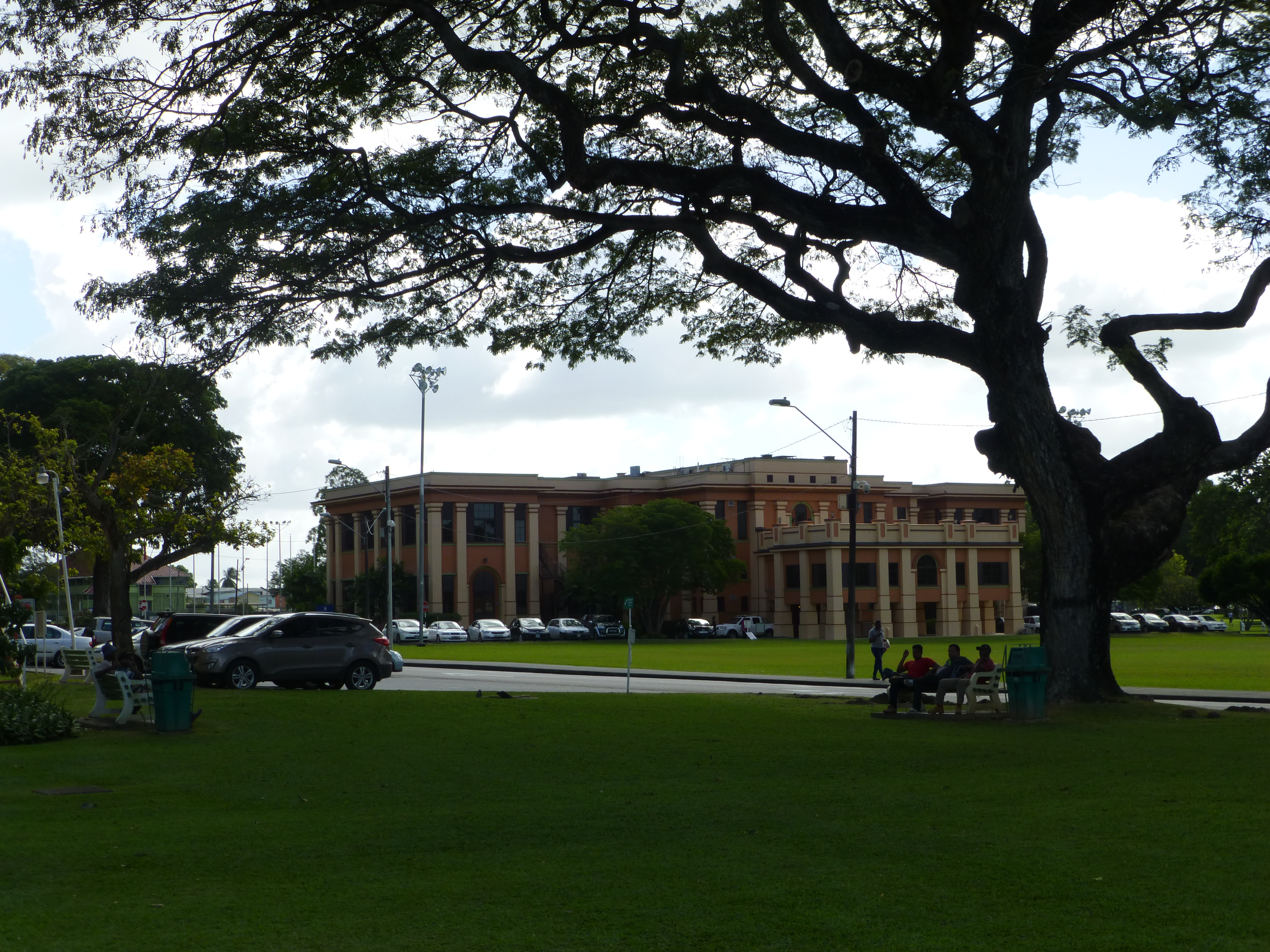
UWI Campus
