= 1956 Trinidad and Tobago general election =

- 24 September 1956

All 24 seats in the Legislative Council
- Turnout: 80.09% (▲9.96pp)
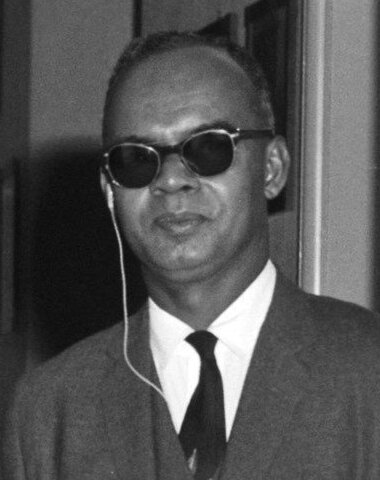

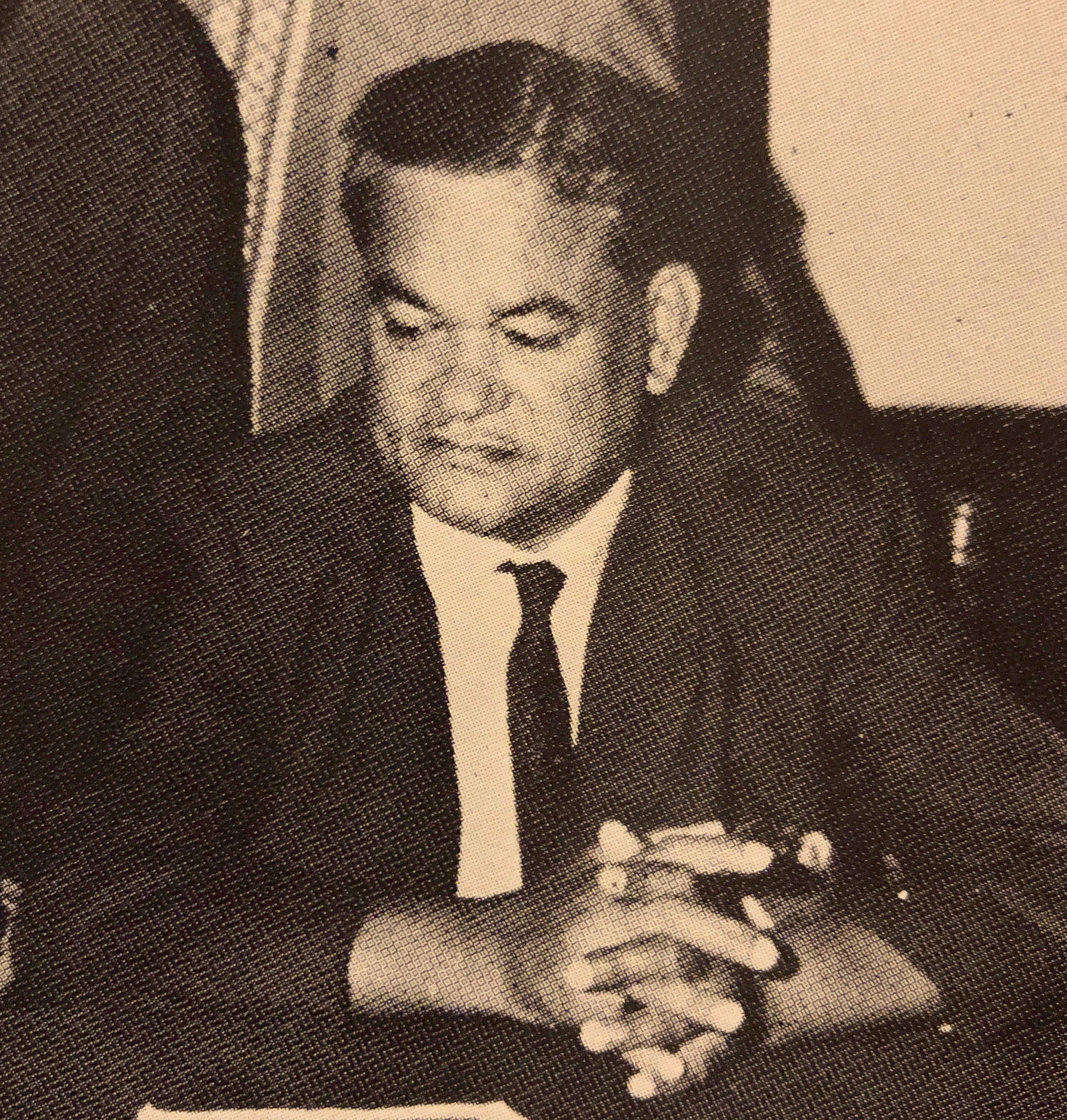
	First party	Second party
Leader	Eric Williams	Bhadase Sagan Maraj
Party	PNM	PDP
Leader since	1955	1953
Seats won	13	5
Percentage	39.75%	20.85%
	Third party	Fourth party
Leader	Tubal Uriah Butler	A. P. T. James
Party	Butler Party	TLP–NDP
Leader since	1936
Last election	6	2
Seats won	2	2
Percentage	11.75%	5.18%
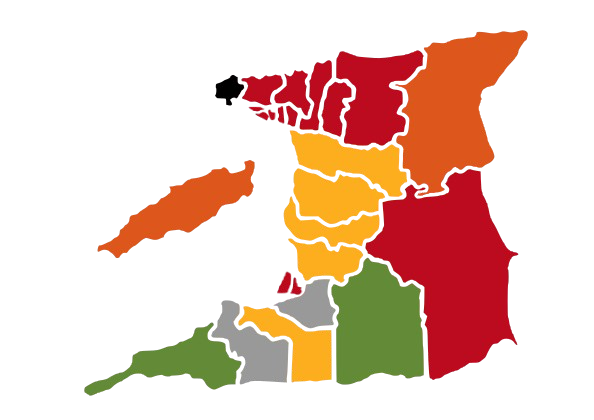
Chief Minister before election
Albert Gomes
(Party of Political Progress Groups)
Subsequent Chief Minister
Eric Williams
(People's National Movement)

General elections were held in Trinidad and Tobago on 24 September 1956. 129 candidates from nine political parties contested for 24 seats in the legislative council. The result was a victory for the People's National Movement, which won 13 of the 24 seats. Voter turnout was 80.1%.

In one of the biggest races in the 1956 general election, West Indies cricketer Learie Constantine of the PNM defeated Radio Trinidad announcer Surujpat Mathura of the PDP in Tunapuna.

== Results ==
Party	Votes	%	Seats	+/–
People's National Movement	105,153	39.75	13	New
People's Democratic Party	55,148	20.85	5	New
Butler Party	31,071	11.75	2	–4
Party of Political Progress Groups	14,019	5.30	0	–2
Trinidad Labour Party–National Development Party	13,692	5.18	2	0
Caribbean National Labour Party	3,864	1.46	0	New
Caribbean People's Democratic Party	627	0.24	0	New
West Indian Independence Party	446	0.17	0	New
Independents	40,523	15.32	2	–4
Total	264,543	100.00	24	+6
Valid votes	264,543	97.43		
Invalid/blank votes	6,991	2.57		
Total votes	271,534	100.00		
Registered voters/turnout	339,028	80.09		
Source: Elections and Boundaries Commission
