= Simbhoonath Capildeo =

Trinidadian and Trobagonian lawyer and politician (1914–1990)

The Right Honourable Simbhoonath Capildeo CM
- Capildeo in 1935

Secretary General of the Sanatan Dharma Maha Sabha
- In office 1952–1977
- Dharmacharya: Pt. Jankie Persad Sharma
- President General: Bhadase Sagan Maraj; Rampersad Bholai
- Preceded by: Ram Suratsingh
- Succeeded by: Satnarayan Maharaj

Personal details
- Born: 1914 Chaguanas, Caroni County, Trinidad and Tobago
- Died: 1990 (aged 75–76)
- Party: United Democratic Labour Party (1972-1976)
- Other political affiliations: United Front (1946); Democratic Labour Party (1957-1965); Liberal Party (1965-1972)
- Relatives: Capildeo family
- Occupation: Lawyer; Politician
- Awards: Chaconia Medal (1989)

Simbhoonath Capildeo (Note: pronounced [siⁿbʰunɑːt̪ʰə kəpiləd̪eːoː]) CM (1914–1990) was a prominent lawyer and politician in Trinidad and Tobago. He was the elder brother of Rudranath Capildeo and uncle of Nobel laureate Sir Vidia "V. S." Naipaul and Shiva Naipaul. He was father to two sons, Surendranath and Devendranath Capildeo and a daughter, Sita Capildeo. Capildeo was one of the founding members of the Democratic Labour Party and a member of parliament from 1956 to 1966, becoming known as "the Lion of the Legislative Council". He served as the acting Leader of the Opposition for Bhadase Sagan Maraj and Rudranath Capildeo. Capildeo was also an important leader of the Hindu community in Trinidad and played in role in the foundation of the Sanatan Dharma Maha Sabha. In 1989, he was awarded the Chaconia Gold Medal by the Trinidad and Tobago government, honoring his service to the country.

His father, Pundit Capildeo Dubey, an immigrant from the village of Mahadeva Dubey, Somra, Gorakhpur, Uttar Pradesh, India, built Anand Bhavan (the "Lion House") on the Main Road in Chaguanas. The Lion House is arguably the most famous architectural icon representing the Indian heritage of Trinidad and Tobago. Pundit died on a trip to India in 1926, leaving Simbhoonath in the role of family patriarch at the age of 12. His mother, Soogee Capildeo, guided him, but Simbhoonath was an autodidact. His nephew, V.S. Naipaul, wrote about Simbhoonath's love for books in The Mystic Masseur. In his 9-line biographical sketch in the Indian Centenary Review (1845–1945) his hobby is listed as "Reading".

Capildeo studied Hindustani and Sanskrit and became a local expert on Hinduism, and he also explored the philosophers of Western Civilization. He rapidly assumed intellectual leadership of the local Hindu society and in 1928 began creating the modern formal structure of Hindu society in Trinidad and Tobago. He was also the Secretary General of the Sanatan Dharma Maha Sabha, preceding Satnarayan Maharaj.

Simbhoonath was married to Indradai Capildeo (née Ramoutar) and was the father of one daughter, Sita, born in 1936, and two sons: Devendranath, born in 1938, and Surendranath, born in 1940. Surendranath, also a lawyer, was the only child who followed his father into local politics: he served as a senator of the United National Congress (UNC) party in the early 1990s.

== See also ==
- Capildeo family
