= Rudranath Capildeo =

Trinidadian and Tobagonian politician, mathematician and barrister (1920–1970)

The Honourable Rudranath Capildeo TC
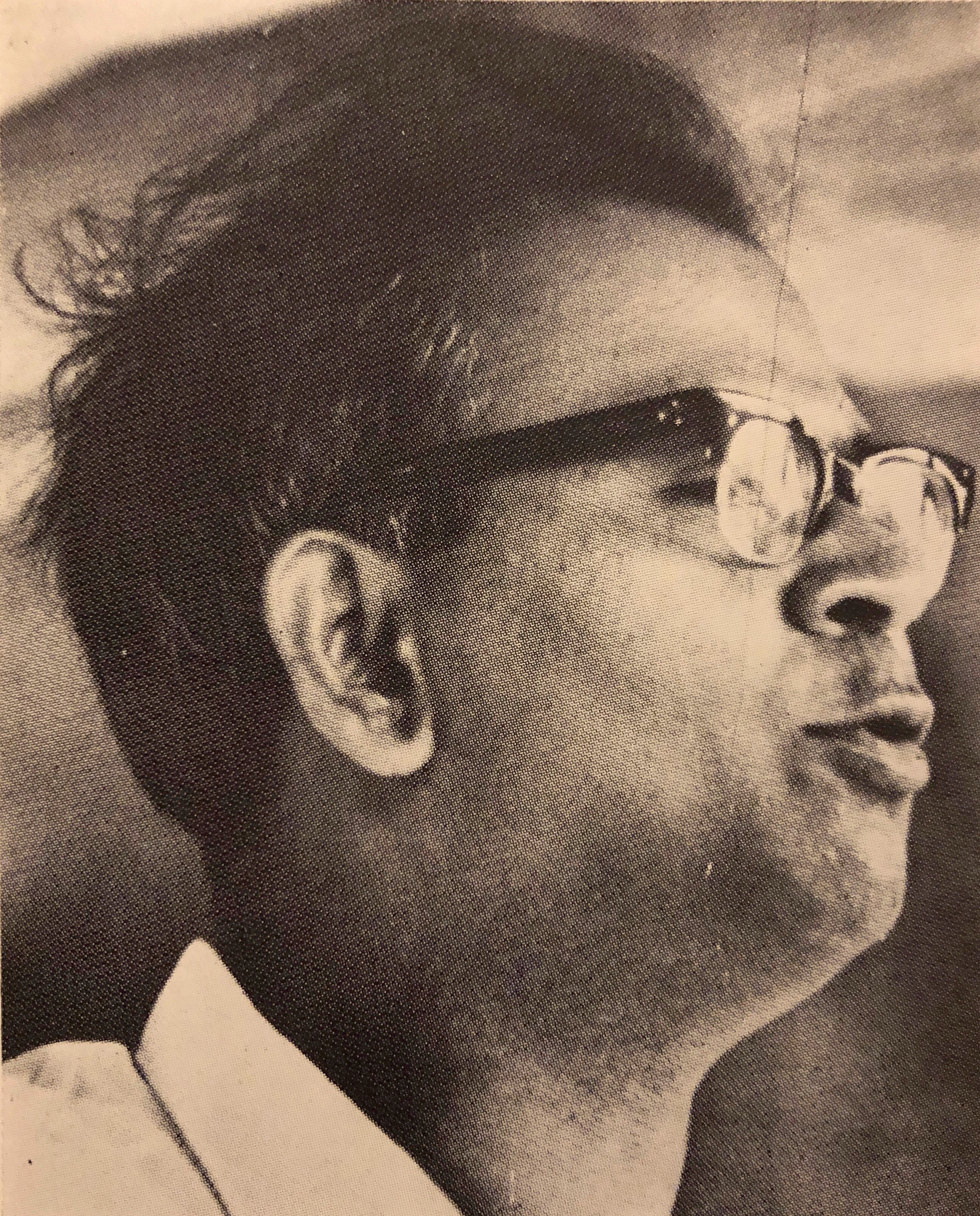

1st Leader of the Opposition of Trinidad and Tobago
- In office 31 August 1962 – June 1967
- Monarch: Elizabeth II
- Governor General: Solomon Hochoy
- Prime Minister: Eric Williams
- Acting on his behalf: Ashford Sastri Sinanan (1962); Stephen Carpoondeo Maharaj (1963–1965); Simbhoonath Capildeo (1965); Vernon Jamadar (1965–1967)
- Preceded by: de jure Bhadase Sagan Maraj (as Leader of the Opposition of British Trinidad and Tobago) de facto Simbhoonath Capildeo (as acting Opposition Leader)
- Succeeded by: Vernon Jamadar

Member of Parliament for Saint Augustine
- In office 29 December 1961 – 25 August 1966
- Succeeded by: John Bharath

Member of Parliament for Chaguanas
- In office 25 November 1966 – December 1967
- Preceded by: Tajmool Hosein
- Succeeded by: Bhadase Sagan Maraj

Leader of the Democratic Labour Party
- In office 1960–1963
- Preceded by: Bhadase Sagan Maraj
- Succeeded by: Albert Gomes
- In office 1963–1969
- Preceded by: Albert Gomes
- Succeeded by: Vernon Jamadar

Personal details
- Born: 2 February 1920 Chaguanas, Caroni County, Trinidad and Tobago
- Died: 12 May 1970 (aged 50) England
- Party: Democratic Labour Party
- Spouse(s): Ruth Goodchild; Shirley Anne Gasteen
- Children: 2
- Relatives: Capildeo family
- Education: Queen's Royal College
- Alma mater: University of London (BS, MS, PhD)
- Occupation: Politician; mathematical physicist; barrister
- Awards: Trinity Cross (1969)

Rudranath Capildeo (Note: pronounced [rud̪rənɑːt̪ʰə kəpiləd̪eːoː]) TC (2 February 1920 – 12 May 1970), often stylised as R. N. Capildeo, was a Trinidadian and Tobagonian politician, mathematician and barrister. He was a member of the prominent Hindu Indo-Trinidadian Capildeo family. Capildeo was the leader of the Democratic Labour Party (DLP) from 1960 to 1969 and the first Leader of the Opposition in the Parliament of the independent Trinidad and Tobago from 1962 to 1967. He was also a faculty member at the University of London, eventually holding the position of Reader of Mathematics. He was awarded the Trinity Cross, the nation's highest award, in 1969.

== Early years and education ==
A young Capildeo (third from the left on the bottom row) with his mother and siblings.

Rudranath Capildeo was born on 2 February 1920 into a Brahmin Hindu Indo-Trinidadian family at Anand Bhavan (translation: Mansion of Eternal Bliss; aka Lion House) on the Main Road in the city of Chaguanas in Caroni County in the then British-ruled Trinidad and Tobago. His father was Pundit Capil Deo Dubey, an indentured laborer who emigrated from Mahadeva Dubey Village, Gorakhpur district, North-Western Provinces, British India (present-day Mahadeva Dubey, Maharajganj district, Gorakhpur division, Uttar Pradesh, India) in 1894, and his mother was Soogee Capildeo (née Gobin). Capildeo was the youngest child of the prominent Capildeo family. He was educated at Queen's Royal College in Port of Spain where he won an island scholarship in 1938. He attended the University of London where he obtained his BSc in Mathematics and Physics in 1943, his MSc in Mathematics in 1945, and his PhD in Mathematical Physics in 1948, his thesis being entitled "The flexure problem in elasticity".

== Career ==
Capildeo held lectureships at the University of London, including at both University College London and at Westfield College. He also taught briefly at Queen's Royal College (1945) and was Principal of the Polytechnic Institute in Port of Spain in 1959.

Capildeo's entry into politics in the late 1950s was because the political figures who entered the DLP in 1957 did not trust each other, and could only agree on him. Though he left Trinidad in 1939 to study medicine, he changed his course of study, focusing on applied mathematics and physics. He was committed to understanding the nature of space and time, and this sparked his interest in understanding Einstein's Theory of Special Relativity. This work led to several new theories, which had practical implications in aerodynamics and space. They included "The Flexure Problem in Elasticity" (Ph.D. thesis) and his study on the "Theory of Rotation and Gravity" named Capildeo's Theory, which had applications in early outer-space expeditions in the 1960s and 1970s.

His political career was unusual, since he was active only during election campaigns (in 1961 and 1967) and during the summer months. His conduct of the last pre-independence electoral campaign, in 1961, was also unusual, beginning with his declaration that because he understood Einstein he could "compress the time" necessary to undo what the sitting government had done. Not only did Capildeo produce many significant mathematical theories and a book on Vector Algebra and Mechanics in 1967, he also studied law in London in 1956. Two years later he was admitted to practice as a barrister-at-law in Trinidad. He founded and led the Democratic Labour Party (DLP) in 1960, and became Leader of the Opposition in the Trinidad & Tobago Parliament (1960–67). With Eric Williams as Prime Minister, both men laid the foundation for an independent Trinidad and Tobago.

Capildeo was also responsible for having the freedom of worship included in the Constitution of Trinidad and Tobago and Service Commissions because he felt that service commissions would ensure equality and fairness in the appointment of people to public office.

The Rudranath Capildeo Learning Resource Centre (RCLRC) is located in McBean Village, Couva, Trinidad.

== Personal life ==
He was married to Ruth Goodchild in 1944 and they had one son named Rudy Capildeo. He also has a daughter, Anne Saraswati Gasteen Capildeo, who was born in 1959.

He was the younger brother of Simbhoonath Capildeo, brother-in-law of Seepersad Naipaul, uncle of Nobel Prize-winning author V.S. Naipaul, Shiva Naipaul, and Surendranath Capildeo, uncle-in-law of Nadira Naipaul, and grand uncle of Vahni Capildeo and Neil Bissoondath.
