= Bhadase Sagan Maraj =

Trinidadian and Tobagonian Hindu leader and politician (1920–1971)

The Right Honourable Bhadase Sagan Maraj
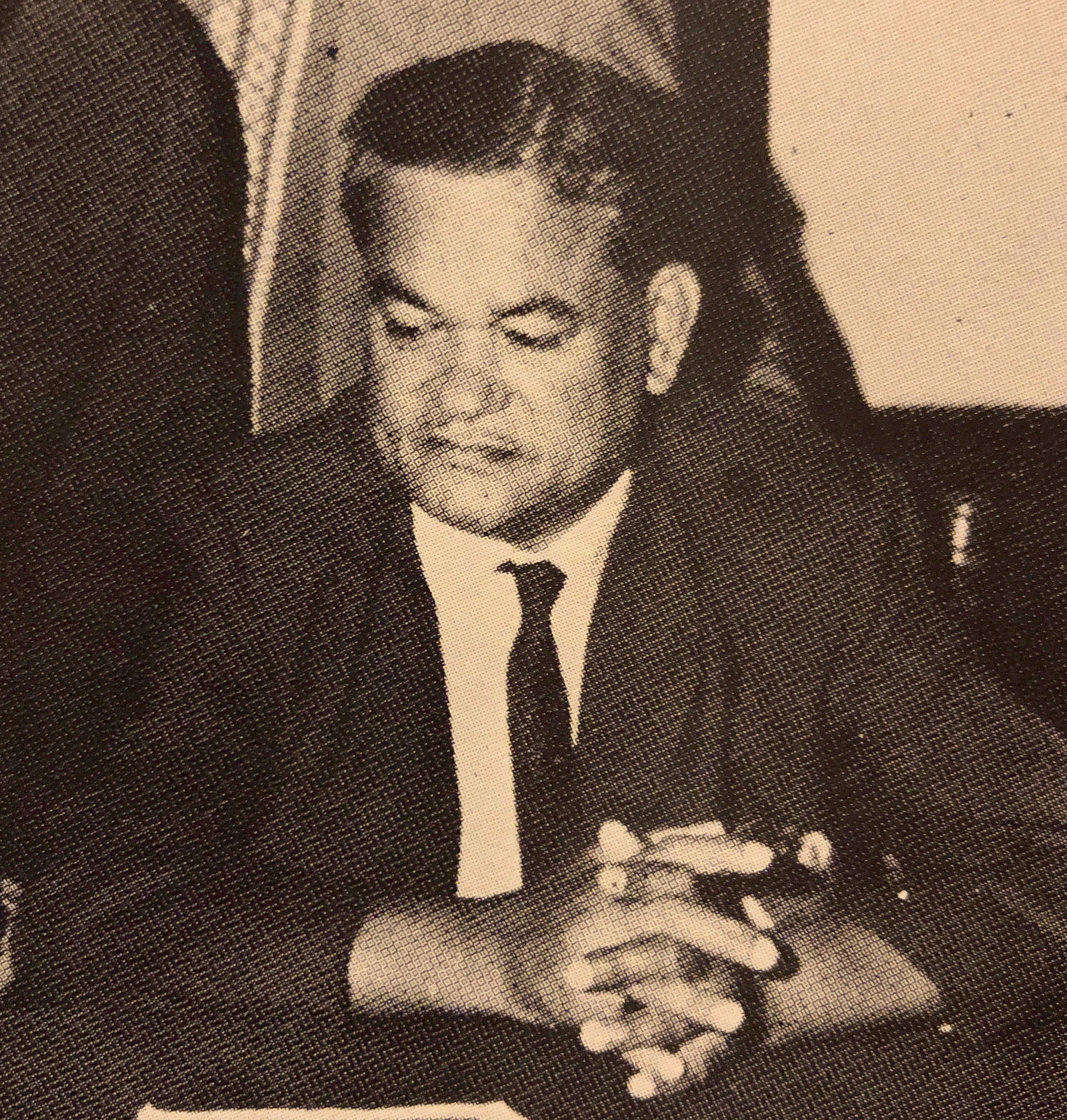

2nd Leader of the Opposition of Trinidad and Tobago
- In office 26 October 1956 – 21 September 1961
- Monarch: Elizabeth II
- Governor: Solomon Hochoy; Edward Beetham
- Chief Minister & Premier: Eric Williams
- Acting on his behalf: A. P. T. James (1959); Simbhoonath Capildeo (1959–1961)
- Preceded by: Ashford Sastri Sinanan
- Succeeded by: Rudranath Capildeo (as Leader of the Opposition of the Dominion of Trinidad and Tobago)

Member of Parliament for Chaguanas
- In office 1968–1971
- Preceded by: Rudranath Capildeo
- Succeeded by: Balraj Deosarran

Member of the Legislative Council for Caroni North
- In office 26 October 1956 – 21 September 1961
- Preceded by: Mitra Sinanan

Member of the Legislative Council for Tunapuna
- In office 1950–1956
- Succeeded by: Learie Constantine

1st Political Leader of the Democratic Liberation Party
- In office 1971–1971
- Preceded by: Inaugural holder
- Succeeded by: None (party dissolved)

1st Political Leader of the Democratic Labour Party
- In office 1957–1960
- Preceded by: Himself as Political Leader of the People's Democratic Party
- Succeeded by: Rudranath Capildeo

1st Political Leader of the People's Democratic Party
- In office 1953–1957
- Preceded by: Inaugural holder
- Succeeded by: Himself as Political Leader of the Democratic Labour Party

1st President General of the Sanatan Dharma Maha Sabha
- In office 1952–1971
- Dharmacharya: Pt. Jankie Persad Sharma (1955–1971); Pt. Basdeo Misir (1952–1955)
- Succeeded by: Rampersad Bholai

3rd President General of the All Trinidad Sugar Estates and Factory Workers Union
- In office 1957–1971
- Preceded by: McDonald Moses
- Succeeded by: Krishna Gowandan

1st President General of the Federation of Unions of Sugar Workers and Cane Farmers
- In office 1953–1957
- Succeeded by: Himself as the 3rd President General of ATSEFWU after FUSWCF merged into ATSEFWU

Personal details
- Born: Bhadase Sagan Maraj; 29 February 1920 Caroni Village, Caroni County, Trinidad and Tobago
- Died: 21 October 1971 (aged 51) Port of Spain, Saint George County, Trinidad and Tobago
- Cause of death: Side effects of Pethidine
- Party: Democratic Liberation Party (1971)
- Other political affiliations: Independent (1950–1953; 1961–1971); Democratic Labour Party (1957–1961) West Indies Democratic Labour Party (1957–1961); People's Democratic Party (1953–1957)
- Spouse(s): Vijanti Maraj (ann.); Hilda Chinibas; Rachel Chinibas
- Relatives: Satnarayan Maharaj (son-in-law)
- Education: Pamphylian High School Tunapuna
- Occupation: Politician; religious leader; businessman; wrestler; writer
- Nickname(s): Baba; Big Bhadase; Lion of Trinidad

Personal life
- Notable work(s): Hostile and Recalcitrant

Religious life
- Religion: Hinduism
- Founder of: Sanatan Dharma Maha Sabha
- Sect: Sanātanī

Religious career
- Teacher: Pt. Basdeo Misir

Bhadase Sagan Maraj (Note: pronounced [bʰəd̪eːsə səɡənə mərəɟə]) (29 February 1920 – 21 October 1971) was a Trinidad and Tobago politician, Hindu leader, civil rights activist, trade unionist, landowner, businessman, philanthropist, and wrestler. He founded the Sanatan Dharma Maha Sabha in 1952, which grew to be the largest and most influential Hindu organization in Trinidad and Tobago and the wider Caribbean. He also founded the Caroni East Indian Association, the People's Democratic Party, the Democratic Labour Party, the Democratic Liberation Party, the Federation of Unions of Sugar Workers and Cane Farmers, and The Bomb newspaper.

== Early life ==
Bhadase Sagan Maraj was born on 29 February 1920 into a Brahmin Hindu Indo-Trinidadian family who lived on Sagan Street in Caroni Village in the county of Caroni in central Trinidad in British-ruled Trinidad and Tobago. His parents were Baboonie and Mathew Sagan Maraj. His mother Baboonie was the daughter of Parmesar Maharaj. His father, Mathew Sagan Maraj, was a devout Hindu, a mukhiya (village head), and a leader in the Hindu and Indian community of central Trinidad. Maraj's paternal grandparents were Jasoda and Ramsubhag Misir, who were from the village of Chateya in Basti district in the then North-Western Provinces in the Awadh and Bhojpuri regions of the Hindi Belt in North India (in present-day Uttar Pradesh, India). In Calcutta they were tricked into indentureship and brought to Trinidad abroad the ship Rhine. When Maraj was thirteen years old his father had been shot and killed by a gang while he was on his hammock on the porch of his home reading the Bhagawad Gita. His uncle was also killed when a gang had tied him to a stone and threw him into the Caroni River. After his father's death, Maraj went to live with his aaji (paternal grandmother). Many attempts were made on Maraj's life, so he took up wrestling and by the age of twenty he became an accomplished wrestler. He had attended the Caroni Canadian Mission School and the Pamphylian High School in Tunapuna.

Maraj started off digging sand for construction purposes in the Caroni River.

This was only the beginning, for soon the young Maraj had bought a truck and was in the transport business. The advent of the Second World War and the arrival of the United States Armed Forces in the British colony threw Maraj into the big league.

He was one of the biggest contractors on the American naval base at Chaguaramas and when the order came for the Americans to pull out their task force from that country, Maraj was able to buy out large areas of the base that were being deactivated. Maraj was not yet 30 when he counted his first million dollars. When Maraj was elected to the Legislative Council in 1950 there was no Sanatan Dharma Maha Sabha. Hindu schools were only a dream and illiteracy among Hindus was about 50%.

Maraj's guru was Pundit Basdeo Misir.

== Civil society activism ==
In early 1952, the Sanatan Dharma Maha Sabha was formed and this organisation was given permission to build and operate their own schools and Bhadase declared "By September, we will have six: schools." The cynics laughed because Maha Sabha did not even have a plan for a school but September saw the establishment of six Hindu Schools.

Hindu schools were mushrooming everywhere to the charge that Bhadase was building cowshed schools, which were unhealthy and physically unfit for children to be educated, he declared, "It is better to have a child receive an education in a cowshed than none at all". The then government arranged to assist and fund the building and operations of Hindu and other religious schools in Trinidad and Tobago.

== Politics ==
He was elected to the Legislative Council in 1950, founded the People's Democratic Party in 1953, and later merged it into the Democratic Labour Party in 1957, which he led between 1957 and 1960 (when he lost control of the party to Rudranath Capildeo). Bhadase (as he was most widely known) continued to be active in politics until his death, often opposing Capildeo and other members of the DLP. After Capildeo's Chaguanas seat was declared vacant in 1967 Bhadase won the seat in a by-election boycotted by the DLP.

In 1958 Bhadase Maraj won the Federal Election with his newly formed Democratic Labour Party. He also led a sugar union, All Trinidad. However, Bhadase soon succumbed to ill health. The strenuous battle of the 1958 Federal Election had by then taken its toll. In 1959, the cry was soon heard, "Bhadase is dying."

Bhadase was able to survive this first bout of illness but he was never again the same driving and dynamic Hindu force. And when he finally died on 21 October 1971 the headlines said, "Will the Maha Sabha Survive Bhadase?"

When the DLP boycotted the 1971 general elections Bhadase organised the Democratic Liberation Party to contest 21 seats in the election. He ran for the Oropouche constituency against George Williams of the PNM. However, all of his party's candidates, including himself, were defeated when the DLP leadership brought out their supporters to vote for the People's National Movement candidates rather than see Bhadase's party win. However, his party did receive close to 15,000 votes and 12.61% percent of the national vote. He died several months after the election. His son-in-law, Satnarayan Maharaj succeeded him as the de facto leader of the Sanatan Dharma Maha Sabha.

== Personal life ==
Bhadase Maraj was first married at the age of fifteen to Vijanti Maraj, however the marriage did not last long because her father took her back home fearing for her life due to the constant threat on Bhadase Maraj's life. Maraj was later married to Hilda Chinibas and Rachel Chinibas who were sisters. He had a total of nine children: six with Hilda and three with Rachel, whom he spent his latter years with till he died. His daughter Shanti Maharaj was married to Satnarayan Maharaj, who went on to succeed him as the de facto leader of the Sanatan Dharma Maha Sabha. After Satnarayan Maharaj's death in November 2019, Vijay Maharaj, who was the son of Satnarayan Maharaj and grandson of Bhadase, took over as the acting leader of the Sanatan Dharma Maha Sabha.

== Legacy ==
Today after his death, the Maha Sabha to which he devoted so much of his life and personal wealth still lives on trying to provide the Hindu leadership which Maraj gave them during the nineteen-fifties. The greatest obituary to Big Bhadase came from Augustus Ramrekersingh who wrote in the Trinidad Express on 21 October 1971 "More than any other single individual, Bhadase made the Indians proud of their heritage in a society which was Christian and Afro-Saxon, hence hostile to them." The Shri Bhadase Sagan Maraj Lakshmi Girls' Hindu College is named after him.
