= TV Jaagriti =

Hindu religious television channel

- Country: Trinidad and Tobago
- Broadcast area: Nationwide
- Affiliates: Radio Jaagriti 102.7 FM
- Headquarters: Tunapuna, Tunapuna–Piarco, Trinidad and Tobago

Programming
- Languages: Trinidadian and Tobagonian English, Trinidadian Hindustani, Modern Standard Hindi, Sanskrit
- Picture format: HDTV 720p

Ownership
- Owner: Sanatan Dharma Maha Sabha
- Parent: Central Broadcasting Services Limited
- Key people: Vijay Maharaj (managing director)

History
- Launched: February 2015
- Founder: Satnarayan Maharaj

Links
- Website: sdmsjaagriti.com

Availability

Streaming media
- YouTube: Central Broadcasting Services
- Facebook: Radio & TV Jaagriti
- Tego TV: TV Jaagriti

YouTube information
- Channel: Central Broadcasting Services
- Years active: 3 months
- Genres: religious • lifestyle • health and wellness • news • politics
- Views: 30,880
- Last updated: October 2026

TV Jaagriti is a Trinidadian and Tobagonian Hindu religious television channel, that is operated by the Central Broadcasting Services Limited, which is owned by the Sanatan Dharma Maha Sabha, a major Hindu organization in Trinidad and Tobago. It airs programming related to the Indian Hindus in Trinidad and Tobago such as religious, cultural, news, lifestyle, health, youth and political programs.

== See also ==
- Hinduism in Trinidad and Tobago
- Indo-Trinidadian and Tobagonian
- Sanatan Dharma Maha Sabha
- Radio Jaagriti 102.7 FM
- Indian Caribbean Museum of Trinidad and Tobago
- Indo-Caribbean
- Hinduism in the West Indies
