= Quintin O'Connor =

Trinidadian politician (1908–1958)

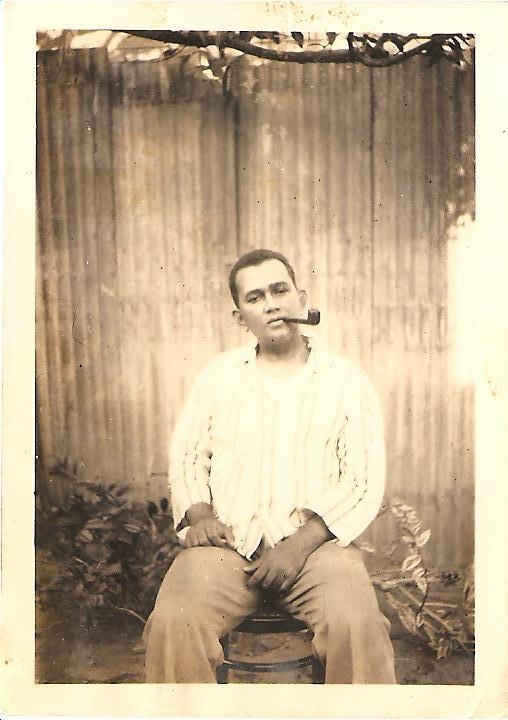
- O'Connor aged 31 smoking his pipe
- Born: 31 October 1908; Port of Spain, Trinidad
- Died: 3 November 1958 (aged 50); Port of Spain, Trinidad
- Occupations: Union leader, politician, activist
- Spouse: Lucy Daphne Piper-O'Connor
- Children: Rosalind, Robert, Thomas and Edwin (Anthony)
- Parent(s): Virginia and Henry O'Connor

Quintin O'Connor (31 October 1908 – 3 November 1958) was a union leader, activist, and politician in colonial Trinidad and Tobago from the 1930s to the late 1950s. He played an essential role in the institutionalization of unionism in Trinidad and was an early proponent of Trinidadian independence.

== Personal life ==
Quintin O'Connor was born on 31 October 1908 in Port of Spain, Trinidad, to Virginia and Henry O'Connor. Virginia was a homemaker and Henry was the manager of a firm of cocoa merchants. They had five children besides Quintin: Lucy, Phillip, Juan, Patrick and Willie. Along with his brothers, Quintin was among a small number of young men in Trinidad whose families could afford to provide them with a secondary education. He attended school at Saint Mary's College, though he left school without obtaining the Junior Cambridge Certificate.

O'Connor married Lucy Daphne Piper on 31 July 1943. During their 15-year marriage, they had four children.

== Union career ==
O'Connor, as a member of the Clerks' section of the Trinidad Labour Party (TLP), attempted on numerous occasions prior to the riots of 1937 to pass a motion permitting his union to register under the Trade Union Ordinance of 1933, but each and every motion was defeated. He was opposed within the party by TLP leader A. A. Cipriani, who, in addition to believing that the 1933 Ordinance did not provide sufficient protection to union organizers, preferred agitation for political reform within the colony's Legislative Council to union activities, such as strikes and street protests. Following the riots, however, O'Connor led a group of clerks who broke from the TLP to form the Union of Shop Assistants and Clerks (USAC), which was officially registered on 30 August 1938. In 1939, O'Connor and other leaders of the USAC, organized the mainly female workers at the Renown shirt factory and won for them a 12.5 per cent wage increase, and an eight-hour workday among other concessions.

In 1940, O'Connor incorporated the USAC into the Federated Workers Trade Union (FWTU), which he took over with Albert Gomes. Though originally intent on exclusively organizing clerks, O'Connor and Gomes met with little success and decided to turn the FWTU into an omnibus union. They regularly received advice from the British Trades Union Congress (TUC). When the United States established a naval base in the Chaguaramas area, they secretly organized the base workers and eventually won recognition as the bargaining agents for the base employees. They also organized many government workers. In 1946, on behalf of government workers, they signed the FWTU's first collective bargaining agreement. This agreement was historic because, for the first time in Trinidad's history, wage increases were linked to increases in the cost of living index. In addition, the agreement was a sign from the government to other employers that collective bargaining was to become a normal part of labour relations in Trinidad.

In 1948, O'Connor became the secretary of the Trinidad and Tobago Trades Union Congress (TTTUC), which briefly united the labour movement in Trinidad and Tobago and was able to enter into block agreements with employers. However, the TTTUC split up shortly after over the issue of international affiliation with the World Federation of Trade Unions (WFTU).

As a result of O'Connor's support for the WFTU, as well as his activities in the Caribbean Labour Congress (CLC), an organization dedicated to the independence of British Caribbean colonies and the spread of socialism, O'Connor was put on a list of leftists banned from traveling throughout the English-speaking Caribbean.

== Political career and activism ==
During the 1930s and '40s, O'Connor associated with a small group of left-leaning Trinidadian writers and thinkers, including Alfred Mendes, Albert Gomes, C. L. R. James, and Ralph de Boissière, among others. In the 1940s, O'Connor joined New Dawn, a Marxist group dedicated to Trinidadian independence. He also "godfathered" the Why Not Discussion Group, which regularly denounced British colonial policy and became a "focal point for dissent."

In 1942, O'Connor joined the West Indian National Party, which became a part of the United Front during the 1946 General Elections. During these elections, O'Connor campaigned on behalf of Gomes, who won a seat on the Legislative Council with more than 65 per cent of the vote. In the late 1940s, O'Connor broke with Gomes, who as a member of the Trinidad's Executive Council abandoned his pro-union sympathies and left-wing politics.

In the elections of 1950, O'Connor ran for a seat in the Legislative Council under the banner of the TTTUC, but lost with just over 30 per cent of the vote. In April 1951, he was one of the founding members of the West Indian Independence Party (WIIP). Because of its left-wing views, the WIIP was investigated by a British Commission led by Fred Dalley of the British TUC. The Commission claimed that WIIP was "communist-inspired and directed" and put pressure on O'Connor and others to quit the party. O'Connor refused to quit until he was ready to move on to other political endeavours. As a member of the Caribbean National Labour Party (CNLP), he contested a seat in Port of Spain North East, but lost with just under 9 per cent of the vote.

O'Connor was also active on behalf of a number of social and political causes throughout his life. In 1941, he submitted a memorandum to the Franchise Committee in favour of universal adult suffrage. In 1946, he spoke out against restrictions which banned panmen from playing their instruments in public places. He also spoke out against the racism experienced by Blacks who worked on the US Naval Base in Chaguaramas. During the war, O'Connor successfully opposed the introduction of a Sedition Bill, which would have curtailed civil liberties for the duration of the war.

In 1948, O'Connor sat on the Constitutional Reform Committee and signed the majority report, which reformed Trinidad and Tobago's political system without granting responsible government. However, at a CLC conference, he later withdrew his signature and supported a resolution in favour of Patrick Solomon's minority report that demanded immediate self-government.

== Death ==
O'Connor died from a stroke on 3 November 1958. The casket containing his body was followed by a large procession through the streets of Port of Spain en route to Lapeyrouse cemetery. Once at the cemetery, people stood graveside and gave panegyrics in his honour. Having observed the tributes paid to O'Connor at his funeral, then editor of The Nation and leading Caribbean intellectual C. L. R. James called for recognition of O'Connor as a great West Indian.

== Honours and legacy ==
In 1973, the government of Trinidad and Tobago posthumously awarded O'Connor the Chaconia Medal "For Long and Meritorious Service to Trinidad and Tobago" for his role in the birth and growth of the trade union movement.

In 1985, the government honoured his memory by issuing a stamp featuring his image as part of a series of stamps depicting great Trinidadian labour leaders. The Oilfields Workers' Trade Union's library is named in honour of him.
