= Caribbean People's Democratic Party =

The Caribbean People's Democratic Party was a political party in Trinidad and Tobago. It contested the 1956 general elections, but failed to win a seat. It did not contest any further elections.
