= St. Augustine Girls' High School =

Location
- Evans Street; St. Augustine; Trinidad and Tobago
- Coordinates: 10°38′12″N 61°24′15″W

Information
- Type: Secondary School
- Motto: Per Ardua ad Astra (Through hard work, to the stars)
- Established: September 19, 1950
- Principal: Linda Dharrie
- Gender: Girls
- Age: 11 to 19
- Enrollment: 700–750 (2013)
- Affiliation: Presbyterian
- Website: saghs.edu.tt

St. Augustine Girls' High School is one of five Presbyterian secondary schools in Trinidad and Tobago. It was founded in 1950 for girls between 11 and 19. It is a seven-year school, and caters to students writing both the Caribbean Examination Council (CXC) CSEC and CAPE exams. The school is among the top secondary schools in the country and cops several national scholarships annually.
