= Albert Gomes =

Trinidad and Tobago politician (1911–1978)

The Honourable Albert Gomes
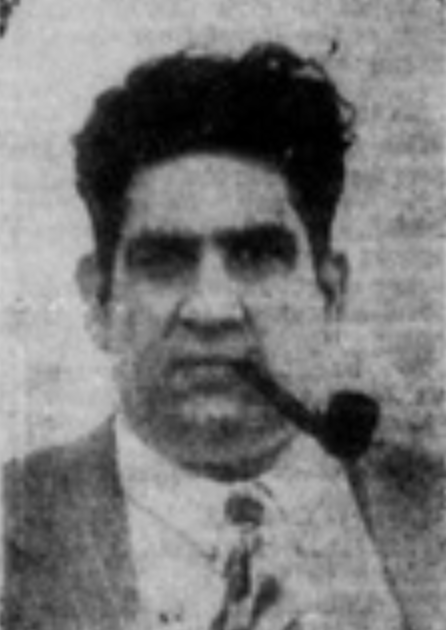

1st Chief Minister of Trinidad and Tobago
- In office 18 September 1950 – 28 October 1956
- Monarch: Elizabeth II
- Governor: Hubert Rance; Edward Beetham
- Preceded by: Chief Minister established
- Succeeded by: Eric Williams

Personal details
- Born: Alberto Maria Gomes; 25 March 1911 Belmont, Port of Spain, Saint George County, Trinidad and Tobago
- Died: 13 January 1978 (aged 66) London, UK
- Party: Independent (from 1963)
- Other political affiliations: Democratic Labour Party (1957–1963); West Indies Democratic Labour Party (1957–1962); Party of Political Progress Groups (1950–1957); United Front (1946)

Albert Maria Gomes (25 March 1911 – 13 January 1978) was a Trinidadian unionist, politician, and writer of Portuguese descent who was the first Chief Minister of Trinidad and Tobago. He was the founder of the Political Progress Groups and later led the Party of Political Progress Groups. He was active in the formation of the Democratic Labour Party (DLP) in Trinidad and Tobago and played a role in forcing Sir Alexander Bustamante out of the Federal Democratic Labour Party. Gomes briefly led the DLP in 1963 when factions loyal to him briefly ousted Rudranath Capildeo after Capildeo left Trinidad and Tobago to take up a position at the University of London. However, the rank and file of the party stood behind Capildeo, and Gomes left the party.

== Biography ==
Albert Gomes was born in Belmont, Port of Spain, Trinidad. His father had immigrated from Madeira in 1892; his mother's family had arrived in Trinidad in 1878 via Nevis and Antigua. After completing secondary school, Gomes studied journalism at City College of New York between 1928 and 1930. Returning to Trinidad, Gomes established a literary magazine called The Beacon, the first of its kind in the country, with contributors that included C. L. R. James, Alfred Mendes, and Ralph de Boissière. The Beacon was controversial and iconoclastic, and helped set the stage for Gomes' future work.

Gomes published The Beacon for three years until his father (who had financed the magazine) forced him to stop. He was installed in a pharmacy owned by his father, and for the next six years Gomes developed his connection with the working class. Gomes established a reputation as a writer for the Trinidad Guardian and through public lectures and work with the labour movement. In 1938, after the Labour riots of the previous year, he was elected to the Port of Spain City Council. He served on the Council for nine years and was Deputy Mayor for three years. In 1947, he lost his seat. In 1945, he was elected to the Legislative Council in a by-election. He was re-elected to the revamped Legislative Council in 1946 as a member of the West Indian National Party (WINP) for Port of Spain North. He retained that position until the 1956 General Elections when Eric Williams and the People's National Movement (PNM) swept to power.

During the 1940s, Gomes was the President of the Federated Workers Trade Union (FWTU), with Quintin O'Connor as the Secretary. Their success building up the FWTU was critical to the establishment of unionism in Trinidad and Tobago.

In 1958, Gomes was elected to the House of Representatives of the short-lived West Indies Federation, representing the district of St. George East.

After independence in 1962, Gomes was subject to heavy criticism by Eric Williams and the PNM. He left Trinidad and Tobago and settled in the United Kingdom. There he worked in local government until he retired in 1976. In 1974, he published his autobiography Through a Maze of Colour, followed by a novel with autobiographical elements in 1978. He wrote four more novels that were never published and are considered lost.

Gomes died in England on 13 January 1978 at the age of 66. His achievements are largely unrecognised and he has faded from the popular consciousness of Trinidad and Tobago.

== Publications ==
- 1973: "I Am an Immigrant", in Andrew Salkey (ed.), Caribbean Essays: An Anthology, London: Evans Brothers, pp. 53–59.
- 1974: Through a Maze of Colour (autobiography), Port of Spain: Key Caribbean Publications.
- 1978: All Papa's Children (novel), Surrey: Cairi Publishing House.
- 1978: "Back to 'Banana Bottom'" (from The Beacon, III, 3, October 1933), and "Black Man" (from The Beacon, I, 4, July 1931), in Reinhard W. Sander (ed.), From Trinidad: An Anthology of Early West Indian Writing, Hodder & Stoughton, 1978, pp. 33–35 and 223–26.

Preceded by none	Chief Minister of Trinidad and Tobago; 1950–56	Succeeded by Eric Williams
