= Satnarayan Maharaj =

Trinidad and Tobago politician (1931–2019)

Satnarayan Maharaj CM
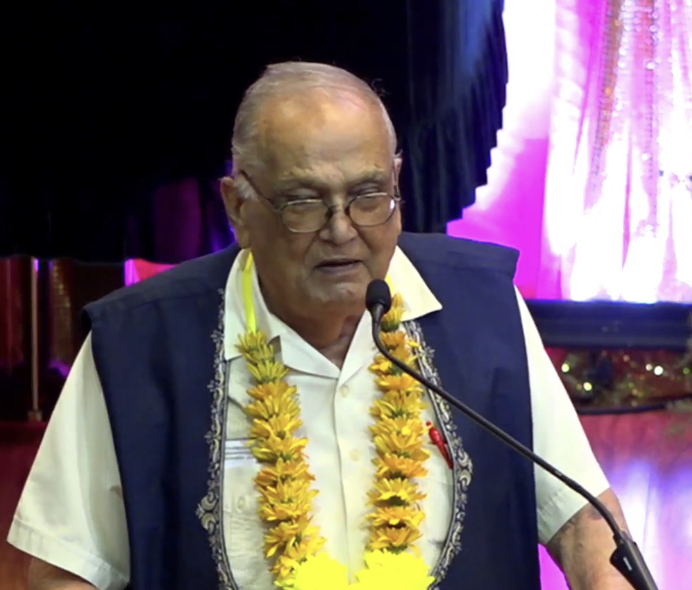

Secretary General of the Sanatan Dharma Maha Sabha
- In office 1977 – 16 November 2019
- Dharmacharya: Pt. Dr. Rampersad Parasram (5 May 2019 – 16 November 2019); Pt. Uttam Maharaj (30 April 2005-d. 29 November 2018); Pt. Krishna Maharaj (1986-2003); Pt. Sahadeo Persad Dubay Sharma (d. 1986)
- Upadharmacharya: Pt. Ganpat Maharaj
- President General: Pt. Krishna Rambally (2018-16 November 2019); Pt. Uttam Maharaj (30 April 2005-d. 29 November 2018); D. Omah Maharajh; Thirbhowan Seegobin
- Vice Secretary: Vijay Maharaj
- Preceded by: Simbhoonath Capildeo
- Succeeded by: Vijay Maharaj

Trustee of the Central Vishva Hindu Parishad
- In office 26 January 2011 – 26 January 2014

Assistant Secretary of the Sanatan Dharma Maha Sabha
- In office 1972–1977

President of the Caroni East Indian Association Youth Arm

Personal details
- Born: Satnarayan Maharaj; 17 April 1931 Chandernagore Village, Chaguanas, Caroni County, Trinidad and Tobago
- Died: 16 November 2019 (aged 88) Saint Joseph, Tunapuna–Piarco, Trinidad and Tobago
- Party: Democratic Liberation Party (1971)
- Spouse: Shanti Sagan Maraj (m. 1953; died 2009)
- Children: Vijay Maharaj (son); Vindra Maharaj (son); Vidya Satnarayan Maharaj (son, deceased); Vimala Tota-Maharaj (daughter); Sati Maharaj (daughter, deceased); Deviyani Gobin (daughter, deceased)
- Parents: Pt. Sieupersad Maharaj (father); Sirjudaye Maharaj (mother)
- Relatives: Bhadase Sagan Maraj (father-in-law); Deolatia Maharaj (paternal grandmother); Pt. Changa Maharaj (paternal grandfather); Pt. Rampartap Misir (maternal grandfather)
- Education: Caroni Canadian Mission School; San Juan Canadian Mission School; Biche Canadian Mission School; Plum Road Canadian Mission School; Holborn College
- Nickname(s): Sat Maharaj; Hanuman ji of Trinidad; The Bengal Tiger; The Big Boss

Religious life
- Religion: Hinduism
- Sect: Sanātanī

Religious career
- Teacher: Pt. Krishna Maharaj
- Awards: Chaconia Medal

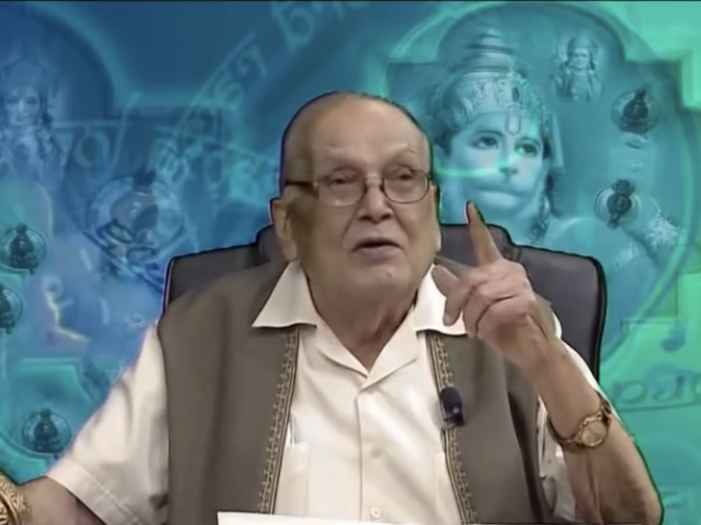
Satnarayan Maharaj on the Sanatan Dharma Maha Sabha’s TV and Radio Jaagriti's talk show The Maha Sabha Strikes Back.

Satnarayan Maharaj CM, also known as Sat Maharaj, (pronounced [sət̪ənɑːrɑːjəɳə məɦɑːrɑːɟə]; 17 April 1931 – 16 November 2019) was a Trinidadian and Tobagonian Hindu religious leader, educationalist, and civil rights activist in Trinidad and Tobago. He was the Secretary-General of the Sanatan Dharma Maha Sabha, a major Hindu organisation in Trinidad and Tobago and the wider Caribbean.

The Sanatan Dharma Maha Sabha operates 150 mandirs and over 50 schools in Trinidad and Tobago. It was formed in 1952 when Bhadase Sagan Maraj, the father-in-law of Satnarayan Maharaj, engineered the merger of the Satanan Dharma Association and the Sanatan Dharma Board of Control. An affiliated group, the Pundits' Parishad, has 200 affiliated pundits. The organisation's headquarters are located in St. Augustine.

Under the Secretary General Satnarayan Maharaj, the Maha Sabha has modernised all 42 schools and built 4 secondary schools as well as 12 early childhood educational centres. Maharaj has also revived the observance of Phagwah and was instrumental in the creation of the Indian Arrival Day holiday and annual celebrations. The Maha Sabha also introduced a Children's Cultural Festival - Baal Vikaas Vihar.
