= Party of Political Progress Groups =

The Party of Political Progress Groups (POPPG) was a political party in Trinidad and Tobago. It first contested national elections in 1950, when it received 3.4% of the vote and won two seats. After the elections its leader, Albert Gomes, was appointed Chief Minister despite the Butler Party winning six seats. In the 1956 elections it lost both seats, and in 1957 it merged into the Democratic Labour Party.
