= Rampersad Parasram =

Religious leader in Trinidad and Tobago

His Holiness Dharmacharya Pundit Doctor Rampersad Parasram
- Title: Dharmacharya of the Sanatan Dharma Maha Sabha of Trinidad and Tobago

Personal life
- Born: 27 May 1944 (age 82) Couva, Trinidad and Tobago
- Education: Panjab University; Government Medical College, Kottayam

Religious life
- Religion: Hinduism
- Institute: Sanatan Dharma Maha Sabha
- Sect: Sanātanī
- Ordination: 12 October 2019

Religious career
- Teacher: Dharmacharya Pt. Jankie Persad Sharma
- Post: 6th Dharmacharya of the Sanatan Dharma Maha Sabha Trinidad and Tobago

H.H. Dharmacharya Pt. Dr. Rampersad Parasram (pronounced [rɑːməprəsɑːd̪ə pərəsərɑːmə]; born 27 May 1944) is the current Dharmacharya of Sanatan Dharma Maha Sabha and is a religious leader, medical doctor, and politician in Trinidad and Tobago.
