= West Indian Independence Party =

Former Trinidad and Tobago political party

The West Indian Independence Party was a political party in Trinidad and Tobago. It contested the 1956 general elections, but failed to win a seat. It did not contest any further elections.
