= Pater Patriae =

Latin honorific meaning 'Father of the Fatherland'

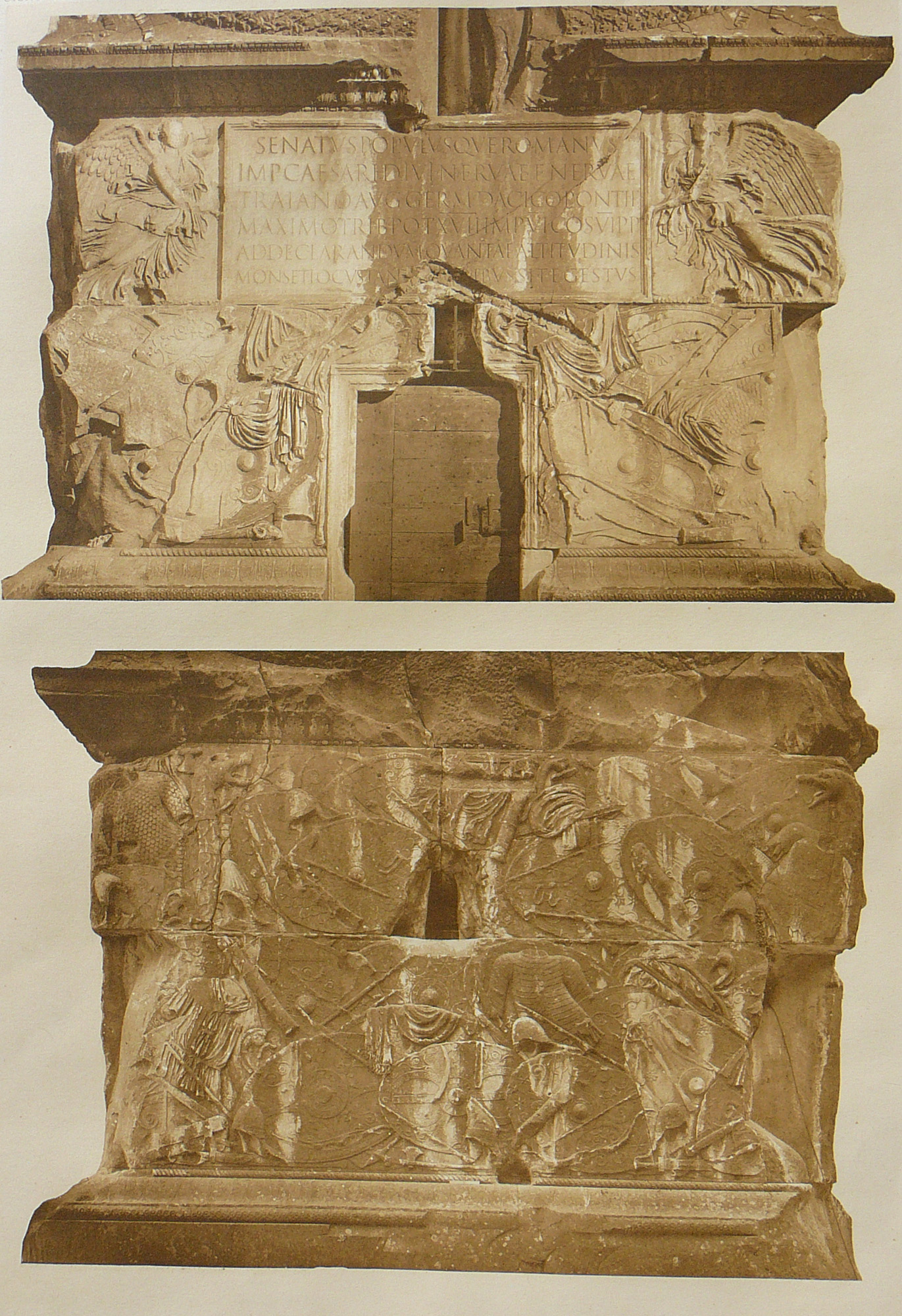
The inscription on Trajan's Column includes Pater Patriae as one of the titles of Trajan.

Pater Patriae (lit. 'Father of the Fatherland'; pl. Patres Patriae) was an honorific title in ancient Rome. The title was granted by the Roman Senate. During the Roman Republic, it was awarded only twice: to Camillus and Cicero. Under the Roman Empire, it was exclusively granted to the Roman emperor, usually after many years of successful rule. Not all emperors were offered the title, while others were offered it but refused to accept it. A total of 23 emperors received the title, beginning with Augustus.

During the early modern and late modern periods, the same Latin title was granted to several national leaders by their subjects or parliaments. More recently, the equivalent title has been father of the nation, translated into the national language.

== Roman history ==
Pater Patriae was awarded to the orator and statesman Marcus Tullius Cicero, for his part in the suppression of the Catilinarian conspiracy in 63 BC. A similar title, parens patriae, of similar but lesser connotation, was awarded to Julius Caesar, who had become de facto ruler of Rome as perpetual dictator. Caesar had packed the Senate with his own supporters, who voted him the title in 45 BC for having ended the civil wars that he had started himself.

In 2 BC Caesar Augustus was granted the title pater patriae by the Roman Senate. It thereafter became usual for the Senate to convey the title on emperors only after many years of successful rule.

As a result, many emperors with short reigns never received the title. In some cases (such as Nerva) it was granted rapidly, if the new emperor was particularly esteemed by the senators when they acceded. As a sign of humility, several emperors deferred their use of the title for some time even after it was conferred by the Senate. For example, Hadrian deferred it for eleven years.

The title could be declined. According to the historian Suetonius, Augustus' successor Tiberius was offered this title, but refused it as premature and inappropriate.

== Chronological list of holders ==
Pater Patriae
Year		Holder	Reference or notes
BC	753	Romulus	Legendary founder of Rome
BC	386	Marcus Furius Camillus	For liberating the city after the Gallic sack of Rome
BC	63	Marcus Tullius Cicero	For suppressing the Catilinarian conspiracy
BC	45	Gaius Julius Caesar	For ending his civil wars
BC	2	Augustus	
AD	37	Caligula	
AD	42	Claudius	
AD	55	Nero	
AD	70	Vespasian	
AD	79	Titus	
AD	81	Domitian	
AD	96	Nerva	
AD	98	Trajan	
AD	128	Hadrian	
AD	139	Antoninus Pius	
AD	166	Marcus Aurelius and Lucius Verus	
AD	177	Commodus	
AD	193	Septimius Severus	
AD	199	Caracalla	
AD	217	Macrinus	
AD	218	Elagabalus	
AD	238	Gordian III	
AD	276	Probus	
AD	284	Diocletian	
AD	286	Maximian	
AD	307	Constantine I	
AD	361	Julian	(Note: Julian's coin issued in 361 CE reads: FL CL IVLIA NVS P P AVG (Flavius Claudius Julianus Pater Patriae Augustus).)

== Later use by other countries ==
The Latin honorific was later used for several national leaders during the early modern period and late modern period. It was awarded by national parliaments or loyal subjects to: Cosimo de'Medici, de facto leader of Florence in the early 15th century, George Washington, the first President of the United States; King Gustav I of Sweden; the Dutch Stadtholder William of Orange; Pedro II, the last Emperor of Brazil; and the four leaders of Italian unification: Camillo Cavour, Giuseppe Garibaldi, Giuseppe Mazzini and King Victor Emmanuel II.

== See also ==
- List of national founders
- Victory title
