= Radio Jaagriti 102.7 FM =

Radio station in Trinidad and Tobago

- Tunapuna, Tunapuna-Piarco; Trinidad and Tobago
- Frequency: 102.7 MHz

Programming
- Languages: Trinidadian and Tobagonian English, Trinidadian Hindustani, Modern Standard Hindi, Sanskrit
- Format: Hindu religious programming
- Affiliations: TV Jaagriti

Ownership
- Owner: Central Broadcasting Services Limited (Sanatan Dharma Maha Sabha)

History
- First air date: 19 January 2007

Links
- Webcast: sdmsjaagriti.com

Radio Jaagriti 102.7 FM (pronounced [reːɖijoː ɟɑːɡrət̪i]) is a 24-hour radio station in Trinidad and Tobago formed by the Sanatan Dharma Maha Sabha to broadcast Hindu religious programming and to address the needs of the Hindu community in the media.

Radio Jaagriti 102.7 FM began broadcasts on 19 January 2007 at approximately 5:07 pm.

== See also ==
- TV Jaagriti
- Hinduism in Trinidad and Tobago
- Sanatan Dharma Maha Sabha
- Radio in Trinidad and Tobago
- List of religious radio stations
