= Lakshmi Girls' Hindu College =

Coordinates: 10.64691°N 61.40115°W

Lakshmi Girls' Hindu College, officially Shri Bhadase Sagan Maraj Lakshmi Girls' Hindu College, located in Trinidad and Tobago, is a school operated by the Sanatan Dharma Maha Sabha in the East-West corridor and is situated between Deane and McCarthy Street along the Eastern Main Road. The current principal is Sonia Mahase-Persad while the current vice principal is Cherrie-Anne Ramnarine. The school teaches several subject areas including visual arts, social studies, integrated science, English, math, history, geography, physics, chemistry, biology, sociology, Spanish, French, food and nutrition. There are also many co-curricular activities and extra curricular activities.

As of 2021, they have received six President's Medals; Shivrani Prabhudial in 2015 (Business Studies), Priya Maraj in 2016 (Environmental Sciences), Veshala Goon in 2017 (Business Studies), Amrita Singh in 2018 (General Studies), Celine Roodal in 2019 (Natural Sciences) and Nikeesha Nancoo in 2021 (Business Studies).

The school also holds competitions to help students with their learning. Some of these competitions are Annual Sports Day, Interhouse competition which is held so all houses compete against each other to win first place. Houses at Lakshmi Girl's are identified by their colour; for example, Saraswati house is known by their blue colour and red goes to Lakshmi house, purple to Shakti house, yellow to Vidya house and green to Sita house.

At Lakshmi Girls' all rules and regulations must be carried out carefully. On Tuesdays and Thursdays a Home Room period is held where every class spends some time with their form teacher to discuss matters concerning the class as well as to inspect the students nails, hair, proper uniform etc. Every Wednesday morning there are staff meetings held in the different subject departments.

Lakshmi Girls' Hindu College also partakes in many indoor and outdoor activities where there is participation from international and regional schools so that there is a broader connection to the rest of the world.
