= Workers and Farmers Party =

- Abbreviation: WFP
- Leader: Stephen Maharaj; C. L. R. James
- Founded: 1965
- Dissolved: 1966
- Split from: DLP
- Succeeded by: ULF
- Ideology: Marxism; Labourism

The Workers and Farmers Party was a Marxist political party in Trinidad and Tobago. The party was organised by former Democratic Labour Party leader Stephen Maharaj, C.L.R. James, George Weekes (of the Oilfields Workers Trade Union) and included the then little-known Basdeo Panday among its slate of candidates. It was succeeded by the United Labour Front led by Basdeo Panday.

The party contested the 1966 General Elections. It secured 3.5% of the vote and failed to win any seats in Parliament. None of its candidates secured the 12.5% of the vote in their constituency that was required to have their deposits refunded.

The major political impact of the WFP was that it launched the political career of Basdeo Panday.
