= Gobin =

Gobin may refer to:

- Gobin de Reims, 13th-century poet-composer
- Gabriel Gobin (1903–1998), Belgian film actor
- John P. S. Gobin (1837–1910), American politician and Union Army officer during the Civil War
- John Gobin (polo), American polo player

Gobin is also used by Hindu people of Indian descent in Trinidad and Tobago, Guyana, Suriname, other parts of the Caribbean, Fiji, South Africa, and Mauritius. It is derived from Govinda, and its variations Gobind, Gobinda, and Govind, which is another name for the Hindu deity Krishna and means lord of herdsmen. In India it is used as a first name, but many of the children of the indentured laborers in the aforementioned countries used their fathers' first name as their surname. People with the surname Gobin in this sense include:

- Maneesh Gobin, Mauritian Attorney General
- Sewram Gobin (born 1983), Mauritian footballer of Indian descent
- Soogee Gobin (1880-1952), matriarch of the Capildeo family in Trinidad and Tobago

Gobin is a word used in the North west of England to describe in a friendly manner someone who has just done something the wrong way.

== Place ==
- Gobin Village, Princes Town, Trinidad and Tobago
