= Movement for Unity and Progress =

The Movement for Unity and Progress was a political party in Trinidad and Tobago founded by Hulsie Bhaggan. It contested the 1995 general elections, but received just 0.4% of the national vote and failed to win a seat. The party did not contest any further national elections.
