= Ashford Sinanan =

Trinidad and Tobago politician

His Excellency Ashford Sastri Sinanan CM

Personal details
- Born: Ashford Sastri Sinanan; 2 January 1923 San Fernando, Trinidad and Tobago
- Died: 1994 (aged 71)
- Party: Independent (1951-1956; 1972-1974; 1976-death)
- Other political affiliations: West Indian National Party (1974-1976); Democratic Labour Party (1957-1972); West Indies Democratic Labour Party (1957-1962); People's Democratic Party (1956-1957); Butler Party (1950-1951)
- Spouse: Marjorie Roodal
- Relatives: Mitra Sinanan (brother)
- Occupation: Politician
- Awards: Chaconia Medal (1990)
- Nickname: The Bengal Tiger

HE Ashford Sastri Sinanan CM (pronounced [aːiɕəpʰoːrɖə ɕɑːst̪riː sinɑːnənə]; 2 January 1923 – 1994) was a politician from Trinidad and Tobago who served in various roles prior to and following Trinidad and Tobago’s independence in 1962. Along with his brother, Mitra, Sinanan helped draft portions of Trinidad’s constitution and later went on to serve as the country’s first High Commissioner to India. High office, however, ultimately eluded him: first, in his 1958 bid to become the first Prime Minister of the Federation of the West Indies, a contest that he narrowly lost by 2 seats to Barbados’ Sir Grantley Adams; and second, in 1974, when he resigned from his post as High Commissioner to India to found the West Indian National Party (WINP). The WINP ultimately failed to break the 20-year rule of then Prime Minister, Eric Williams.

Notable career highlights:

- Elected to Legislative Council, Victoria Constituency (1950)
- Member of Parliament, San Fernando
- Founder, Democratic Labour Party and Opposition Leader (1951–1956)
- Acting Speaker of the House, Parliament of Trinidad and Tobago (1955–1956)
- Chairman, Constitution Reform Committee (1955)
- Ambassador and Permanent Representative of Trinidad and Tobago to the Office of the U.N. and Specialized Agencies in Geneva (1973)
- High Commissioner to India (1974)

== Awards ==
- Chaconia Gold Medal awarded for Public Service (1990)

== See also ==
- George F. Fitzpatrick
- Politics of Trinidad and Tobago
