= Liberal Party (Trinidad and Tobago) =

The Liberal Party was a political party in Trinidad and Tobago. It contested the 1966 general elections, receiving 8.9% of the vote, but failed to win a seat. It did not contest any further elections.
