= Social Democratic Labour Party of Trinidad and Tobago =

Trinidadian political party

The Social Democratic Labour Party was a political party in Trinidad and Tobago. It contested the 1976 general elections, but received just 2% of the vote and failed to win a seat. It did not contest any further elections.
