= West Indian National Party =

- Abbreviation: WINP
- Founder: Quintin O'Connor; Rupert Gittens
- Founded: 18 November 1942
- Headquarters: Trinidad and Tobago
- Ideology: Socialism; progressivism; nationalisation of major industries
- Political position: Left-wing

The West Indian National Party was a political party in Trinidad and Tobago. It was originally founded on 18 November 1942 as a progressive party, aligned with the socialist views of trade unionists Quintin O'Connor and Rupert Gittens of Trade Union Congress. One of the key planks of their platform was the nationalisation of major industries. In 1945 Claude Lushington attended the Pan-African Congress in Manchester on behalf of the party.

Following the breakup of the Democratic Labour Party in 1974, the party was resurrected by Ashford Sinanan to contest the 1976 general elections. One of three parties to succeed the DLP, it received just 1,242 votes and failed to win a seat. It did not contest any further elections.
