= Sanatan Dharma Maha Sabha =

Hindu organization

- सनातन धर्म महा सभा 𑂮𑂢𑂰𑂞𑂢⸱𑂡𑂩𑂹𑂧⸱𑂧𑂯𑂰⸱𑂮𑂦𑂰
- Abbreviation: SDMS (internationally SDMSTT)
- Type: Hindu religious organization
- Classification: Sanātanī
- Scripture: Vedas · Puranas · Upanishads · Ramayan/Ramcharitmanas · Mahabharat (incl. Bhagavad Gita) · Manusmriti · other Hindu scriptures
- Theology: combination of Ramanandi Sampradaya, Vedanta (incl. Vishishtadvaita), Vaishnavism, Shaivism, Shaktism, Smartism, Sauraism, and other Hindu traditions
- Dharmacharya: Pt. Dr. Rampersad Parasram
- Secretary General: Vijay Maharaj
- President General: Pt. Krishna Rambally
- President of the Pundits' Parishad: Pt. Navin Omadath Maharaj
- Region: Trinidad and Tobago • United States (Houston, Texas)
- Language: Trinidadian Hindustani · Sanskrit · Modern Standard Hindi · Trinidadian and Tobagonian English
- Headquarters: Saint Augustine, Trinidad and Tobago
- Founder: Bhadase Sagan Maraj
- Origin: June 2, 1952; 74 years ago
- Recognition: Act 41 of 1952 of the Legislative Council of Trinidad and Tobago
- Merger of: Sanatan Dharma Association of Trinidad and Sanatan Dharma Board of Control
- Places of worship: 150
- Primary schools: 43
- Secondary schools: 5
- Tertiary institutions: 1

The Sanatan Dharma Maha Sabha (Hindustani pronunciation: [sənɑːt̪ənə d̪ʰərmə məɦɑː səbʰɑː]; SDMS), colloquially known as the Maha Sabha, is the largest and most influential Hindu organization in Trinidad and Tobago. It operates 150 mandirs, over 50 schools, and has its own radio station, Radio Jaagriti 102.7 FM, and TV channel, TV Jaagriti. They also operate the Indian Caribbean Museum of Trinidad and Tobago. It was formed in 1952 when Bhadase Sagan Maraj engineered the merger of the Sanatan Dharma Association and the Sanatan Dharma Board of Control. An affiliated group, the Pundits' Parishad, has 200 affiliated pundits. The organisation's headquarters are located in St. Augustine.

The Dharmacharya of the Maha Sabha is Pt. Dr. Rampersad Parasram, the President General is Pt. Krishna Rambally, and the Secretary General from 1977 to his death on November 16, 2019, was Satnarayan Maharaj, son-in-law of the founder, Bhadase Sagan Maraj. Satnarayan Mahahraj's son Vijay Maharaj has succeeded him as the acting Secretary General.

In 1881, a Sanatan Dharma Association was founded in Trinidad and Tobago in an attempt to consolidate Hindus and lobby on their behalf. This Association, however, was not known for any significant advances in Hindu organizational development. Other groups existed by the 1920s including the Trinidad Hindu Maha Sabha, San Feranado Hindu Sabha, and the Sanatan Dharma Prabartakh Sabha. But these, too, were not especially dynamic in shaping the course of Hindu history. The most significant advances in Hindu organizational development of these Sabhas came as a response to the Arya Samaj and its missionaries.

The controversies stirred by the Arya Samaj spokesmen acted as a kind of catalyst for the leaders of the Sanātanī (Orthodox Hindu) community to make greater strides towards effective organization. The Sanatan Dharma Association was incorporated by an act of Legislature in 1932. A conservative group of Hindus led by Pt. Sahadeo Tiwari, established a rival organization, the Sanatan Dharma Board of Control which was also incorporated in 1932. Each of these served to represent the interests of the Hindu community with regard to social action or issues surrounding the orthodoxy; they also served to liaise with colonial or parliamentary authorities. In 1935, in a move to demonstrate greater legitimacy, the Board became formally affiliated with the Sanatan Dharma Pratindhi Sabha based in Lahore, British India (present day Pakistan). Pundits and laymen throughout the island became affiliated with one or the other of the two national Hindu bodies. The Sanatan Dharma Board of Control, for example had branches in 32 villages by the late 1930s.

The greatest development in the Hindu communal activity in Trinidad and Tobago began in 1952 when under the guidance and direction of powerful Pt. Goberdhan JP of Siparia Old Road in southern Trinidad, British Trinidad and Tobago (who acted as a representative of the Governor General of Trinidad and Tobago at difficult times) Bhadase Maraj united the Sanatan Dharma Association and the Sanatan Dharma Board of Control. In that year Maraj, a self-made millionaire and sugar union leader, merged the two Sanātanī Hindu bodies, to create a much more powerful pressure group and public organization. The new organization, the Sanatan Dharma Maha Sabha, was incorporated in 1952. The Sanatan Dharma Maha Sabha's parishad, or council of pundits worked towards a complete coordination of temples activities and the standardization of ritual procedure. Relatively few structured, permanent religious groups existed in Trinidad's Indian villages until the advent of the Maha Sabha school building programme. Many mandirs were constructed or affiliated in addition. In order to ensure uniform teaching and practices, the Maha Sabha published literature to be used at all schools and temples.

Yet foremost on the new organization agenda was education, which its members saw as the key to promoting Hindu unity in all parts of the country, to promulgating the faith among future generations of Hindus, and to provide Indians with greater opportunities for social advancement. Between 1952 and 1956 the Maha Sabha built no less than 31 schools all over the island. Today the Maha Sabha operates 42 schools in Trinidad and Tobago, over 150 mandirs, and affiliated over 200 pundits.

== Dharmacharyas ==
- Pt. Basdeo Misir (1952-1954)
- Pt. Jankie Persad Sharma (1954-1977)
- Pt. Sahadeo Persad Dubay Sharma (1977-1986)
- Pt. Krishna Maharaj (1986-2003)
- Pt. Uttam Maharaj (30 April 2005 – 29 November 2018)
- Pt. Dr. Rampersad Parasram (5 May 2019-present)
