= 1938 Trinidad and Tobago general election =

- 1938
- 13 seats in the Legislative Council; 7 seats needed for a majority
Party	Leader	Seats	+/–
Trinidad Labour Party	Arthur Andrew Cipriani	3	0
Unionist Party	Adrian Cola Rienzi	1	New
Independent Labour	Sarran Teelucksingh	1	0
Independents	–	2	−1
This lists parties that won seats. See the complete results below.
Results by constituency

General elections were held in Trinidad and Tobago in 1938.

== Electoral system ==
The Legislative Council had 12 official members (civil servants), six nominated members, seven elected members and the Governor, who served as the legislature's speaker. The seven elected members were elected from single-member constituencies.

The franchise was limited to people who owned property in their constituency with a rateable value of $60 (or owned property elsewhere with a rateable value of $48) and tenants or lodgers who paid the same sums in rent. All voters were required to understand spoken English. Anyone who had received poor relief within the most recent six months before election day was disqualified from voting.

The restrictions on candidates were more severe, with candidature limited to men that lived in their constituency, were literate in English, and owned property worth at least $12,000 or from which they received at least $960 in rent a year. For candidates who had not lived in their constituency for at least a year, the property values were doubled.

== Results ==
Constituency	Candidate	Affiliation	Votes	Notes
Caroni County	Sarran Teelucksingh	Independent Labour	574	Re-elected
Caroni County	Clarence Abidh	Unionist Party	468	
Eastern Counties	Edward Vernon Wharton		–	Elected unopposed
Port of Spain	Arthur Andrew Cipriani	Trinidad Labour Party	–	Re-elected unopposed
Saint George County	Michael Aldwyn Maillard	Trinidad Labour Party	–	Re-elected unopposed
Saint Patrick County	Timothy Roodal	Trinidad Labour Party	–	Re-elected unopposed
Tobago	George de Nobriga		–	Elected unopposed
Victoria County	Adrian Cola Rienzi	Unionist Party	2,003	Elected
Victoria County	Harold Piper	Independent	547	
Source: John, Teelucksingh, Wyllie
