= 1933 Trinidad and Tobago general election =

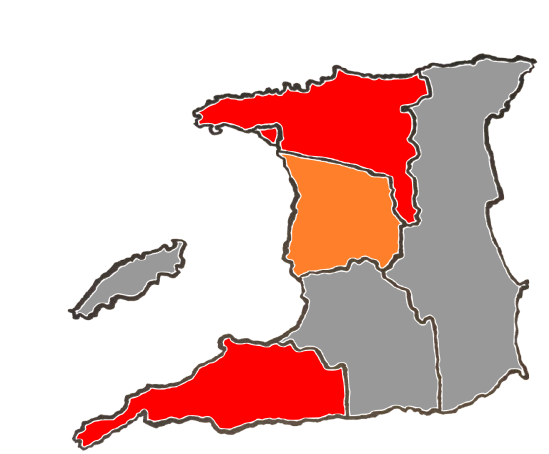
Results by constituency Independent Independent Socialist Trinidad Workingmens' Association

General elections were held in Trinidad and Tobago in early 1933.

== Electoral system ==
The Legislative Council had 12 official members (civil servants), six nominated members, seven elected members and the Governor, who served as the legislature's speaker. The seven elected members were elected from single-member constituencies.

The franchise was limited to people who owned property in their constituency with a rateable value of $60 (or owned property elsewhere with a rateable value of $48) and tenants or lodgers who paid the same sums in rent. All voters were required to understand spoken English. Anyone who had received poor relief within the most recent six months before election day was disqualified from voting.

The restrictions on candidates were more severe, with candidature limited to men that lived in their constituency, were literate in English, and owned property worth at least $12,000 or from which they received at least $960 in rent a year. For candidates who had not lived in their constituency for at least a year, the property values were doubled.

== Results ==
Candidates of the Trinidad Workingmens' Association won three of the seven seats.

Constituency	Electorate	Candidate	Affiliation	Votes	Notes
Caroni County	2,384	Sarran Teelucksingh	Independent Socialist	701	Re-elected
Caroni County	2,384	E.A. Robinson	Independent	645	
Eastern Counties	2,828	Charles Henry Pierre	Independent	–	Re-elected unopposed
Port of Spain	8,835	Arthur Andrew Cipriani	Trinidad Workingmens' Association	–	Re-elected unopposed
Saint George County	3,651	Michael Aldwyn Maillard	Trinidad Workingmens' Association	750	Elected
Saint George County	3,651	A.C.B. Singh	Independent Socialist	159	
Saint Patrick County	3,031	Timothy Roodal	Trinidad Workingmens' Association	–	Re-elected unopposed
Tobago	1,657	Isaac Hope	Independent	346	Elected
Tobago	1,657	J. King	Independent	117	
Victoria County	3,436	Thomas Meade Kelshall	Independent	791	Re-elected
Victoria County	3,436	Harold Mahabir	Trinidad Workingmens' Association	764	
Victoria County	3,436	Harold Piper	Independent Socialist	517	
Source: John, Teelucksingh
