= 1928 Trinidad and Tobago general election =

General elections were held in Trinidad and Tobago in early 1928. Four of the seven constituencies had a single candidate, with voting in the other three taking place on 11 February (Saint Patrick County and Tobago) and 3 March (Caroni County).

== Electoral system ==
The Legislative Council had 12 official members (civil servants), six nominated members, seven elected members and the Governor, who served as the legislature's speaker. The seven elected members were elected from single-member constituencies.

The franchise was limited to people who owned property in their constituency with a rateable value of $60 (or owned property elsewhere with a rateable value of $48) and tenants or lodgers who paid the same sums in rent. All voters were required to understand spoken English. Anyone who had received poor relief within the most recent six months before election day was disqualified from voting. The voting age for women was lowered from 30 to 21 prior to the elections, significantly increasing the number of people eligible to vote.

The restrictions on candidates were more severe, with candidature limited to men that lived in their constituency, were literate in English, and owned property worth at least $12,000 or from which they received at least $960 in rent a year. For candidates who had not lived in their constituency for at least a year, the property values were doubled.

== Results ==
Five candidates were supported by the Trinidad Workingmens' Association. Four of them – Arthur Andrew Cipriani, Francis Evelyn Mohammed Hosein, Timothy Roodal and Sarran Teelucksingh – were elected, whilst A. Bonnet was defeated in Tobago.

Constituency	Electorate	Candidate	Votes	Notes
Caroni County	2,190	Sarran Teelucksingh	623	Re-elected
Caroni County	2,190	A.E. Robinson	358	
Eastern Counties	2,833	Charles Henry Pierre	–	Re-elected unopposed
Port of Spain	7,550	Arthur Andrew Cipriani	–	Re-elected unopposed
Saint George County	2,916	Francis Evelyn Mohammed Hosein	–	Elected unopposed
Saint Patrick County	1,993	Timothy Roodal	691	Elected
Saint Patrick County	1,993	A.A. Sobrian	251	
Tobago	1,661	James Biggart	361	Re-elected
Tobago	1,661	A. Bonnett	55	
Victoria County	2,744	Thomas Meade Kelshall	–	Re-elected unopposed
Source: Teelucksingh
