= 1925 Trinidad and Tobago general election =

General election in Trinidad and Tobago

General elections were held in Trinidad and Tobago for the first time on 7 February 1925.

== Background ==
The Legislative Council had been established in 1831, but was a fully nominated body. In July 1921, San Fernando Borough Council called a public meeting at Carnegie Library, the result of which was a unanimous request for elected representation. Similar demands subsequently came from Arima and Port of Spain. Within a few years, the British authorities agreed to a partly elected legislative council, although with voting limited to a restricted franchise.

== Electoral system ==
The reorganised Legislative Council had 12 official members (civil servants), six nominated members, seven elected members and the Governor, who served as the legislature's speaker. The seven elected members were elected from single-member constituencies.

The franchise was limited to people who owned property in their constituency with a rateable value of $60 (or owned property elsewhere with a rateable value of $48) and tenants or lodgers who paid the same sums in rent. The voting age was 21 for men and 30 for women, and all voters were required to understand spoken English. Anyone who had received poor relief within the most recent six months before election day was disqualified from voting. Only 6% of the population were eligible to vote.

The restrictions on candidates were more severe, with candidature limited to men that lived in their constituency, were literate in English, and owned property worth at least $12,000 or from which they received at least $960 in rent a year. For candidates who had not lived in their constituency for at least a year, the property values were doubled.

== Results ==
Voter turnout was around 29%, with two constituencies having only one candidate. Three of the seven elected members – Arthur Andrew Cipriani, Charles Henry Pierre and Albert Victory Stollmeyer – were supported by the Trinidad Workingmens' Association, as was the losing candidate in Tobago, Isaac Hope.

Constituency	Candidate	Votes	Notes
Caroni County	Sarran Teelucksingh	491	Elected
Caroni County	E.A. Robinson	235	
Eastern Counties	Charles Henry Pierre	–	Elected unopposed
Port of Spain	Arthur Andrew Cipriani	2,557	Elected
Port of Spain	Randolph Rust	910	
Port of Spain	Gaston Johnson	378	
Saint George County	Albert Victor Stollmeyer	707	Elected
Saint George County	A. Cory Davies	206	
Saint Patrick County	Ernest Radcliffe Clarke	314	Elected
Saint Patrick County	A.A. Sobrian	269	
Tobago	James Alexander Biggart		Elected
Tobago	Isaac Hope		
Victoria County	Thomas Meade Kelshall	–	Elected unopposed
Source: Teelucksingh

=== Appointed members ===
Position	Member
Governor	Horace Byatt
Collector of Customs	Thomas Robert Cutler
Colonial Secretary	Thomas Alexander Vans Best
Acting Colonial Secretary	Robert Howard Furness
Director of Agriculture	William George Freeman
Director of Education	George Mackay
Director of Public Works	Matthew Alexander Murphy
General Manager of Railways	John Powter
Inspector General of Constabulary	George Hebert May
Protector of Immigrants	Arnauld Henry William De Boissiere
Acting Solicitor-General	Walter Harragin
Surgeon-General	Kenrick Stanton Wise
Treasurer	Henry Barclay Walcott
Nominated members	Henry Alcazar
Nominated members	Albert Bonus Carr
Nominated members	Alexander Frazer
Nominated members	George Frederick Huggins
Nominated members	Arthur Hutton McShine
Nominated members	Lennox O'Reilly
Source: Teelucksingh, Skinner
