= Cyrus Prudhomme David =

Trinidad and Tobago lawyer and politician (1867–1923)

Cyrus Prudhomme David (November 1867 – October 1923) was a Trinidad and Tobago lawyer, reformer, and member of the Legislative Council of Trinidad and Tobago. Born in Cedros in southwest Trinidad, David was mentored by author John Jacob Thomas and educated at Queen's Royal College in Port of Spain. He was one of the first non-white students to win an Island Scholarship, which allowed him to read law in Britain. After being called to the bar at Gray's Inn in 1889, David returned to Trinidad where he practiced law and became the secretary of the Legislative Reform Committee.

After being rejected for the position of stipendiary magistrate in Couva by the Colonial Office, David was appointed to the Legislative Council by Governor Cornelius Alfred Moloney as an unofficial member in 1904. As a member of the council David opposed the importation of indentured labour from India, and worked for local government reform. He resigned from the council in 1911 after he was appointed Commissioner of the Port of Spain Petty Civil Court.

== Early life and education ==
David was born in Cedros, in southwest Trinidad, in November 1867, the son of Ernest David. In 1869, John Jacob Thomas was appointed Clerk of the Peace in Cedros. Thomas became friends with Ernest David, and when he left Cedros in 1874, he took the younger David with him and enrolled him in Queen's Royal College in Port of Spain in 1882. David won an Island Scholarship in 1885, which allowed him to continue his education abroad. Only four scholarships were awarded each year, and by the 1880s only a few ("about four", according to historian Carl Campbell) had been awarded to non-white students, including David. David travelled to Britain, where he read law at Gray's Inn and was called to the bar in 1889, after which he returned to Trinidad and practiced law as a barrister.

== Political career ==
After returning from Britain, David became involved with the Legislative Reform Committee, a radical group which campaigned for elected government and a semi-representative franchise. Between 1892 and 1895 he served as secretary of the organisation. This proved to be a bad time to argue for this, given the 1888 publications of James Anthony Froude's The English in the West Indies, which promoted the theory that West Indians, especially non-white West Indians, were incapable of governing themselves. (Note: David's mentor, John Jacob Thomas, published, a rebuttal of Froude's book entitled Froudacity in 1889.) Froude's views were embraced by the Secretary of State for the Colonies Joseph Chamberlain who argued that West Indian whites and "half breeds" were "always incapable and frequently corrupt" while Black West Indians were "totally unfit for representative institutions".

In 1898 Chamberlain designated the commander of the local military forces an official member of the Legislative Council. At the time, the council consisted of official members—salaried government employees who held a position on the council by virtue of their job—and unofficial members, who were private citizens appointed by the governor. This change gave official members a majority on the council, where previously there had been an unofficial majority. Chamberlain's actions weakened the already limited power of local residents. In 1899 Chamberlain abolished the elected Port of Spain Borough Council and replaced it with an appointed Board of Town Commissioners.

Under the umbrella of the Ratepayers' Association and supported by young lawyers including David, Emmanuel Mzumbo Lazare, and Edgar Maresse-Smith, radicals pushed back against the erosion of local influence in the administration of the colony. In a 1902 article in The Trinidad Magazine, David argued that as long as Britain persisted in treating the colonies as merely "fields for the raising of tropical produce and taxpayers" the "demonstrations of loyalty on our part remain a hollow mockery".

In 1903 a proposal to install water meters and increase water rates resulted in the 1903 Water Riots, in which several people were killed and the Red House, the seat of government, was burned down. In the aftermath of the riots, the Commission of Enquiry recommended that the government appoint more Black people to responsible positions within the administration. In December 1903 Governor Cornelius Alfred Moloney recommended David for the position of stipendiary magistrate in Couva, describing him as "a lawyer in high standing [who] has the reputation of being a man of strong character and undoubted probity" and "the most suitable selection open to our choice". This recommendation was opposed by C. A. Harris of the Colonial Office who argued that it was wrong "as a matter of policy" to appoint another Black man to a legal office in the colony, given that that Attorney General, Vincent Brown, was Black. When Henry Alcazar, a member of the Legislative Council, raised the issue of why no local candidates were considered for the Couva magistracy, the acting Colonial Secretary responded that local candidates had been "fully put forward", and their claims had received consideration.

=== Appointment to Legislative Committee ===
Having failed to appoint him to the magistracy, Moloney was successful in appointing David as an unofficial member of the Legislative Council in 1904. By appointing David to the Legislative Council, Moloney sought to counter the influence of more radical Black organisers like Lazare and Maresse-Smith. David's appointment to the Legislative Council was also, according to political scientist Alvin Magid, "an opportunity for the Colonial Office to make amends" for the earlier rejection of David for position of magistrate.

In the Legislative Council, David played an important role in debates over Indian immigration and local government reform.

=== Indian indentureship ===
David was an opponent of the importation of Indian indentured labour to Trinidad and Tobago, believing it to be the cause of depressed wages among the local working class. Although the primary beneficiaries of the system were a relatively small number of large sugar planters, one third of the cost of immigration was funded by the government. In a council debate in 1904 he raised the issue, pointing out that while sugar planters insisted that there was a labour shortage in the colony, other sectors including public works and certain cocoa planters, did not report any shortage. David suggested that the cost of immigration should be covered in full by the sugar planters, or that the subsidy should be distributed to all planters, who could then use this to pay increased wages to their workers. David received little support on the council for his efforts, but he continued to campaign for the abolition of the government subsidy until 1911, when he resigned from the Legislative Council.

== Later life ==
David remained on the council until 1911 when he was appointed Commissioner of the Port of Spain Petty Civil Court. In 1920 he resigned from the civil service on health grounds and died in October 1923.

== Legacy ==
When John Jacob Thomas died impoverished in England in 1889, David (with financial assistance from Mzumbo Lazare) ensured that he received a proper burial. In this action, historian Selwyn Cudjoe saw a symbolic passing of the "intellectual baton" from Thomas to a younger generation of legal activists.

Although he was a reformer and was appointed to the Legislative Council to represent the interests of the Black population, David and other reformers like Alcazar and Lazare were unable to mobilise the working class. Historian Jerome Teelucksingh attributes this to their view of the working class as "irresponsible, unprepared, and uneducated". Although he was conscious of the needs of the Black population, David was also the product of an educational system that sought to impart a European classical education. He emphasised the connections to British culture, saying in a 1906 address to the Legislative Council "Our wants, few as they are, are British; our ideals, such as they are, are British in the best sense of that word." He saw aspects of African and Asian culture in the population as something to be replaced with British culture.

David was a mentor to Charles Henry Pierre, who served as mayor of Port of Spain in the 1920s and was among the first people elected to the Legislative Council in 1925.
