= 1946 Trinidad and Tobago local elections =

County Council elections were held in Trinidad and Tobago on 28 October 1946, alongside general elections.

== Background ==
Constitutional arrangements for local elections in Trinidad and Tobago were made in 1946. Five leaflets were delivered to voters, explaining voter registration, the new county councils and the voting procedure.

== Electoral system ==
The County Council elections used the same districts as the Legislative Council, but with each constituency electing two members instead of one.

== Results ==
County Council	Valid votes	Invalid ballots	Total ballots	Registered voters	Turnout
Caroni	23,075	4,501	16,478	28,760	57.29
Nariva–Mayaro	5,054	987	3,571	7,574	47.15
Saint David–Saint Andrew	8,358	275	4,960	11,203	44.27
Saint George	13,276	907	8,931	60,167	23.57
Saint Patrick	23,539	922	14,863	33,515	44.35
Tobago	3,313	125	1,965	7,731	25.42
Victoria	26,039	2,685	18,911	40,401	46.81
Total	102,654	10,402	69,679	189,361	36.80
Source: EBCTT

=== Elected members ===
County Council	Ward	Elected members
Caroni	Changuanas	Ivan Bertram Nichclas, Doon Emmanuel Ragoobir
Caroni	Couva	Harrison Johnson, Deby Wilchand Ragoonanaing
Caroni	Cunupia	Emrith Matuhura, Jankee Persad
Caroni	Montserrat	Raymond Smith, Ganga Persad
Nariva–Mayaro	Charuma	Alloy Hudson, Joseph Ramcharan
Nariva–Mayaro	Cocal	Kenneth Dougdeen, Ramkoon
Nariva–Mayaro	Guayaguayare	Mitchell Norvan Baptiste, Ernest Felix Archibald
Nariva–Mayaro	Trinity	Norman Orlando Theophilus Millington, Leo Rowley
Saint David–Saint Andrew	Manzanilla	Samuel Juteram, James P Thomas
Saint David–Saint Andrew	Matura	Albert Gerald Nathaniel, Alfred Basden
Saint David–Saint Andrew	Tamana	Pertab Methura, Horatio Matthew Moolchan
Saint David–Saint Andrew	Toco	John Philip Henry Hutton, Frederick Clever Lovelace
Saint David–Saint Andrew	Turure	Cuthbert P Charles, Laurence Sooklal
Saint David–Saint Andrew	Valencia	Conrad M Johnson, James S Maycock
Saint George	Arima	Richard Ribeiro, Nellie John
Saint George	Blanchisseuse	Mathias James, Noel Hochoy
Saint George	Diego Martin	Elias George Romany, George Hamilton Charles
Saint George	San Rafael	Vernon Scott Duff, Thomas Fidel De Matas
Saint George	St Ann's	Mohammed Jan, A J Ford
Saint George	Tacarigua	George Kanchan Jitman, Rattan K Harracksingh
Saint Patrick	Cedros	Lee Petrette Sylvester, Manmohansingh
Saint Patrick	Erin	Ethelbert Fitzroy Shurland, Cecil Gittens
Saint Patrick	La Brea	Adjolhasingh, David I Lynch
Saint Patrick	Siparia	Ramlal, R Kallicharan
Tobago	St Andrew	William Elder, Egbert Patrick Alleyne
Tobago	St George	Robert Douglas Smith, Joseph Cecil Ferreira
Tobago	St David	Peter Collins Dick, Patrick Nathaniel Kerr
Tobago	St John	Linsel Wilton Alleyne, Le George Garnette Moore
Tobago	St Mary	Malco Duncan
Tobago	St Patrick	Duport George, George Rowe
Tobago	St Paul	John Edwards, Alphaeus Phillip
Victoria	Moruga	John Eric Bostock, Sydney Adolphus Warner
Victoria	Naparima	Joseph F Seunath, John E Commissiong
Victoria	Ortoire	Vernon Wentworth Lewis, Seemungal Gopaul
Victoria	Pointe-a-Pierre	George Deosingh, Linton Gibbon
Victoria	Savana Grande	Alexander Lal Mahabir, Stephen C Maharaj
