= East Indian National Association =

The East Indian National Association (EINA) was an organisation established in 1897 to represent the interests of the Indian population in Trinidad and Tobago. They played an influential role in the early twentieth century, but their impact declined in the 1920s.

== Foundation ==
The EINA was established in opposition to Immigration Ordinance No. 12 of 1897. The ordinance defined "immigrant" to include free Indians who had completed their term of indentureship and locally born Indians, and thus placed them under the same obligations are indentured immigrants.The ordinance required free Indians to carry a "Certificate of Exemption from Indentured Labour" or face arrest.

In the same year a group of Indians petitioned the West Indian Commission to request Indian representation on the Legislative Council of Trinidad and Tobago. This request was denied.

The organisation was formally established in Princes Town in 1898 with George Fitzpatrick as president. The leadership was dominated by Christian Indians, mostly Presbyterian converts, but also included Hindu and Muslim leaders.

== Positions and role ==
The EINA served as a "middle class pressure group" similar to the London-based East India Association. They strengthened this connection by appointing Dadabhai Naoroji an honorary member. Naoroji, a former member of the British Parliament, was the founder of the East India Association.

The aim of the organisation was "to promote harmony among East Indians and their descendants", and its focus was primarily on issues that concerned the community as a whole.

== Activities ==
In 1909 the EINA president, George Fitzpatrick served as the official representative of Indians in Trinidad before the Sanderson Committee (formally the Committee on Emigration from India to Crown Colonies and Protectorate) in London. Fitzpatrick used the opportunity to criticise the abuses of the indentureship system and the tight controls it placed on the movements of indenture. He also made the case to the committee that Indians in Trinidad needed more representation on the Legislative Council than could be provided by the Protector of Immigrants, who did little to address the abuses suffered by indentured workers. In 1912 Fitzpatrick was appointed to the Legislative Council as an unofficial member. He was the first Indian to serve on the council.

Until 1909 the EINA was the main organisation representing the interests of Indians in Trinidad. In 1909 it was joined by the East Indian National Congress (EINC) a more radical organisation formed in Couva under the leadership of F.E.M. Hosein. Like the EINA, the EINC was a middle class organisation which was interested in working with the colonial administration to protect the interests of Indian immigrants. In 1921 a third group, the Young East Indian Party was formed, in part by members of the EINA and EINC.

=== Political reform ===
In October 1912 Joseph Pointer, the British Labour Party's liaison to the Trinidad Workingmen's Association (TWA), visited Trinidad and met with the leadership of the EINA in Princes Town and later addressed a predominantly Indian audience in San Fernando. Pointer encouraged the EINA to work towards representative government in Trinidad and Tobago. Despite the TWA's opposition to Indian indentureship, the EINA and EINC were able to convince Pointer not to take a stand against Indian immigration.

=== Electoral activities ===
Elected members were added to the Legislative Council for the first time in 1925. The EINA was active in the 1925 general elections, supporting Arthur A. Sobrian in the Saint Patrick seat. Sobrian, who had been the sole Indian member of the council before the election, lost to Ernest Radcliffe-Clarke, a white planter. The EINA supported Sobrain again the 1928 general elections, but he was again defeated, this time by Timothy Roodal, who was endorsed by the TWA.

Historian Jerome Teelucksingh sees Sobrian's successive electoral defeats as a sign of the declining influence of the EINA.
