= Henry Alcazar =

Trinidad and Tobago politician (1860–1930)

Sir Henry Alcazar
- Born: Henry Albert Alcazar, KC; 30 September 1860; Port of Spain, Trinidad
- Died: 13 July 1930 (aged 69); England
- Occupations: Barrister; politician
- Years active: 1882–1930

Sir Henry Albert Alcazar, KC (30 September 1860 – 13 July 1930) was a Trinidadian politician who served as the mayor of Port of Spain and a member of the Legislative Council of Trinidad and Tobago. A reformer, Alcazar campaigned for the inclusion of elected members in the Legislative Council. In the aftermath of the 1903 Water Riots, Alcazar successfully defended people charged with inciting a riot. In 1915, he was appointed to the Executive Committee which advised the Governor of Trinidad and Tobago, and was knighted in 1918.

== Early life and education ==
Alcazar was born in Port of Spain to an upper middle class, mixed-race family. He was the son of John Alcazar and Pauline (née Durand de Beauval). He was educated at St. Mary's College in Port of Spain, and the University of London. He was called to the bar at Gray's Inn in London in 1882, and returned to Trinidad and Tobago that year.

== Career ==
Alcazar worked as a barrister 1882 until his death in 1930. He was appointed Queen's Counsel (which became King's Counsel in 1901 upon the death of Queen Victoria on 22 January 1901) in 1897 at the age of 37. In the early part of the twentieth century, Alcazar had the largest private practice in the colony and represented both prominent companies and successfully defended the men who were charged with inciting the 1903 Water Riots.

== Political career ==
Alcazar served in public office as both a member of the Port of Spain Borough Council and as a member of the Legislative Council. During the 1880s and 1890s Alcazar was a leading figure in the Reform Movement, which campaigned for elected membership in the Legislative Council.

=== Port of Spain Borough Council ===
Alcazar was elected to the Port of Spain Borough Council and served as mayor from 1892 to 1894, and again from 1896 to 1898. In 1898-1899 the imperial government abolished the elected borough council and replaced it with a body that was nominated by the Governor.

=== Legislative Council ===
In 1894 Alcazar was appointed to the Legislative Council where he served as an unofficial member, the second non-white person to be appointed to the council. At the time, the council consisted of official members—salaried government employees who held a position on the council by virtue of their job — and unofficial members, who were private citizens appointed by the governor. Alcazar resigned from the council in protest in 1898 when the Port of Spain Borough Council was abolished, but was reappointed to the council in 1903. He remained a member of the council until his death in 1930.

As a member of the Legislative Council, Alcazar opposed the crown colony model of government and wanted locals to have more say in the government of the colony. He campaigned for the inclusion of elected members in the Legislative Council; he wanted Trinidad and Tobago to remain within the British Empire, but desired a status similar to what was enjoyed by people in the Dominions like Canada and Australia.

In March 1903, the Legislative Council debated a contentious new ordinance concerning water rates. As a member of the council, Alcazar opposed the government's attempt to prevent the public from entering the Council Chamber to witness the debate. His walk out of the chamber in protest triggered the 1903 Water Riots in which several people were killed by the police and military, and the Red House was burnt down. After the riots, Alcazar defended the people who were put on trial for inciting a riot; all of them were acquitted. He also represented the interests of the public during the subsequent Commission of Enquiry.

In 1915, Alcazar was appointed to the Executive Committee, which advised the Governor on policy and administration. In this capacity, he continued to work for in inclusion of elected members in the Legislative Council, a proposal which was finally adopted in 1924. Alcazar remained a member of the Executive Council until his death in 1930. He was knighted in 1918, an honour which was rarely bestowed to colonial subjects who were neither government officials nor judges.

== See also ==
- 1925 Trinidad and Tobago general election
- Cyrus Prudhomme David
