= Adrian Cola Rienzi =

Trinidad and Tobago politician

Adrian Cola Rienzi ORTT (born Krishna Deonarine on 19 January 1905, died Desh Bandu on 21 July 1972) was a Trinidadian trade unionist, civil rights activist, politician and lawyer.

== Early life and education ==
Krishna Deonarine was born in Palmyra, Princes Town, Trinidad and Tobago to a Brahmin Indo-Trinidadian family whose original surname was Tiwari. His family originated from North India. His grandfather Chaithnath Tiwari had fled Bihar, India in order to escape British vengeance for participating in the Indian Rebellion of 1857. In Trinidad, his grandfather had married Lakshmi, the granddaughter of a general in the army of Babu Veer Kunwar Singh, who also had participated in the Indian Rebellion of 1857. His father, Deonarine Tiwari, squandered the inheritance from his grandfather and was forced to move the family to his grandmother's shop on Coffee Street in San Fernando. Krishna attended Naparima College, but his family's financial problems forced him to drop out during Form 3.

After leaving school, Deonarine took a job as a law clerk with the law firm of J.C. Hobson, a prominent lawyer, on Harris Promenade, in San Fernando. Hobson encouraged Deonarine to learn and lent him books from which he learned about Cola di Rienzo, fourteenth century Italian activist and patriot. Adrian Clarke, an English magistrate, also mentored Deonarine. Influenced by Hobson and Clarke, Deonarine decided to become a lawyer. This meant going to England to study; to avoid problems that his obviously Indian name might cause, Deonarine changed his name to Adrian Cola Rienzi in 1927. He chose the name Adrian after Adrian Clarke, and Cola Rienzi after Cola di Rienzo.

Rienzi studied at Trinity College in Dublin, where he joined the Irish section of the League Against Imperialism. He tried to go to India to work against imperialism, but was denied a visa to travel there. Unable to travel to India, Rienzo moved to London in 1931 where he entered the Middle Temple. In London, Rienzi became close with Shapurji Saklatvala, an Indian-born socialist and trade unionist who had served as a member of the British Parliament. Rienzi worked with Saklatava as part of the Indian Freedom League and the Indian Independence League, and maintained close ties with the Irish Republican Congress and the US-based Universal Negro Improvement Association.

In 1934, Rienzi was called to the Bar and returned to Trinidad. His application for admission to the local Bar was rejected because he was considered a "communist agitator", and it was only thanks to the intervention of British Labour politician Stafford Cripps that Rienzi was able to gain admission to the Bar.

After 1943, Cola Rienzi renamed to Desh Bandhu (National Patriot).

== Career ==
=== Trade union leader ===
He founded both the Oilfields Workers' Trade Union and the All Trinidad Sugar Estates and Factory Workers Union, and was involved in the establishment of three other trade unions. In 1936, after breaking with Arthur Cipriani and his Trinidad Labour Party, Rienzi founded his own party, the Trinidad Citizens League, which was based on the workers in the sugar belt in mid and south Trinidad. He was also the first president of the Trinidad and Tobago Trades Union Council, from its foundation in 1938 until 1944.

=== Borough Council and Legislative Council ===
Rienzi also served four terms on the San Fernando Borough Council (three as Mayor of San Fernando) and represented Victoria on the Legislative Council from 1937 to 1944. He then worked in the public service as a Crown Counsel.

=== Advocate for Indo-Trinidadians ===
In addition to fighting for workers rights, Rienzi also worked for the rights of Indo-Trinidadians. He helped secure more employment of Indo-Trinidadians in the public service, the right to cremation, the recognition of Hindu and Muslim marriages and the establishment of schools by non-Christian religious groups.

== Honours ==
The Rienzi-Kirton Highway in San Fernando is named partly in honour of him. The Rienzi Complex, former headquarters of the United National Congress and the All Trinidad Sugar and General Workers' Trade Union, on the Southern Main Road in Exchange Village, Couva is named after him.
