= Social unrest in Trinidad and Tobago =

Social unrest has shaped the development of Trinidad and Tobago since the middle of the 19th century. Attempts by the British colonial government to crack down on the celebration of Carnival sparked the Canboulay Riots in 1881 and 1884. Attempts to control the celebration of Hosay by the Indian population culminated in the Hosay Riots in 1884. In the early 20th century, the Water riots culminated in the destruction of the Red House, the seat of government, by a mob of protestors.

In response to poor working conditions and inadequate pay, the Labour riots of 1937 shook Trinidad and led to the birth of the trade union movement. Labour problems again resulted in unrest in 1965. The rise of the Black Power movement late in the 1960s culminated in the 1970 Black Power Revolution which threatened the government of Prime Minister Eric Williams. In 1975 there was labour unrest when the major unions representing oil workers and sugar workers marched in San Fernando and were met by brutal police resistance. This became known as "Bloody Tuesday". Further unrest in the 1970s had little lasting impact. The economic downturn following the end of the oil boom saw the People's National Movement losing power after 30 unbroken years in government. Austerity measures introduced by the new National Alliance for Reconstruction government led to a series of protests by labour and social groups. One of these groups, the Islamist Jamaat al Muslimeen staged an attempted coup d'état in July 1990.
