= 1950 Trinidad and Tobago general election =

- 18 September 1950
- All 18 seats in the Legislative Council
- Turnout: 70.13 (▲17.21pp)
Party	Leader	Vote %	Seats	+/–
Butler Party	Tubal Uriah Butler	22.07	6	+3
TUCSP		10.48	1	−1
Labour Party	A. P. T. James	7.89	2	+2
POPPG	Albert Gomes	3.42	2	New
CSP	Patrick Solomon	2.38	1	New
Independents	–	49.00	6	+5
This lists parties that won seats. See the complete results below.
Subsequent Chief Minister
Albert Gomes; POPPG

General elections were held in Trinidad and Tobago on 18 September 1950. The Butler Party emerged as the largest in the Legislative Council, winning six of the 18 seats. Voter turnout was 70%.

== Results ==
Party	Votes	%	Seats	+/–
Butler Party	41,928	22.07	6	+3
Trades Union Congress and Socialist Party	19,917	10.48	1	–1
Trinidad Labour Party	14,992	7.89	2	+2
Trade Union Council	9,025	4.75	0	New
Party of Political Progress Groups	6,507	3.42	2	New
Caribbean Socialist Party	4,529	2.38	1	New
Independents	93,100	49.00	6	+5
Total	189,998	100.00	18	+9
Valid votes	189,998	95.72		
Invalid/blank votes	8,492	4.28		
Total votes	198,490	100.00		
Registered voters/turnout	283,050	70.13		
Source: Nohlen
