= A. P. T. James =

Trinidad and Tobago politician

Alphonso Philbert Theophilus "Fargo" James (c. 1901 – 7 January 1962) was a Trinidad and Tobago politician. He was elected to the Legislative Council in 1946. He served in the Legislative Council until 1961 when he was defeated by A. N. R. Robinson. James was known as "Fargo", after a brand of trucks, because of his strength and tendency to crush opponents. He was known as being a proponent of Tobagonian secession from Trinidad and Tobago.

== Early life ==
A. P. T. James was born in the village of Black Rock, Tobago.

== Political life ==
In 1919 James left Tobago for Trinidad, where he worked in the oil fields and later as a stevedore, working for Brighton Lake Asphalt, which produced and exported asphalt from the Pitch Lake in La Brea. He initially joined the Trinidad Workingmen's Association led by A. A. Cipriani and later the Federated Workers Trade Union led by Albert Gomes and Quintin O'Connor. James became a union organiser and represented oil and asphalt workers.

James became a successful businessman, supplying labour contracts in the oil fields and stevedore services in Port of Spain. He was elected to the Legislative Council in 1946 representing Tobago. He was first elected on a Butler Party ticket, but after falling out with T. U. B. Butler, he affiliated with Patrick Solomon's Caribbean Socialist Party. James later represented the Trinidad Labour Party and the Democratic Labour Party.

After being defeated by Robinson in the 1961 General Elections, James retired from politics and died shortly thereafter.
