= Sarran Teelucksingh =

Trinidad and Tobago businessman and politician (1889–1952)

The Honourable Sarran Teelucksingh OBE JP

Member of the Legislative Council for Caroni
- In office 1925–1946

President of the Sanatan Dharma Association
- In office 1932–1951

Personal details
- Born: Ramsaran Lionel Teelucksingh; 2 August 1889 California, Caroni County, Trinidad and Tobago
- Died: 8 March 1952 (aged 62) Belmont, Port of Spain, Trinidad and Tobago
- Resting place: Saint Andrew's Anglican Church Cemetery, Couva, Trinidad and Tobago
- Party: Trinidad Labour Party (1934-d.)
- Other political affiliations: Trinidad Workingmen’s Association (till 1934); East Indian National Congress
- Spouse(s): Popatia Rosalind Peertamsingh; Ramkumari Olivia Harracksingh
- Parents: Teeluck Singh (father); Jumni Christine Ramdialsingh (mother)

The Hon. Ramsaran Lionel "Sarran" Teelucksingh OBE JP (2 August 1889 – 8 March 1952) was a Trinidad and Tobago businessman and politician. The first Indo-Trinidadian elected to the Legislative Council, Teelucksingh represented the county of Caroni from 1925 until 1946 and was active in the leadership of the Trinidad Workingmen's Association (TWA), Trinidad Labour Party (TLP), and the East Indian National Congress (EINC).

== Early life and activism ==
Sarran Teelucksingh was 2 August 1889 in California, Caroni County, Trinidad and Tobago into a Kshatriya Hindu Indo-Trinidadian family to Teeluck Singh, a former indentured labourer from Arrah in Bihar, India, and Jumni Christine Teelucksingh (née Ramdialsingh), who was from Sum Sum Hill in Claxton Bay and the daughter of Indian indentured immigrants.

Teelucksingh was a businessman and pioneer of the cinema industry in Trinidad and Tobago during the 1920s and 30s. Using a cinema operated out of a tent, he was able to screen movies in remote villages whose residents would not have otherwise had access.

Around 1921 Teelucksingh partnered with Reverend Charles David Lalla to launch The East Indian Patriot, (Note: According to Rampersad, the oldest-known copy of the Patriot is Volume 2, Number 10, dated to June 1923. From that, she deduced that the first issue would probably have come out in September 1921.) a magazine aimed at the Indo-Trinidadian community, which also served to promote Teelucksingh's political career. In 1925 he was appointed Vice-President of the TWA.

Teelucksingh served as president of the EINC and, according to historian Kelvin Singh, "converted [it] into an electoral machine". After the establishment of the Sanatan Dharma Board of Control in the early 1930s, Teelucksingh created a rival Hindu group, the Sanatan Dharma Association of Trinidad with Teelucksingh as its president. He justified his leadership as an Anglican Christian of a Hindu group "since the Hindu religion was that of his forefathers".

== Electoral career ==
=== 1925 elections ===
In 1925, the Legislative Council was expanded from 21 to 25 members, including seven elected members. Voting was limited to literate men who were 21 or older, and came with property and income requirements. Property and income requirements for candidates were higher than those for voters. The elections took place on 7 February 1925. Only 5.9% of the population were eligible to vote.

Teelucksingh contested the County Caroni seat in Central Trinidad against E.A. Robinson, a white planter, and won 491 votes to Robinson's 235. A third candidate, A. Bharat Gobin, also entered the race but withdrew from the race under pressure from the EINC which was concerned that the presence of two Indo-Trinidadian candidates would split the Indian vote.

=== Later elections ===
The 1928 and 1933 elections were rematches between Teelucksingh and Robinson. Teelucksingh won both elections. In 1938 Teelucksingh defeated Clarence Abidh, a fellow Christian Indo-Trinidadian, to win a fourth term on the Legislative Council.

=== 1946 election ===
The general elections in 1946 were the first to feature universal suffrage. Teelucksingh competed against Clarence Abidh of the Trades Union Congress and Socialist Party and Simbhoonath Capildeo who ran under the banner of the United Front. Teelucksingh, who expressed concern about the challenge of campaigning to an enlarged electorate, lost the election, receiving 2,117 votes to Abidh's tally of 7,321 votes and Capildeo's 5,692.

== Activity in the Legislative Council ==
Teelucksingh's campaign for the Legislative Council in 1925 included promises of repatriation to India for former indentured labourers who desired it. For this reason, the East Indian Weekly (a successor publication to Teelucksingh's East Indian Patriot) considered Teelucksingh a "self–seeking opportunist" and dismissed this platform as "wild promises" in an editorial in 1931. Despite this, the East Indian Weekly was supportive of the three Indo-Trinidadian representatives — Teelucksingh, Timothy Roodal and F. E. M. Hosein — when they raised the concerns of the community.

In the Legislative Council Teelucksingh formed a loosely-aligned group with fellow TWA members A. A. Cipriani (who was elected along with Teelucksingh in 1925) and Timothy Roodal who joined them on the council following the 1928 elections. The three TWA-aligned council members, together with F. E. M. Hosein (the elected representative for St. George County), functioned as the representatives of the working class on the council. After conflict with Cipriani over the divorce legislation in 1931, Teelucksingh broke his ties with the TWA and ran in subsequent elections as an "Independent Socialist".

Teelucksingh expressed support for self-governance and a federation of the West Indian colonies when a resolution in favour of federation was brought up in the Legislative Council in July 1945.

=== Divorce legislation ===
In 1931 the government introduced a bill to legalise divorce. The bill pitted the Catholic French Creole elite against the Protestant British administrative class. Cipriani sided with the Catholic Church in opposition to the bill and tried to rally the TWA to his cause. This caused a rift between him and his younger, more radical supporters. Teelucksingh, a vice-president of the TWA, voted to support the divorce legislation. This angered Cipriani who struck Teelucksingh in the legislative chamber. Cipriani's actions resulted in his suspension for one day from the Legislative Council, and angered Teelucksingh's supporters. The EINC condemned Cipriani's actions and 850 Indo-Trinidadian members of the TWA resigned.
