= Isaac Hope =

British-born Trinidad and Tobago politician (1865–1956)

Isaac Arbuthnot Hope

Member of the Legislative Council of Trinidad and Tobago
- In office 1932–1938
- Preceded by: James Biggart
- Succeeded by: George de Nobriga
- Constituency: Tobago

Personal details
- Born: 1865 United Kingdom
- Died: 1956 (aged 90–91) Trinidad and Tobago
- Party: Trinidad Workingmen's Association, Independent

Isaac Arbuthnot Hope (1865–1956) was a British-born Trinidad and Tobago politician and planter who represented Tobago in the Legislative Council of Trinidad and Tobago from 1932 to 1938.

== Early life and career ==
Hope was born in the United Kingdom and moved to Tobago in his youth. He worked as a clerk for a merchant and later became a planter, also owning a general store in Scarborough.

== Electoral career ==
=== 1925 elections ===
In 1925, the Legislative Council was reformed to include elected members for the first time. The council was expanded from 21 to 25 members, seven of whom were elected. The addition of a member for Tobago gave the island its first elected representatives since 1877, when the Crown colony government had been instituted. Voting was limited to literate men aged 21 or older and came with property and income requirements. The property and income requirements for candidates were even higher than those for electors. Only 5.9% of the population met the eligibility requirements to vote. In Tobago, only 547 of 1,800 eligible voters participated.

Hope ran against James Biggart, a Black Tobagonian pharmacist who stood as an independent candidate. Hope ran as a Labour candidate and was endorsed by Captain Arthur Andrew Cipriani and the Trinidad Workingmen's Association. Hope lost the election to Biggart.

=== Later elections ===
After Biggart's death in 1932, Hope ran unopposed as an independent in the by-election to fill the seat and was sworn in on 21 October 1932. In the 1933 general elections, Hope, running again as an independent, beat J. King.

== Legislative Council and later activism ==
As a member of the Legislative Council, Hope advocated for Tobago's interests, including the need for a more reliable steamer service between the islands and an improved wharf in Scarborough. He raised issues with the agricultural credit system, in which planters could access loans at 6% interest through the Agricultural Bank, while peasant farmers paid 12% interest on loans obtained from agricultural credit societies.

Hope was an integrationist who advocated closer ties between Trinidad and Tobago. He saw Tobago's problems as similar to those faced by rural parts of Trinidad and believed a stronger central government would be better positioned to address these issues. He supported unemployment relief and affordable healthcare for children. He served on the board of Bishop's High School, Tobago.
