= 1946 Trinidad and Tobago general election =

- 1 July 1946
- 13 seats in the Legislative Council; 7 seats needed for a majority
Party	Leader	Vote %	Seats
United Front	Albert Gomes	23.39	3
Butler Party	A. P. T. James	22.31	3
TUCSP		17.21	2
Independents	–	29.63	1
This lists parties that won seats. See the complete results below.
Results by constituency

General elections were held in Trinidad and Tobago on 1 July 1946, alongside local elections. The Butler Party and the United Front won three seats each. Voter turnout was 53%.

== Results ==
Party	Votes	%	Seats
United Front	37,891	29.39	3
Butler Party	28,767	22.31	3
Trades Union Congress and Socialist Party	22,191	17.21	2
Trinidad Labour Party	1,356	1.05	0
Progressive Democratic Party	515	0.40	0
Independents	38,198	29.63	1
Total	128,918	100.00	9
Valid votes	128,918	93.88	
Invalid/blank votes	8,408	6.12	
Total votes	137,326	100.00	
Registered voters/turnout	259,512	52.92	
Source: EBCTT, Caribbean Elections

=== Elected members ===
Constituency	Member	Party
Caroni	Clarence Abidh	Trades Union Congress and Socialist Party
Eastern Counties	Victor Bryan	Trades Union Congress and Socialist Party
North Port of Spain	Albert Gomes	United Front
St George	Chanka Maharaj	British Empire Citizens' and Workers' Home Rule Party
St Patrick	Timothy Roodal	British Empire Citizens' and Workers' Home Rule Party
San Fernando	Roy Joseph	United Front
South Port of Spain	Patrick Solomon	United Front
Tobago	A. P. T. James	British Empire Citizens' and Workers' Home Rule Party
Victoria	Ranjit Kumar	Independent
Source: La Guerre & Girvan
