= James Biggart =

Tobagonian politician and pharmacist (1878–1932)

Member of the Legislative Council of Trinidad and Tobago
- In office 1925–1932
- Preceded by: none
- Succeeded by: Isaac Hope
- Constituency: Tobago

Personal details
- Born: James Alpheus Alexander Biggart; 1878 Tobago
- Died: 1 August 1932 (aged 53–54) Trinidad and Tobago
- Party: Independent

James Alpheus Alexander Biggart (1878 – 11 August 1932) was a Tobagonian pharmacist who represented Tobago in the Legislative Council of Trinidad and Tobago from 1925 until his death in 1932. He was the first Black pharmacist in Tobago and the first person elected to represent Tobago on the Legislative Council.

== Early career ==
Biggart began work as an assistant druggist in 1892. The process involved apprenticing under private doctors and government medical officers who then wrote letters to his education and experience. One of his supervisors, E. Gerard Blanc, described Biggart as "painstaking, apt, and very intelligent pupil who made considerable progress in a short time". By 1899, Biggart owned the only pharmacy in the Windward district of Tobago, and was the only pharmacist in Tobago who had completed training in practical and theoretical chemistry at the government laboratory in Trinidad.

In 1889, Tobago was united with Trinidad under a single administrative unit under the Governor of Trinidad. Tobago's status was further downgraded to that of a ward in 1899, and Trinidadian law was applied to Tobago. Tobagonian law did not require pharmacists to be licensed, but under Trinidadian law they had to pass a licensing examination set by the Medical Board. Biggart attempted to take the licensing examination in Scarborough in 1900, but the examination was cancelled, forcing him to travel to Trinidad if he wanted to take the examination.

Biggart petitioned the Secretary of State for the Colonies in 1903 to be allowed to take the licensing examination in Tobago. Biggart argued that requiring him to travel to Trinidad put an unfair burden on him because of the cost, especially since he had applied to take the examination in Tobago in 1900. The administration of Governor Hubert Jerningham had promised "reasonable considerations" for the inhabitants of Tobago when it became a ward, and Biggart argued that he should either be granted an exemption from the licensing requirement, or he should be given the opportunity to take the examination in Tobago. The medical board decided to allow Biggart to take the examination in Tobago, but that in doing so said they were not setting a precedent.

Historian Learie Luke suggests that this experience may have led to Biggart's willingness to become involved in politics and advocate for his fellow Tobagonians.

== Early political activity ==
As part of the process to reduce administrative costs, Governor John Robert Chancellor abolished the office of Clerk of the Peace in Tobago in 1919. The duties formerly performed by the Clerk of the Peace were combined with those of the Magistrate. A group of 47 prominent Tobagonians including Biggart petitioned the Secretary of State for the Colonies, Viscount Milner, to have these duties given to a different official to avoid a potential conflict of interest with the Magistrate, who would be hearing the case. While Milner did not do this, he asked Chancellor to report to him on how well the system worked.

== Electoral career ==
=== 1925 elections ===
In 1925, the Legislative Council was expanded from 21 to 25 members, including seven elected members, including one member who was elected to represent Tobago. This gave Tobago its first elected representatives since 1877, when Crown colony government had been instituted. Voting was limited to literate men who were 21 or older, and came with property and income requirements. Requirements for candidates were even higher. The elections took place on 7 February 1925. Only 5.9% of the population were eligible to vote, and in Tobago only 547 out of 1,800 actually voted.

Biggart contested the election as an independent candidate, running against the labour-endorsed candidate, Isaac Hope, who was supported by Captain Arthur Andrew Cipriani and the Trinidad Workingmen's Association. In his campaign Biggart promised infrastructural improvements including an extension to the Scarborough jetty, the construction of a new jetty at Roxborough, the construction of a secondary school in Tobago, and the establishment of a daily transportation link between Tobago and Trinidad. Biggart won the election and became the first elected representative for Tobago on the Legislative Council.

=== 1928 elections ===
In the 1928 elections Biggart defeated Sam F. Bonnett, (Note: Jerome Teelucksingh refers to the opposing candidate as "Sam F. Bonnett" in the body of the book, but "A. Bonnett" in the appendix.) another labour-supported candidate, winning 361 votes to Bonnett's 55.

== Legislative council ==
Biggart served on the legislative council from 1925 until his death in 1932. Under the new constitution which had come into effect in 1924, the council consisted of 12 official members appointed by the governor, six unofficial members appointed by the governor, and seven elected members. The governor was a voting member of the council, and also had a casting vote which enabled him to break deadlocks. This meant that the official members were ensured a majority on the council.

On the legislative council, Biggart campaigned for the development of infrastructure and education in Tobago, and the improvement of communications by sea between the islands. Biggart campaigned for the establishment of a secondary school in Tobago, either a government school or a private denominational school supported by a grant from the government. In 1925 Bishop's High School was established in Tobago by the Anglican Church, and received support in the form of a government grant. By 1927 the school had 49 students enrolled and was affiliate with Queen's Royal College in Port of Spain. Biggart was also able to convince the government to restore the position of resident in Tobago, a position that had been abolished as part of the union between the two islands. He was also successful in his campaign to improve infrastructure in Tobago and improve communications between the islands.

Biggart's position as Tobago's representative on the Legislative Council made him not only the representative of Tobago's Black middle and working class, but also of the largely white planters and merchants whose traditional access to power had come through the Tobago Planters' Associate (TPA). Being represented by someone of African descent hurt the social standing of the planters. This prompted them to request their own representation on the Legislative Council, a move that was rejected by the Secretary of State for the Colonies.

== Legacy ==
Learie Luke put Biggart "just left of the mid-point of the autonomy continuum" from secessionist to integrationist, describing him as a separatist, who saw Tobago as having an identity and culture distinct from that of Trinidad. In Luke's assessment, Biggart set the stage for autonomists like A. P. T. James and A. N. R. Robinson who would represent Tobago in the middle and latter part of the twentieth century.
