= Progressive Democratic Party (Trinidad and Tobago) =

The Progressive Democratic Party was a political party in Trinidad and Tobago. It contested the 1946 general elections but received just 515 votes and failed to win a seat. It did not run in the 1950 elections, but returned for the 1956 elections. However, it again failed to win a seat, and did not contest any further national elections.
