= Caribbean Socialist Party =

Defunct political party in Trinidad and Tobago

The Caribbean Socialist Party was a political party in Trinidad and Tobago. Led by Patrick Solomon, it contested the 1950 general elections with the Butler Party, receiving 3% of the vote and winning a single seat, taken by A. P. T. James. It did not contest any further national elections.
