= All Trinidad Sugar Estates and Factory Workers Union =

Trade union in Trinidad and Tobago

All Trinidad Sugar Estates and Factory Workers Union (ATSEFWU), founded by Adrian Cola Rienzi was the major sugar workers' trade union and the predominant Indo-Trinidadian voice in organised labour in Trinidad and Tobago between the 1930s and 1970s. Leadership of the trade union passed from Rienzi to the Vice President, McDonald Moses, then Bhadase Sagan Maraj, and later to Krishna Gowandan.

== Background ==
In the aftermath of the 1937 labour riots in Trinidad and Tobago, the government established a mediation commission which gave official recognition to the Oilfields Workers' Trade Union, and paved the way for the recognition of the All Trinidad Sugar Estates and Factory Workers Union (Note: Knowles (1959) initially refers to it as the All Trinidad Sugar Workers Union, but later calls it the All Trinidad Sugar Estates and Factory Workers Union, without explaining the name change) and others that had been established out of the unrest.

== Establishment ==
All Trinidad was registered by Adrian Cola Rienzi in November 1937. The establishment was encouraged by governor Murchison Fletcher, whose support for trade unions led to his dismissal in the following year.

The ATSE/FWTU's initial membership consisted of two thousand sugar workers, which was only a small fraction of the thirty-four thousand sugar workers in the island. The union initially operated out of Rienzi's law office on Coffee Street, San Fernando, and shared its headquarters with the OWTU.

The Sugar Manufacturers Association, which represented the sugar estate and factory owners, refused to meet with All Trinidad until forced to by the government in February 1938. Despite the ongoing discussions, the SMA refused to recognise the union. After the outbreak of World War II, Governor Hubert Young created the Joint Sugar Board. In 1940 he forced an agreement between the SMA and the union, eventually leading to an interim agreement between the bodies.

In 1944 the SMA recognised the union, and the two signed their first agreement in 1945.

== Dissolution ==
The ATSEFWU was replaced by the All Trinidad Sugar and General Workers' Trade Union led by Basdeo Panday.

== See also ==
- List of trade unions

== Bibliography ==
- Knowles, William H. (1959). Trade Union Development and Industrial Relations in the British West Indies. University of California Press.
- Catchpole, F. C. (1955). "Report of a board of inquiry to inquire into the causes and circumstances of the dispute between the All-Trinidad Sugar Estates and Factories Worker's Trade Union and the Sugar Industry Labour Union : Appointed 21st September, 1955". Port of Spain, Trinidad: Government Printing Office.
