= Tubal Uriah Butler =

Grenadian-born Spiritual Baptist preacher and labour leader

Tubal Uriah "Buzz" Butler
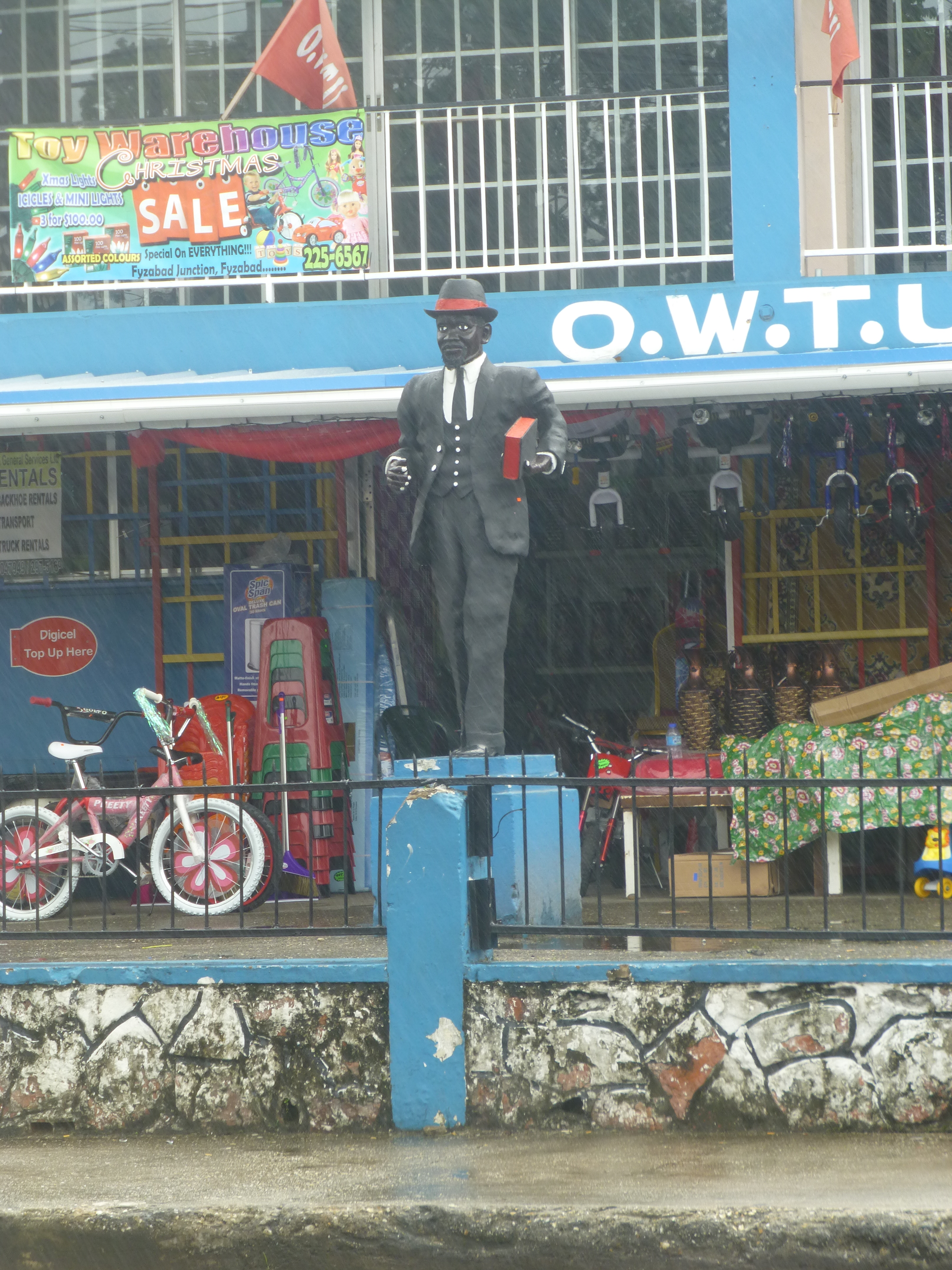
- A statue of Butler in Fyzabad
- Born: 21 January 1897; St. George's, Grenada
- Died: 20 February 1977 (aged 80); Fyzabad, Trinidad and Tobago
- Occupations: Preacher and labour leader

Tubal Uriah "Buzz" Butler (21 January 1897 – 20 February 1977), was a Grenadian-born Spiritual Baptist preacher and labour leader in Trinidad and Tobago. He is best known for leading a series of labour riots between 19 June and 6 July 1937 and for forming a series of personalist political parties (the British Empire Citizens' and Workers' Home Rule Party, the Butler Home Rule Party, and finally the Butler Party) that focused its platform on the improvement of the working class.

== Biography ==
Butler was born in St. George's, Grenada, where he attended the Anglican School. Unable to find work after completing his primary school education, at 17 he became a volunteer in the British West Indies Regiment in World War I, serving in the British Army from 1914 to 1918, stationed in Egypt. Returning from military service at the end of the war in 1918, he became active in political pressure groups and workers unions, establishing the Grenada Representative Government Movement, and the Grenada Union of Returned Soldiers. In 1921, aged 24, he went to south Trinidad and was employed at the Roodal Oilfields as a pipe-fitter. He became influenced by the philosophy of Marcus Garvey, according to Garvey's son Dr Julius Garvey.

Butler first came to prominence in 1935 when he led a "hunger march" from the oilfields to Port of Spain. In 1936 he was expelled from the Trinidad Labour Party for his "extremist tendencies". He then formed the British Empire Citizens' and Workers' Home Rule Party. On 19 June 1937 a strike in protest of working conditions, wages, racism and exploitation began in the oilfields in the southern Trinidad. Police attempted to arrest Butler as he addressed a meeting in Fyzabad. His supporters prevented the police from doing so and Charlie King, a police officer was killed. The Labour riots of 1937 resulted in turmoil throughout the oilfields. When strikes spread to the sugar factories, the Colonial government responded by issuing an arrest warrant for Butler. Butler went into hiding and the colonial authorities were unable to locate him. He stayed in contact with the authorities through Adrian Cola Rienzi and although he was promised safe passage by the colonial authorities to testify at a commission of enquiry into the events of June 1937, he was arrested by the colonial government when he emerged to do so.

Butler was imprisoned from 9 September 1937 to May 1939. With the outbreak of World War II in September 1939, he was re-arrested and detained for the duration of the war. After release from prison he formed the Butler Home Rule Party, which later became the Butler Party. The Butler Party captured the largest block of seats in the Legislative Council, but the Governor chose to exclude Butler and instead Albert Gomes became the first chief minister.

In the 1956 General Elections the Butler Party only won two seats. Butler, the fiery radical, was deemed too unstable and threatening to the nation's economic well-being by Eric Williams and the People's National Movement.

Butler is looked upon as the founding father of the Oilfields Workers' Trade Union (OWTU) and the labour movement and is honoured with a statue in Fyzabad. He was awarded the Trinity Cross, the nation's highest honour, in 1970.

== Legacy ==
The Uriah Butler Highway is named in his honour.
