= Trade Union Council =

The Trade Union Council was a political party in Trinidad and Tobago. It contested the 1950 general elections, receiving 4.8% of the vote but failing to win a seat. The party did not contest any further elections.
