= All Trinidad General Workers' Trade Union =

Trade union in Trinidad and Tobago

ATSGWTU
- All Trinidad Sugar and General Workers' Trade Union
- Predecessor: All Trinidad Sugar Estates and Factory Workers Union
- Founded: 1978
- Headquarters: Rienzi Complex, Couva, Trinidad and Tobago
- Location: Trinidad and Tobago
- Members: Approx 2,000 (2006)
- Key people: Nirvan Maharaj, President General
- Affiliations: NATUC, ITUC

The All Trinidad General Workers' Trade Union (ATGWTU, until 2007 All Trinidad Sugar and General Workers' Trade Union (ATSGWTU)) is a trade union in Trinidad and Tobago. It was founded in 1937 (as the All Trinidad Sugar Estates and Factory Workers Union by the first President General Adrian Cola Rienzi) to represent workers in the sugar industry, but expanded its scope in 1978 to include workers in a variety of sectors.

Due to the closing of the government company, Caroni (1975) Ltd., in 2003 by the Trinidad and Tobago government, the ATSGWTU has lost around 10,000 members. The union is restructuring and attempting to focus on continued growth and development. The union has changed its name to the All Trinidad General Workers' Trade Union (ATGWTU) in 2007 because of a loss of the country's sugar industry.

Basdeo Panday, the former prime minister of Trinidad and Tobago, was the president of the ATSGWTU from 1973 until his appointment as prime minister in 1995.

The ATGWTU is affiliated with the International Trade Union Confederation, National Trade Union Centre of Trinidad and Tobago and the Trinidad & Tobago Blind Welfare Association.

== List of President Generals ==
- Adrian Cola Rienzi (1932-1946)
- Lionel Frank Seukeran (1946-1955)
- McDonald Moses (1955-1957)
- Bhadase Sagan Maraj (1957-1971)
- Krishna Gowandan (1971-1973)
- Basdeo Panday (1973-1995)
- Boysie Moore-Jones (1995-1999)
- Rudranath Indarsingh (1999-2012)
- Nirvan Maharaj (2012–present)

== See also ==
- List of trade unions
- All Trinidad Sugar Estates and Factory Workers Union

== Sources ==
- ICTUR; et al., eds. (2005). Trade Unions of the World (6th ed.). London, UK: John Harper Publishing. ISBN 0-9543811-5-7.
