= Butler Party =

The British Empire Citizens' and Workers' Home Rule Party, also known as the Butler Home Rule Party and more commonly as the Butler Party, were a series of political parties in Trinidad and Tobago organised by Tubal Uriah Butler.

== History ==
Butler founded the party in 1936 after he split from the Trinidad Labour Party. However, he spent most of the period between 1937 and 1945 in prison; he was arrested after the labour riots of 1937 and imprisoned until 1939. After being released, he was re-arrested in at the start of World War II in 1939 because he was seen as a security threat to one of the British Empire's main supplies of petroleum. After he was released from prison at the end of the war, Butler reformed the party to fight the 1946 general elections. It finished second in the vote, winning three seats. In the 1950 elections it emerged as the largest party after the United Front did not run. However, although it won six of the eighteen seats, the government was formed by Albert Gomes of the Party of Political Progress Groups. In the 1956 elections the party was reduced to two seats. The 1961 elections saw its share of the vote drop to just 0.4% and it lost both seats. In 1966 it received just 704 votes, after which it never contested another election.
