= Cedros, Trinidad and Tobago =

Cedros
- village
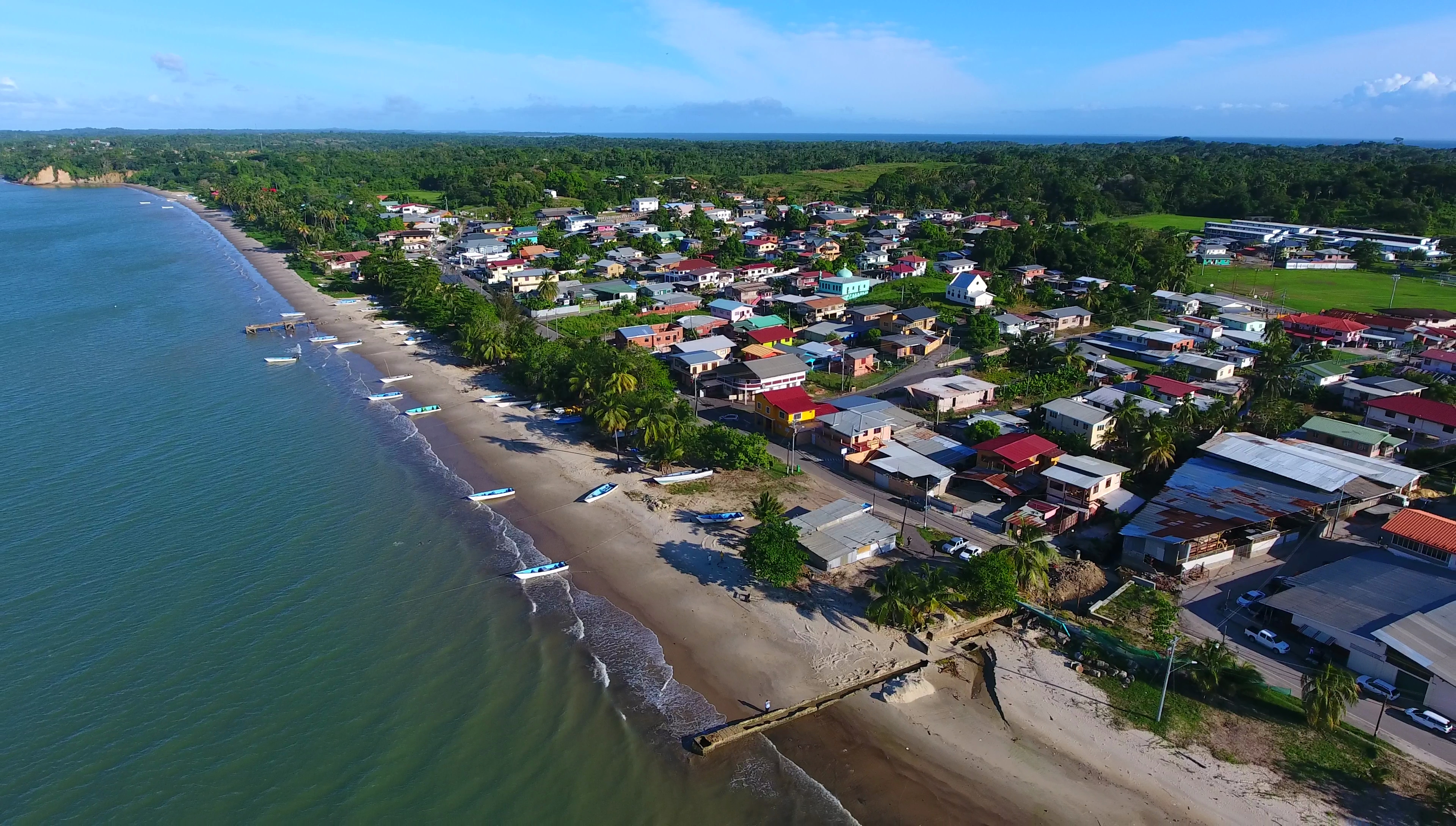
- Cedros
- Etymology: Spanish cedro (cedar)
- Cedros
- Coordinates: 10.093490°N 61.861931°W
- Country: Trinidad and Tobago
- Borough: Siparia

Government
  - Body: Siparia Borough Corporation

Population (2011)
  - Total: 1,508

Cedros is a coastal area that lies on a peninsula at the South-Western end of the island of Trinidad. Named by Spanish sailors due to the once heavy presence of cedar trees, it is located at the tip of the peninsula which lies mere miles off the coast of Venezuela and is the most southern point in the Caribbean. The main area is known as Bonasse which is of French origin meaning "easy-going."

Cedros is the closest legal point of entry to Venezuelans wishing to enter Trinidad and Tobago.

== Economic history ==
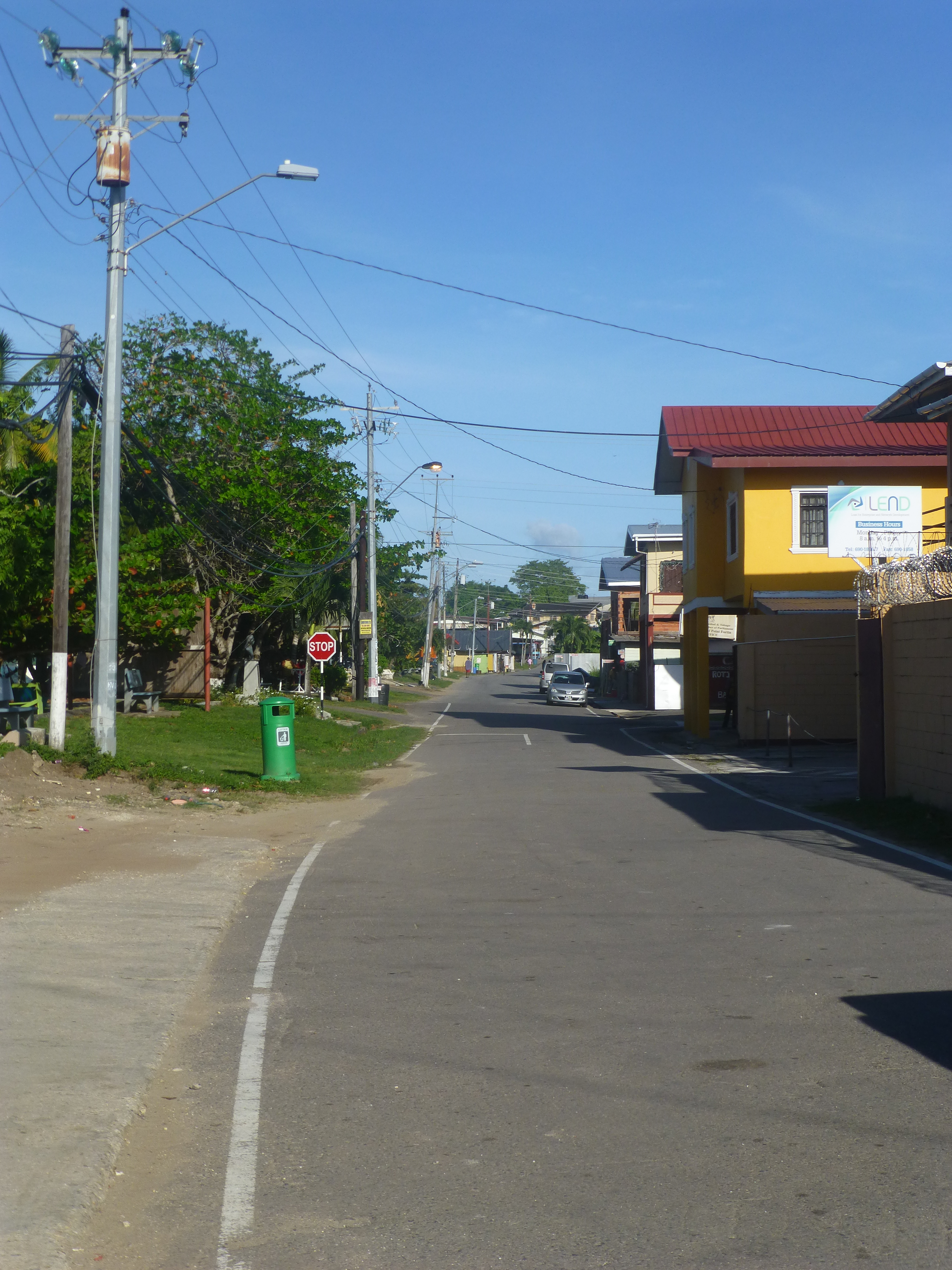
Southern Main Road in Cedros

Cedros has historically been a fishing village and coconut grove, producing much of the coconuts for harvest. In the 1800's, several estates were producing cotton but switched to sugar with seven distilleries across several sugar estates in operation with rum being the main export. Activity in Cedros increased due to the introduction of the Gulf Steamer in 1818 which connected Bonasse to the main towns of San Fernando and Port of Spain.

After the Slavery Abolition Act on 1 August 1834, many of the estates went bankrupt in the 1840s which led to the experimentation into other crops such as Bananas, Cotton, Cocoa, Coffee, Corn, Citrus and ground provisions. Coconuts were found to be the most economically successful with the exportation of copra and coconut oil.

The "Hurricane of 1933" measuring 120km/ph destroyed most of the southern peninsula which led to the demise of several estates. Most coconut trees were replanted but was devastated over the decades as they were infected by several types of diseases such as the Cedros Wilt Disease (Hartrot), Bronze Leaf Wilt, Bursaphelenchus cocophilus causing Red Ring disease, and the Red Palm Mite.

Today, small scale coconut harvesting, fishing and light tourism from mainly Venezuelan visitors are the main economic activities. Several estates have been repurposed for private real estate development with many in the area concerned that historical artifacts on these estates would be lost.

The proximity of Cedros to the South American mainland has led to many drug cartels from South America trying to bring their cargoes via the Gulf of Paria into the Caribbean region or though Cedros. As a countermeasure to suppress the drug trade using Venezuela, the Venezuelan government routinely sends gunships to patrol the waters between Trinidad and Tobago and Venezuela. With Cedros being a key area, countermeasures were done by the Government of Trinidad and Tobago include a jetty for quickly launching boats for drug interdiction and the installation of a 360 Degree Radar at Green Hill, Galfa.

== Geography ==
Widely considered on the island as a rural area, Cedros is considered to be one of the final remaining areas that only a few thousands of years ago attached the island of Trinidad geologically to the South American continent. Cedros is said to still share resemblance to the adjacent Venezuelan coastline 11–12 km across the passage of water known as Boca del Sierpe (Serpent's Mouth).

== Villages ==
Cedros comprises many villages developed and undeveloped, some of which were once thriving coconut and sugar estates: Bonasse (main community), Bamboo, Fullarton, Perseverance, Lochmaben, Columbia, St. Marie, Lans Vieusse (L'Envieusse) and Galfa.

Fullarton Village was named after the British Army Colonel, William Fullarton.

Bonasse Village which occupies the "Union" sugar estate was named after one of its plantation owners Jean Baptiste Bonnasse. Under Spanish rule, Bonasse was comprised off three smaller districts known as the Torre, Consedor, and Quorge.

Columbia Estate was named in honor of Christopher Columbus who docked at Los Gallos Point on 2 August 1498.

Several streets were named after former estates such as Union Street, St. Marie Road, St. John Road, Fullerton Road, Columbia Road and St. Quintin Road. Other streets were named after the proprietors of the estates such as Gardieu Street and Hughes Street. Some streets were named after British aristocratic figures such as George Street, Charles Street, Henry Street, Edward Street and King Street.

== Places of interest ==
On weekends, persons tend to drive down to Cedros to either bathe in the sea, purchase fish for consumption, enjoy the scenery or to participate in hikes and other nature events. Various groups conduct hikes over various geographical terrain in Cedros and neighboring Icacos at different times in the year. Hikes are usually offered to the public by a public hiking group for a fee.

=== Cedros Bay ===
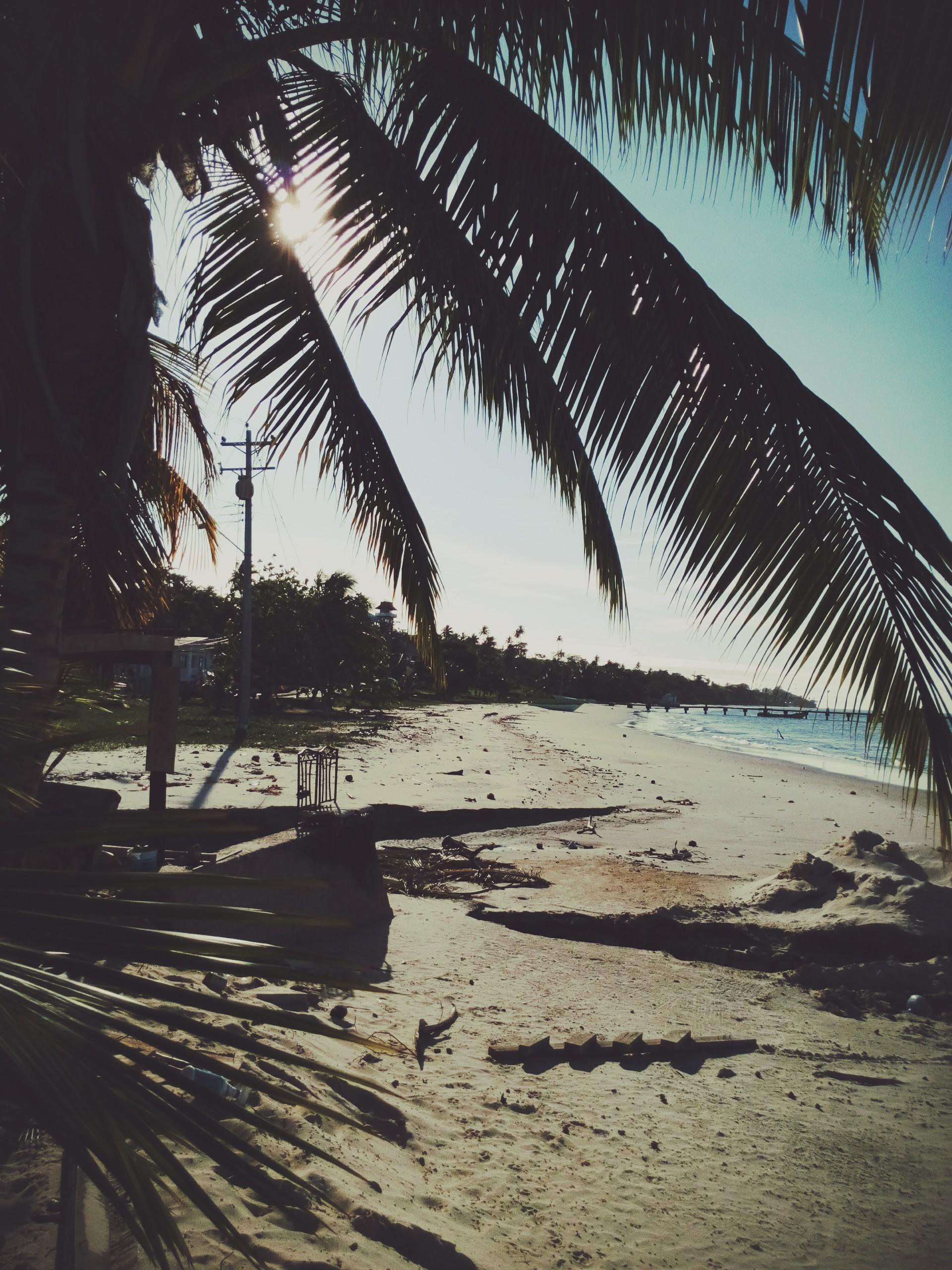
Beach at Cedros

Cedros Bay is a large stretch of beach with coconut trees along the shore of the bay with the villages of Bamboo, Bonasse and Fullerton overlooking the sea. The beach is excellent for walking and exercising while the waters tend to be more muddy than clear.

=== Green Hill Bunkers ===
Located at Green Hill in Galfa, the Green Hill Bunkers was once a 300-acre American Military Base built in 1941 during World War II to monitor the Gulf of Paria and the Columbus Channel against German aggression. With the war ending in 1945, the installation was discontinued in 1949.

=== Mystery Tombs ===
Located on L'Envieusse Estate are two mystery tombs over 200 years old surrounded by broken Scottish ballast bricks. It was eventually suspected to be the graves of two French planters, Jean and Michel Cavalan.

=== Mud Volcanoes ===
Mud volcanoes that exist in Cedros are Columbia, Lam Vierge and the popular Balka Devi which is revered by the local Hindu population.

=== Manmohansingh Park ===
Public space located in Bonasse Village overlooking the sea.

=== Cedros Public Cemetery ===
Cedros Public Cemetery has simple and elaborate tombs and grave spots. On some of the grave spots, the boundaries of which are marked off by bricks, there is indication of recent maintenance in the white paint. However, there are one or two which have an elaborate gravestone, along with information which has been carved into the tombstone.

It is the practice of holders of grave spots in cemeteries to bury their close relatives one on top of the other with a few feet of dirt between each person after a number of years have passed. Some grave holders rent spots in different parts of the cemetery either as the spaces become available or as the family grows and the spots are used or as the finances of the family changes, whichever comes first. Given the terrain of most areas, it is practical to select spots in different locations to take account of expansion of the cemetery and or the wishes of parents with respect to burial.

=== Cedros Secondary School ===
Cedros Composite School is located in "Bonasse Village, Trinidad"

=== Oil fields ===
There are shallow onshore oil deposits located in Cedros however, they are currently being explored. The only producing oil field is located in Bonasse that was discovered in 1911.

=== Cedros Public Library ===
The Cedros Public Library is located in the Cedros Composite School according to the NALIS website. Thus the Public Library falls under the Authority of the National Library Information System even though it is housed in a school compound. As there has been an expansion in the services which the Public Library offers, some of which are: free internet access on computers for an hour per day for a person, access to books online and access to research facilities once a person joins a Library and signs up for the service, there should be an increase in borrowings from the Cedros area with the availability of services in the Library.

== Smelter ==
In 2005–06, the Government of Trinidad and Tobago led by the then Prime Minister of T&T – Patrick Manning announced an initiative to rapidly industrialize the Cedros area. One of the projects devised for Cedros was the establishment of an Alumina smelter plant which was backed by ALCOA. Residents living in the Cedros area opposed the project. The plant was touted as becoming one of the biggest alumina smelter plants in the world once completed; however, residents in Cedros claimed that ash from the plant could contaminate the local area's soil and may lead to possible respiratory-health issues in the long run. The Smelter project was cancelled in September 2010.

== Notable native of Cedros ==
- Cyrus Prudhomme David (1867-1923, lawyer)
- Mervyn Dymally (1926-2012, politician)
