= Oilfields Workers' Trade Union =

Trade union in Trinidad and Tobago

Oilfields Workers' Trade Union OWTU
- Founded: 25 July 1937; 88 years ago
- Headquarters: San Fernando, Trinidad and Tobago
- Location: Trinidad and Tobago
- Members: 11000
- Key people: Ancel Roget, President General
- Affiliations: ICEM; FITUN
- Website: archive.owtu.org

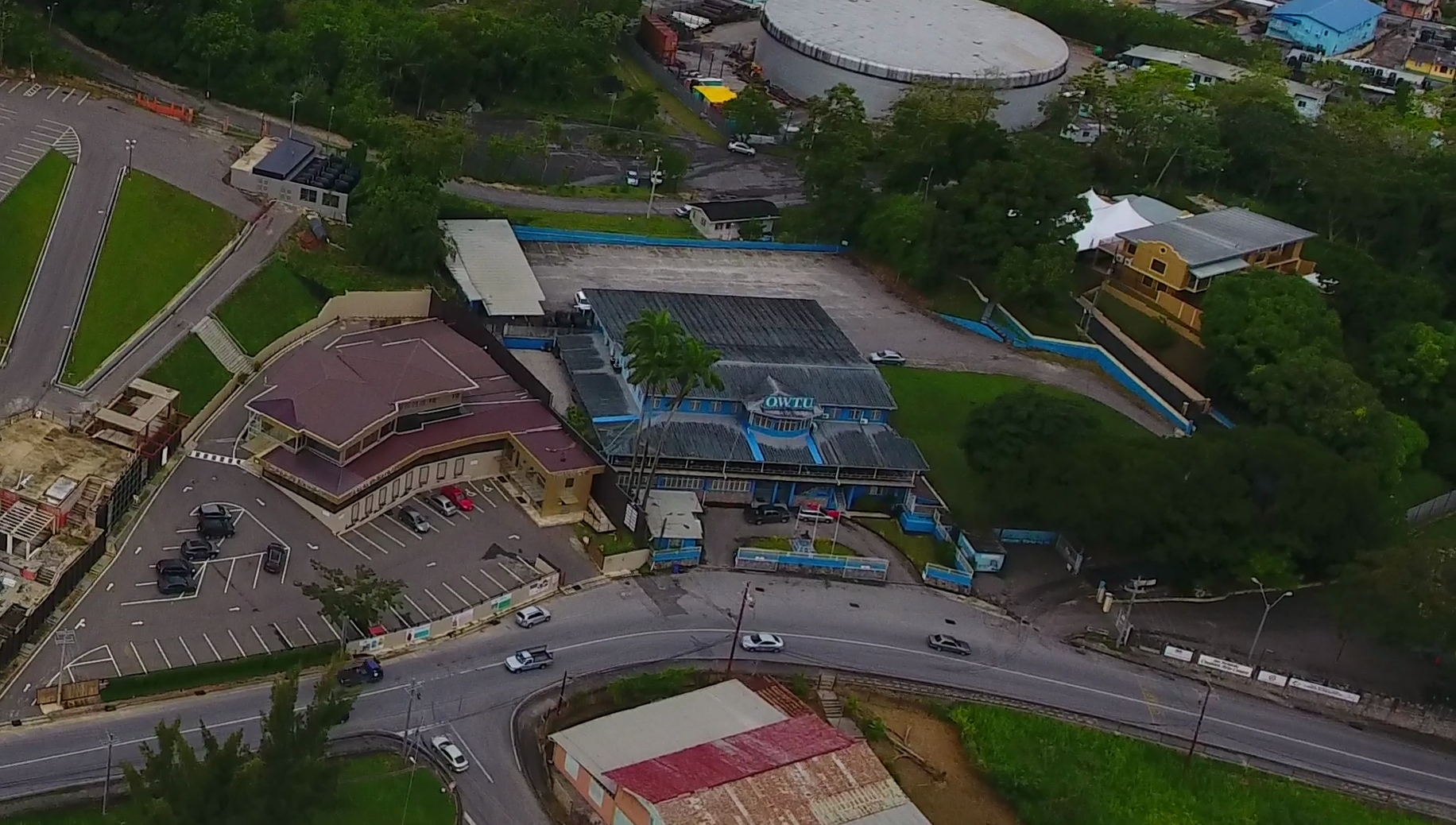
OWTU headquarters, San Fernando

The Oilfields Workers' Trade Union (OWTU) is one of the most powerful trade unions in Trinidad and Tobago. Currently led by Ancel Roget, the union was born out of the 1937 labour riots, the union was nominally led by the imprisoned TUB Butler but was actually organised by lawyer Adrian Cola Rienzi.

== History ==
=== 1937–1943: Adrian Cola Rienzi Presidency ===
The union was established on 25 July 1937, and formally registered on 15 September. The first meetings were held in Fyzabad, and the first official headquarters were established on Coffee Street, San Fernando. The first official meeting of the Union was held on 15 July 1937, at Mr. Williams quarters, Coon Town, Forest Reserve, Fyzabad. The first officers elected to office were Caleb Roach, chairman, McDonald Moses, Vice President, E. R. Blades, Secretary and E. Bennet, Treasurer. The OWTU was formally established just days later on 25 July 1937, at its Founding Conference, held at Saltfish Hall, Mucurapo Street in San Fernando. The Union was registered on 15 September 1937.

With Butler having to go into hiding after 19 June, due to a warrant for his arrest on sedition and treason charges, a leader emerged – Adrian Cola Rienzi – who became the Union's first President General. Rienzi also became the first President of the All Trinidad Sugar Estates and Factory Workers' Trade Union (ATSEFWTU). At the same time, McDonald Moses was made Vice President of both the OWTU and the ATSEFWTU unions. The OWTU's first Central Office established at 16 Coffee Street in San Fernando was also shared by the ATSEFWTU. The Blue Shirt uniform for which the OWTU is well known has been worn since the 1930s.

From the mid-1930s, workers began to express their discontent through increasingly militant actions. Unemployment was high and wages which were low were reduced even as the employer class sought to ensure that they lost little in the face of the global economic crisis precipitated by the Wall Street crash of 1929 and the Great Depression that followed. In addition to the many issues related to the poor working and social conditions which prevailed, these struggles also had a very important political dimension. The workers were also struggling against colonialism as evidenced by their call for "Home Rule". They knew that achieving independence would be a means to improving the conditions that they were then facing.

In this period of heightened mobilization against these injustices, a leader emerged – Tubal Uriah "Buzz" Butler. Under his leadership the strike began on 19 June 1937 – the day Trinidad and Tobago commemorates today as Labour Day. The strike soon spread throughout Trinidad and involved all major sectors of workers (dockworkers, sugar workers, cocoa estate workers, railway workers and store workers) in the island. The uprising lasted until 2 July, and the colonial authorities required the intervention of British troops from two battleships the Exeter and the Ajax to quell the protests. During this strike, 14 people died, including that of policeman, Charlie King, hundreds were injured and many persons were arrested.

=== 1943–1962: John F.F. Rojas Presidency ===
Under John F.F. Rojas leadership the OWTU became a founding member of the World Federation of Trade Unions.

=== 1962–1987: George Weekes Presidency ===
In the 1960s and 1970s, under the leadership of George Weekes, the union grew into a potent political force, playing a role in the Black Power movement in 1970 and playing a role in the foundation of the United Labour Front. This was the most powerful of the mass actions that were taking place across the Caribbean, as the working class throughout the region were taking a stand and making their voices heard as they struggled against the poor working conditions which they were experiencing. At the same time, the vast majority of workers faced social conditions such as very poor housing, inadequate health care, the lack of educational opportunities and racial discrimination, among other ills.

=== 1987–2008: Errol K. McLeod Presidency ===
Championed the Occupational Safety and Health Act.
