= Trades Union Congress and Socialist Party =

The Trades Union Congress and Socialist Party was a political party in Trinidad and Tobago. It contested the 1946 general elections, receiving 17.2% of the vote and winning two of the nine seats, Clarence Abidh in Caroni and Victor Bryan in Eastern Counties. Although it finished second in the 1950 elections, the party's vote share fell to 10.5% and it was reduced to a single seat. The party did not contest any further elections.
