= United Front (Trinidad and Tobago) =

The United Front was a political party in Trinidad and Tobago. It received the largest share of the vote (29.4%) in the 1946 general elections (the first held under universal suffrage) and won three of the nine seats. However, the party did not contest any further elections.
