= Water Riots =

1903 social unrest in Trinidad and Tobago

Trinidad and Tobago Water Riots
- Date: 23 March 1903
- Location: Port of Spain, Brunswick Square, Red House

Parties
Government of Trinidad and Tobago; Trinidad & Tobago Police	Rioteers

Casualties and losses
0	16 killed, 42 injured

The Water Riots took place in Port of Spain on 23 March 1903 in Trinidad and Tobago, then a British colony. As a result of the riots, the Red House, which was the seat of the Executive and Legislative Council was destroyed.

Around 1900, Trinidad had a high consumption of water. In 1874 the yearly water consumption per citizen was twice as high as in London. Following the building of national waterworks infrastructure, the Government passed an ordinance that increased the cost of water, enacting the installation of water meters in private homes. A number of public meetings had been held to protest against the increase, culminating in a demonstration on 23 March in Brunswick Square, located outside the Red House. Protesters threw rocks at the building, smashing windows (including a historical stained glass window commemorating the arrival of Christopher Columbus) and causing members of the legislature to hide under tables for protection. The protesters then set the lower floor on fire, at which time police opened fire on the crowd, killing sixteen people, and injuring forty-two others (including two teenagers and one child). The fire completely gutted the Red House.
