= Red House (Trinidad and Tobago) =

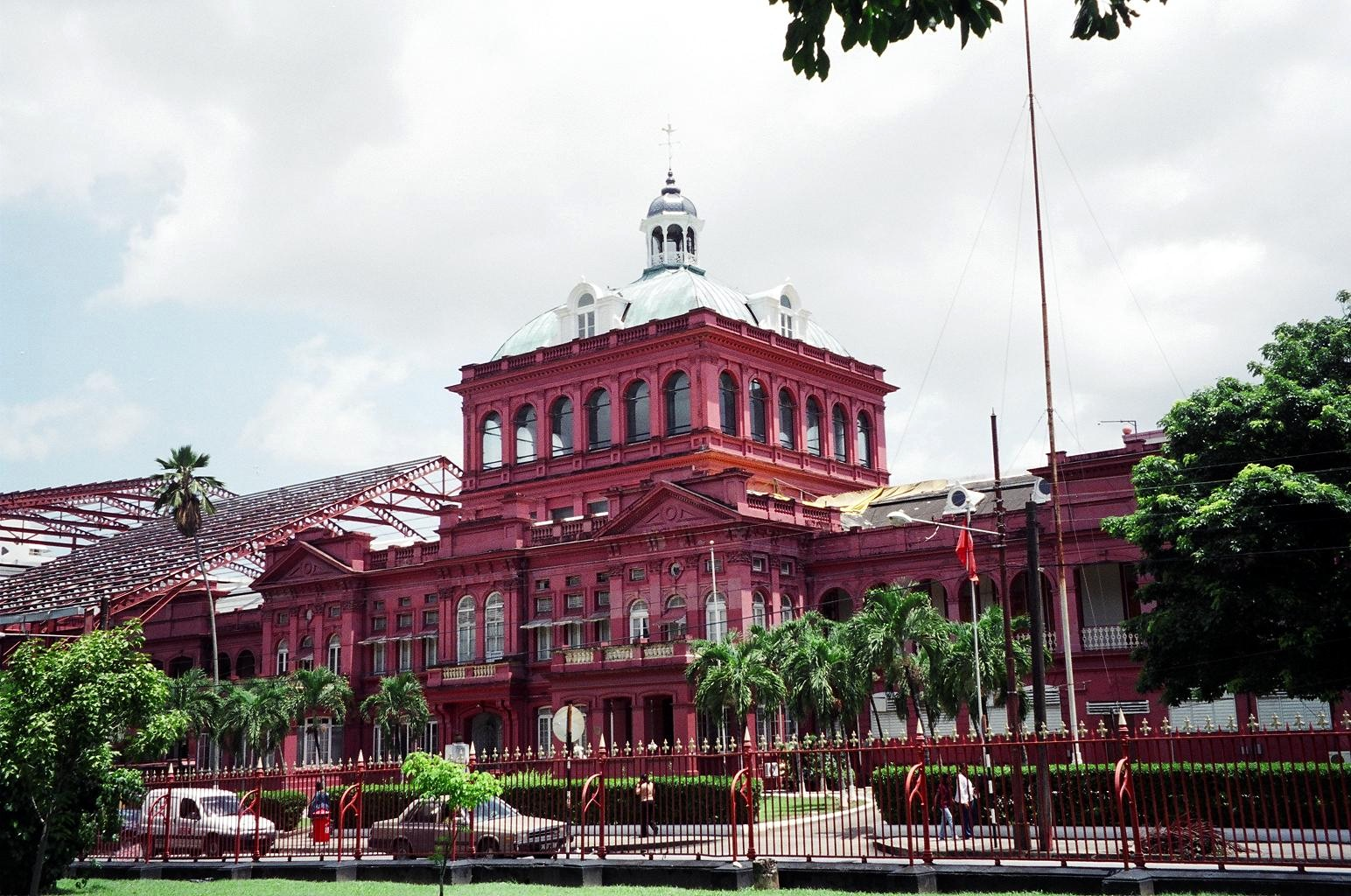
- The Red House, seat of Parliament

General information
- Location: Abercromby Street, Port of Spain, Trinidad and Tobago
- Coordinates: 10°39′11″N 61°30′42″W
- Completed: February 4, 1907; 119 years ago

Design and construction
- Architect: D. M. Hahn

The Red House is the seat of Parliament in Trinidad and Tobago. The architectural design of the Red House is of Beaux-Arts style. The original building was destroyed in the 1903 Water Riots and was rebuilt in 1907. The Red House is located centrally within the capital city Port of Spain. It is currently used as a meeting place for parliament and elections and for political uses.

In July 1990, the Red House was the site of the Jamaat al Muslimeen coup attempt, during which the Prime Minister and other members of the government were held hostage for six days and 24 people were killed.

== Original structure ==
On 15 February 1844, then Governor of Trinidad, Sir Henry McLeod, laid the foundation stone for a new government administration building on the western edge of the Woodford Square, then known as Brunswick Square.A few years later, switch to 1851 when Lord [Harris], the Governor, came back to power, he made what we know as the 'Red House' now, Trinidad's first public library. This building was to be constructed on eight privately owned parcels of land. Then Superintendent of Public Works, Richard Bridgens designed the building and it was constructed by contractors, Messrs G. de la Sauvagere and A. A. Pierre.

The building was to consist of a north and south blocks and connected by a double archway, much as the Red House of today. The double archway was a necessary architectural feature required by the City Council to keep patent Prince Street, as the buildings were constructed over this street. The Council stipulated that Prince Street should never be closed to the public and, pedestrian and wheeled traffic should pass freely. The southern block completed in 1848 contained the courts of law and the northern to colonial administration offices.

The buildings were slow to complete and, by 1892, they still were unfinished, as indicated by a quote within the newspaper, the Port of Spain Gazette:

"Nothing further had been done to complete the buildings since their erection some fifty years ago. The only attempt to relieve the monotony of the whole is to be seen in the arching of the carriageway through the courtyard which is a perfect skeleton and, like the ruins of Pompeii, is more suggestive of what the buildings must have been than of what they were intended to be."

After many alterations and additions the buildings were completed at a cost of £15,000.

== Fire ==
In 1897, as Trinidad was preparing to celebrate the Diamond Jubilee of Queen Victoria, the buildings were given a coat of red paint, and the public promptly referred to them thereafter as the Red House. This direct ancestor of the present Red House was burnt to the ground on 23 March 1903.

On the day of the fire, while a new ordinance regarding the distribution of and payment for water in the town was being debated in the Legislative Council, a protest meeting was held in Brunswick Square by the Ratepayer's Association, as there was much public dissatisfaction over certain clauses contained in the ordinance which increased the water rates. At the end of the meeting, the crowds became noisy and stones were thrown, and all the windows of the original Red House were smashed including a stained glass window in the chamber which was erected to commemorate the arrival of Christopher Columbus in Trinidad.

When a woman was arrested by a policeman, the mob became riotous. Stones were thrown into the Council Chamber and the Members were forced to protect themselves under tables and desks and behind the pillars. Still, the Governor, Sir Cornelius Alfred Moloney, refused to withdraw the Ordinance. When it became known that the lower storey of the building was on fire, the riot act was read, following which the police opened fire on the crowd. Sixteen people were killed and forty-two injured, and the Red House was completely gutted. After the fire, only the shell of the original Red House remained.

== Rebuilding ==
The work of rebuilding it began the following year, and the Red House, as it is known today, was erected on the same site. It was opened to the public on 4 February 1907 by Governor Sir Henry Moore Jackson.

The building was designed and built by D. M. Hahn, Chief Draughtsman of the Public Works, at an estimated cost of £7,485. This sum included the gesso work (a mixture of plaster of Paris and glue) in the Legislative Council Chamber and the Justice Hall, which was estimated at £7,200.

The work was completed in 1906. The ceiling is the most striking feature in the Chamber. It is Wedgwood blue with white gesso work and was the work of Messrs. Jackson & Sons, an English firm.

The decorations were made in England in panels, and shipped to Trinidad in crates. An Italian craftsman was sent to install the ceiling.

The entablature and dais at the eastern end were also designed by D. M. Hahn. The columns and entablature are made of purpleheart, while the panelling is fustic. The passageway between the two buildings which replaced the double archway, is no longer open to vehicular traffic. The fountain in the centre of the rotunda was designed by D. M. Hahn as a means of cooling and ventilation for the offices, in the days before air-conditioning.

The offices of the early Red House, with the exception of the Governor's office and that of the Colonial Secretary, comprised offices for the Attorney-General, Registrar-General Lands & Surveys Department, Judges' Chambers, the Courts of Justice and the Parliament and Law Libraries, as well as the Legislative Council Chamber, which is now the Parliament Chamber. At present, the building is being restored for the exclusive use of the Parliament.

The Red House today is the second Government building to be known by this name since the newly constructed government offices were built on the same site and given the same name. The name Brunswick Square was changed to Woodford Square during World War I from 1914 to 1918. The rubble which was removed after the fire was used as landfill for Victoria and Harris Squares.
