= Saint Patrick County =

Coordinates: 10.1507°N 61.5852°W

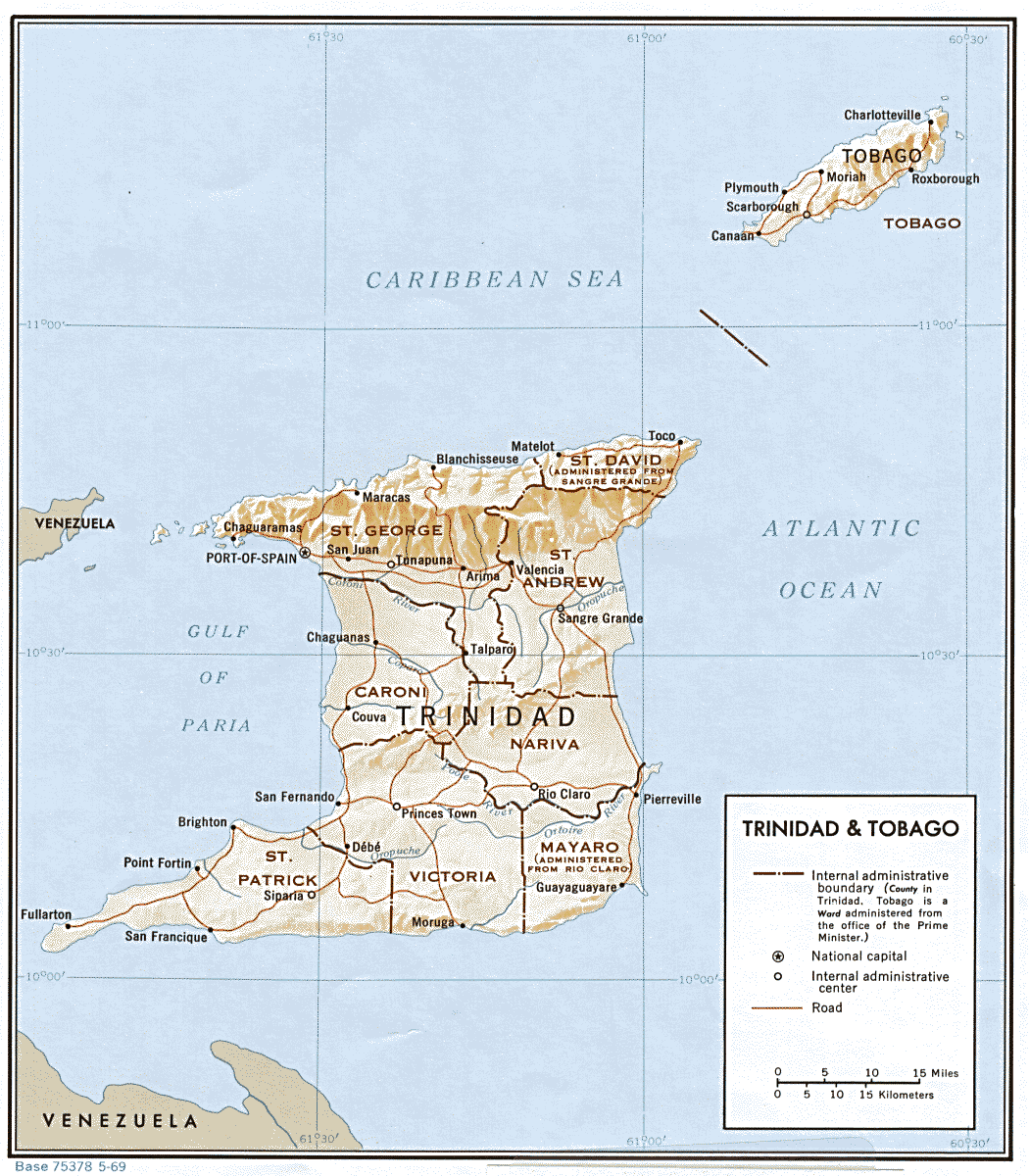
Map showing old counties of Trinidad

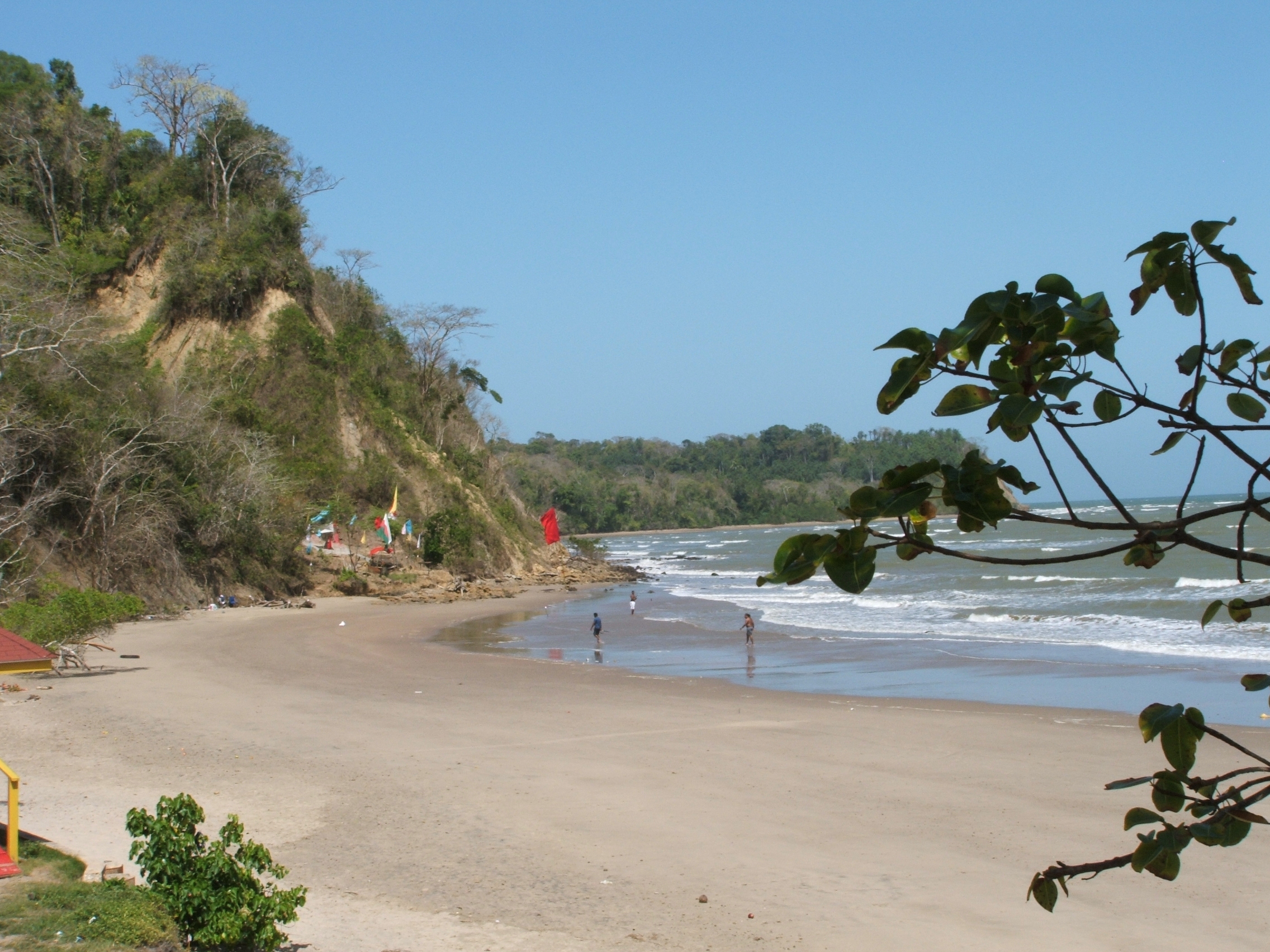
Quinam Bay, St. Patrick

Saint Patrick was a county in Trinidad and Tobago that occupied an area of 673 km^{2} (260 sq mi). It occupied the southwestern peninsula of the island of Trinidad, bounded by the Columbus Channel to the south, the Gulf of Paria to the west, and Victoria to the north. It included the towns of Point Fortin, La Brea, Siparia, Cedros, Fyzabad and Penal. Saint Patrick was divided into four Wards: Cedros, La Brea, Erin and Siparia.

Prior to 1990, local government was administered by the Saint Patrick County Council and the Point Fortin Borough Corporation. After 1990, areas formerly administered by the Saint Patrick County Council were divided between Penal–Debe Regional Corporation and Siparia Regional Corporation.
