= Victoria County, Trinidad and Tobago =

County of Trinidad and Tobago

Coordinates: 10.263°N 61.453°W

Victoria was a county on Trinidad island in Trinidad and Tobago.

The county of Victoria was named in honour of Queen Victoria during the colonial period.

== Geography ==
Victoria County covers 813 km^{2} (314 mi^{2}).

The county is bordered on the north by Caroni County, the south by Saint Patrick County, and in the east by Mayaro County and Nariva County. To the west its shores are on the Gulf of Paria.

The county is divided into five wards:

- Pointe-à-Pierre
- Naparima
- Savanna Grande
- Ortoire
- Moruga

The major towns in Victoria County include:

- San Fernando
- Princes Town
- Debe
- Barrackpore

== Local government ==
Prior to 1990 local government was administered by the Victoria County Council and the San Fernando City Corporation (the San Fernando Borough Council prior to 1988).

After 1990, areas formerly administered by the Victoria County Council were divided between the Princes Town Regional Corporation, Couva–Tabaquite–Talparo Regional Corporation, and the Penal–Debe Regional Corporation.
