= Caroni County =

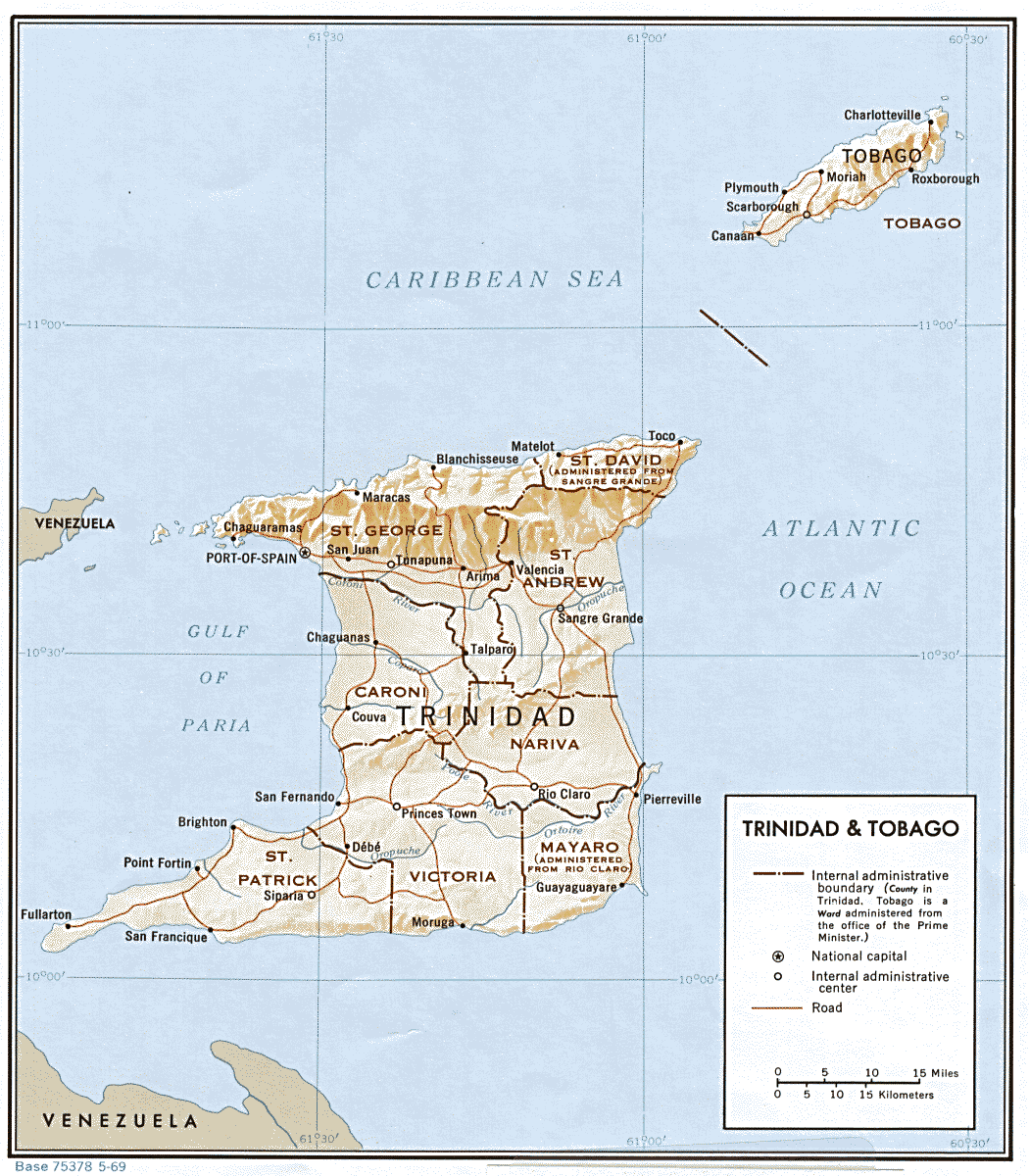
Map showing old counties of Trinidad

Caroni County was a historic county of Trinidad and Tobago. It occupies 557 km^{2} (215 sq mi) in the west central part of the island of Trinidad, the larger island in the Republic of Trinidad and Tobago. It lies south and southwest of Saint George County, west of Nariva County and north of Victoria County. To the west it is bounded by the Gulf of Paria. County Caroni includes the towns of Chaguanas, the largest town (by population) in the country and Couva, the capital of the Couva–Tabaquite–Talparo region. Administratively it is divided between the Borough of Chaguanas, the Region of Couva–Tabaquite–Talparo and the Region of Tunapuna–Piarco. The county was divided into four Wards: Chaguanas, Couva, Cunupia and Montserrat. The major towns of County Caroni are Chaguanas and Couva. The port and industrial zone of Point Lisas is located in Caroni, and the region is also a site for agriculture.

Caroni County, which takes its name from the Caroni River, stretches from the hills of the Central Range into the lowlands of the Caroni Plains and the Caroni Swamp. It is heavily associated with sugar cane and the "sugar belt", but it actually accounts for no more than one third of the sugar belt. The now-defunct state-owned sugar company, Caroni (1975) Ltd, took its name from the county.

Caroni is often used symbolically to represent the Indo-Trinidadian heartland and the power base of the United National Congress.

There are two waterfalls located in the Central Range in Caroni County, Brasso Venado Falls in Brasso Venado and Carmelita Falls in Gran Couva. These are the only two waterfalls in Central Trinidad.

Prior to 1990 local government was administered by the Caroni County Council.

After 1990 areas formerly administered by the Caroni County Council were divided into the regions of Couva, Tabaquite–Talparo, Tunapuna, Piarco and the Borough of Chaguanas. In 1992, Couva and Tabaquite–Talparo merged to form Couva–Tabaquite–Talparo and Tunapuna and Piarco merged to form Tunapuna–Piarco.
