= Trinidad Labour Party =

Political party in Trinidad and Tobago

- Dissolved: 1957
- Merged into: Democratic Labour Party

The Trinidad Labour Party was a political party in Trinidad and Tobago. Formed in 1934 when the Trinidad Workingmen's Association changed its name, it was the country's first party.

== History ==
The party was originally a trade union named the Trinidad Workingmen's Association. Its leader Arthur Andrew Cipriani was elected to the Legislative Council in the 1925 elections. It was renamed the Trinidad Labour Party in 1934, becoming the country's first political party. The party's ambition was to reform the colony's system from within through a series of gradual improvements for workers. However, economic problems caused by the Great Depression made progress difficult. The Butler Party was established by the more radical Tubal Uriah Butler, and took over from the TLP as the main voice of the islands' workers. The Butler Party supported strikes and riots in the 1930s, whilst the Labour Party opposed them.

In the 1946 general elections, the first held under universal suffrage, the Labour Party received just 1.1% of the vote and failed to win a seat. In the 1950 elections its vote share rose to 7.9% and it won two seats. For the 1956 elections it ran as the Trinidad Labour Party-National Development Party and retained both seats. In 1957 it merged into the Democratic Labour Party.

The party was resurrected for the 1981 elections, but received just 34 votes and failed to win a seat. It did not contest any further elections.
