= Arthur Andrew Cipriani =

Trinidad and Tobago politician

- Born: 31 January 1875; Port of Spain, Trinidad
- Died: 18 April 1945 (aged 70); Port of Spain, Trinidad and Tobago
- Education: Saint Mary's College, Trinidad and Tobago
- Occupations: Labour leader and politician
- Known for: Leader of the Trinidad Workingmen's Association (TWA) and founder of the Trinidad Labour Party

Captain Arthur Andrew Cipriani (31 January 1875 – 18 April 1945) was a Trinidad and Tobago labour leader and politician. He served as mayor of Port of Spain, elected member of the Legislative Council, leader of the Trinidad Workingmen's Association (TWA) and founder of the Trinidad Labour Party.

== Early life ==
Arthur Andrew Cipriani was born in Port of Spain, Trinidad, in 1875, one of three sons of Albert Henry Cipriani, a planter from Santa Cruz. The Cipriani family were a White Trinidadian family of Corsican descent. In his biography, author and historian C. L. R. James describes the Cipriani family as "closely related" to the Bonaparte family. Cipriani's father died when he was very young, and after the death of his mother from typhoid fever when he was six, he was raised by his paternal aunt. He attended St. Mary's College in Port of Spain between the ages of seven and 16.

After leaving school, Cipriani tuned down the opportunity to train as a veterinarian. Instead, he chose to work as a jockey and racehorse trainer, and was elected secretary of the Trinidad Breeders' Association. In addition, he worked on the cocoa estates belonging to relatives and family friends.

== World War I ==
He was involved with recruiting soldiers at the outbreak of World War I and was subsequently made a captain with the British West Indies Regiment, leaving for the front in 1917.

== Post-war ==
Impressed by how the West Indians adapted to the business of modern war, he concluded that the West Indian people were capable of doing their own self-government. On his return to Trinidad, he became a leader not just to the ex-soldiers but to labourers as well, his followers being both working-class Afro-Trinidadians and Indi-Trinidadians.

In 1919, he was elected President of the Soldiers and Sailors Union, an organization that promoted the interests of the ex-servicemen. He also joined the Trinidad Workingmen's Association (TWA), of which he became president in 1923. Under his leadership, the TWA increased its membership and political influence, becoming the main organization through which workers' grievances were articulated.

== Elected office ==
From 1926 to 1941, Cipriani was a Port of Spain City Councillor and was elected Mayor on eight occasions. In 1925, he was elected as a representative to the Trinidad and Tobago Legislative Council and served as a member for Port of Spain until his death in 1945.

In 1934, Cipriani helped to rename the TWA as the Trinidad Labour Party.

== Death and legacy ==
He died on 18 April 1945.

C. L. R. James wrote The Life of Captain Cipriani: An Account of British Government in the West Indies, which was published in 1932 with financial assistance of the Trinidadian cricket player Learie Constantine. An abridged version was published as The Case for West Indian Self-Government by Leonard and Virginia Woolf's Hogarth Press in 1933.

A statue in memory of Cipriani was unveiled on 17 April 1959 in Port of Spain by Eric Williams, who declared on the occasion: "Captain Cipriani is the pioneer of the nationalist movement of Trinidad and Tobago. With the unveiling of this statue we commemorate our own historical development, our own positive action, our own native history made by native hands, and the aspiration of our native peoples."

The Cipriani College of Labour and Co-operative Studies is named after him.
