= Legislative Council of Trinidad and Tobago =

The Legislative Council of Trinidad and Tobago served as an advisory commission to the governor in British-ruled Trinidad and Tobago, between 1831 and independence in 1962. The Legislative Council consisted of a mixture of appointed and elected members. After the introduction of elected representation in 1925 the council consisted of 13 "unofficial" members (those who were not civil servants serving ex officio in the council), seven elected and six appointed. Over time the balance between elected members and appointed members changed. In 1956, the council consisted of 24 elected and 7 appointed unofficial members.

From 1950, the council served as a unicameral legislature.

== Background ==
Between 1797 and 1925, Trinidad was directly ruled by Britain as a crown colony with no elected representation. This was unlike the situation in the rest of the British West Indies where an elected Assembly was the norm. While there was a Council of Advice, which was later replaced by a Council of Government and finally by an Executive and Legislative Council, these were purely advisory bodies and had no elected representation. Following an investigative visit to the Caribbean by Major E. F. L. Wood (Parliamentary Under-Secretary of State for the Colonies) between December 13, 1921 and February 14, 1922, a recommendation was made to include elected members.

The Treaty of Capitulation of 18 February 1797 surrendered control of Spanish-administered Trinidad to the British. The treaty protected the property rights of the population, and guaranteed that the "free coloured people...shall be protected in their liberty, persons and property, like other inhabitants".

In 1801 the first British governor, Sir Thomas Picton, established a Council of Advice which was renamed His Majesty's Council in 1803. In 1831, this purely advisor council was replaced with the Council of Government, the first legislative council.

== Elections ==
The first elections to the Legislative Council were held in 1925. Voting rights were based on property or income qualifications. The colony was divided into seven constituencies:

- the city of Port of Spain
- the county of Caroni
- the county of St. George
- the Eastern Counties (St. Andrew, St. David, Nariva and Mayaro)
- the county of Victoria
- the county of St. Patrick
- the ward of Tobago
