= List of MPs for constituencies in Tobago =

This is a list of members of parliament (MPs) elected to the House of Representatives of Trinidad and Tobago by Tobagonian constituencies to represent them nationally in the Parliament of Trinidad and Tobago. There are currently two constituencies that represent the autonomous ward of Tobago in the House of Representatives: Tobago East and Tobago West.

From the first general elections held in the colony in 1925 till independence, the whole island of Tobago was represented in the Legislative Council of Trinidad and Tobago with one constituency named Tobago. The two constituencies of Tobago East and Tobago West were created by the Boundaries Commission prior to the 1961 Trinidad and Tobago general election before independence from the United Kingdom in 1962. Although Tobago did not have a large enough voting population to justify the division, the commission determined that it would be best represented by two Members of Parliament. This is reflected in Part IV, section 70 of the 1976 Constitution which requires Tobago to have at least two constituencies.

The list is sorted by the name of the MP.

== Current MPs ==
MP	Constituency	Party	In constituency since
David Thomas	Tobago East	TPP	2025
Joel Sampson	Tobago West	TPP	2025

== MPs 2015-2025 ==
MP	Constituency	Party	In constituency since	Majority	Majority (%)
Ayanna Webster-Roy	Tobago East	PNM	2015	7,951	69.48%
Shamfa Cudjoe	Tobago West	PNM	2015	10,679	79.20%

== Former MPs ==
=== Tobago East ===
Election	Years	Member	Party	Notes
1961	4 December 1961 – 13 September 1976	Arthur N.R. Robinson	PNM	
1976	13 September 1976 – 9 November 1981	Arthur N.R. Robinson	DAC	
1981	9 November 1981 – 15 December 1986	Pamela Nicholson	DAC	
1986	15 December 1986 – 11 December 2000	Arthur N.R. Robinson	NAR	
2000	11 December 2000 – 10 December 2001	Nathaniel Moore	NAR	
2001	10 December 2001 – 5 November 2007	Eudine Job-Davis	PNM	
2007	5 November 2007 – 24 May 2010	Rennie Dumas	PNM	
2010	24 May 2010 – 7 September 2015	Vernella Alleyne-Toppin	TOP	

=== Tobago West ===
Election	Years	Member	Party	Notes
1961	4 December 1961 – 13 September 1976	Benjamin Pitt	PNM	
1976	13 September 1976 – 9 November 1981	Winston Murray	DAC	
1981	9 November 1981 – 15 December 1986	James Ogiste	DAC	
1986	15 December 1986 – 11 December 2000	Pamela Nicholson	NAR	
2000	11 December 2000 – 24 May 2010	Stanford Callender	PNM	
2010	24 May 2010 – 7 September 2015	Delmon Baker	TOP	

== See also ==
- List of Trinidad and Tobago MPs
