= Politics of Trinidad and Tobago =

The politics of Trinidad and Tobago function within the framework of a unitary state regulated by a parliamentary democracy modelled on that of the United Kingdom of Great Britain and Northern Ireland, from which the country gained its independence in 1962. Under the 1976 republican Constitution, the monarch was replaced as head of state by a President chosen by an electoral college composed of the members of the bicameral Parliament, consisting of the Senate and the House of Representatives.

The country has remained a member of the Commonwealth, and has retained the Judicial Committee of the Privy Council in London as its highest court of appeal. The general direction and control of the government rests with the Cabinet, led by a Prime Minister. The Prime Minister and Cabinet are answerable to the House of Representatives. The 41 members of the House are elected to terms of at least five years. Elections may be called earlier by the president at the request of the prime minister or after a vote of no confidence in the House of Representatives. In 1976, the voting age was reduced from 21 to 18. The Senate's 31 members are appointed by the President: 16 on the advice of the prime minister, six on the advice of the leader of the opposition, and nine independents selected by the President from among outstanding members of the community. Local government is through nine Regional Corporations and five municipalities. Tobago was given a measure of self-government in 1980 and is governed by the Tobago House of Assembly. In 1996, Parliament passed legislation which gave Tobago greater self-government. In 2005 Parliament approved a proposal by the independent Elections and Boundaries Commission to increase the number of seats in the House of Representatives from 36 to 41.

Party politics has generally run along ethnic lines, with most Afro-Trinidadians supporting the People's National Movement (PNM) and most Indo-Trinidadians supporting various Indian-majority parties, such as the current United National Congress (UNC) or its predecessors. Most political parties, however, have sought to broaden their purview. In the run-up to the 2007 general election, a new political presence emerged called Congress of The People (COP). Led by Winston Dookeran, the majority of this membership was formed from former UNC members. Despite gaining a significant but minority share of the vote in various constituencies, the COP failed to capture a single seat.

An early general election was called on 16 April 2010, and was held on 24 May 2010. Two major entities contested the election: the incumbent PNM, and a coalition called the People's Partnership, led by UNC leader Kamla Persad-Bissessar, comprising the UNC, COP, Tobago Organisation of the People (TOP), and two labour and non-governmental organisations: the National Joint Action Committee and the Movement for Social Justice. The People's Partnership won 29 seats and the majority, with Kamla Persad-Bissessar being sworn in as the country's first female prime minister on 26 May 2010. The PNM won the remaining 12 seats and comprised the opposition in parliament.

After the period a new party also emerged from an ex-member of the United National Congress, known as the Independent Liberal Party which was founded by FIFA ex-vice president Jack Warner.

In the 2015 general election resulted in a victory for the People's National Movement, which won 23 of the 41 seats led by Keith Rowley. In August 2020, Prime Minister Keith Rowley’s ruling party PNM won the general election again. On March 17, 2025 Stuart Young was sworn in as Prime Minister after Dr Keith Rowley's resignation on March 16, 2025.

The 2025 Trinidad and Tobago general election resulted in a victory for the United National Congress with 26 seats won and 13 won by the PNM. A new party, the Tobago People's Party won the 2 seats in Tobago. Kamla Persad-Bissessar was sworn in as Prime Minister on May 1, 2025.

== Executive branch ==
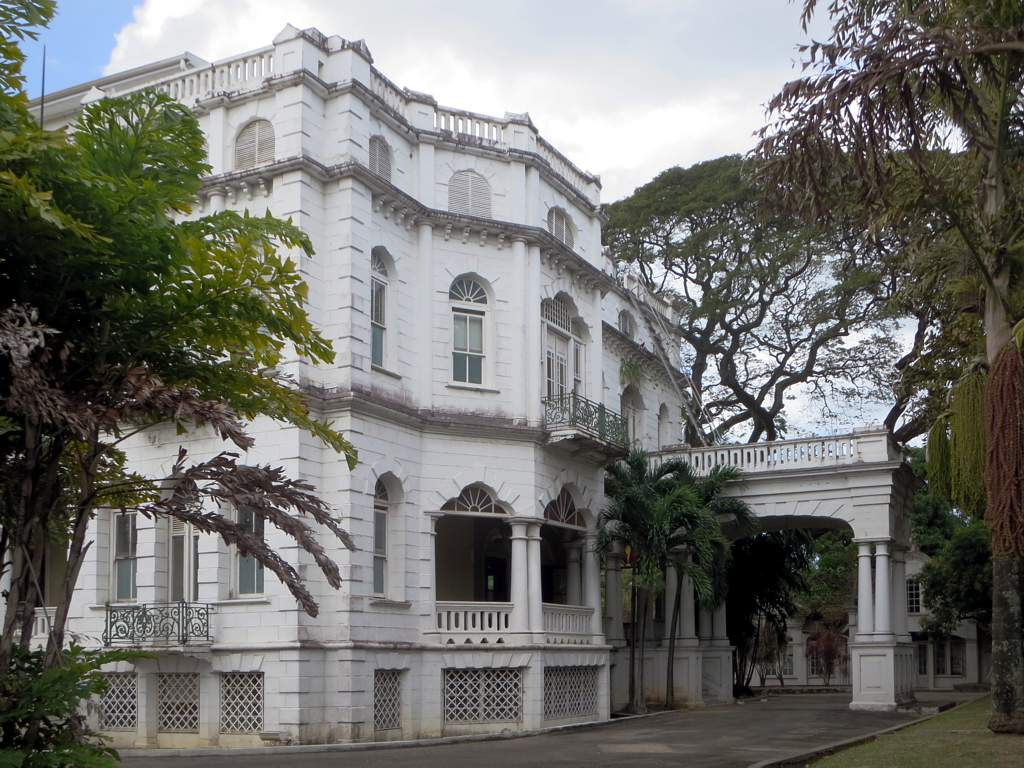
Whitehall, the official office of prime minister of Trinidad and Tobago

See also: List of prime ministers of Trinidad and Tobago

Main office-holders
Office	Name	Party	Since
President	Christine Kangaloo	Independent	20 March 2023
Prime Minister	Kamla Persad-Bissesar	United National Congress	1 May 2025

The president is elected by an electoral college, which consists of the members of the Senate and House of Representatives, for a five-year term. The prime minister is appointed by the president from among the members of Parliament; following legislative elections, the person with the most support among the elected members of the House of Representatives is appointed prime minister, usually the leader of the winning party. The cabinet membership consists of the prime minister, its head, the attorney general and any other minister chosen at the discretion of the prime minister from persons among the Members of Parliament, which constitutes elected Members of the House of Representatives and appointed Members of the Senate.

=== Cabinet since 2025 ===
Following the 2025 Trinidad and Tobago general election, the following cabinet was sworn in:

- Prime Minister: Kamla Persad-Bissessar
- Attorney General: John Jeremie
- Minister of Agriculture and Fisheries: Senator Ravi Ratiram
- Minister of Justice, Minister in the Ministry of the Attorney General: Devesh Maharaj
- Minister of Culture and Community Development: Michelle Benjamin
- Parliamentary Secretary in the Ministry of Culture and Community Development: Dr Narindra Roopnarine
- Minister of Defence: Wayne Sturge
- Minister of Education: Dr Michael Dowlath
- Minister of Energy and Energy Industries: Dr Roodal Moonilal
- Minister in the Ministry of Energy and Energy Industries: Ernesto Kesar
- Minister of Finance: Davendranath Tancoo
- Minister of Foreign and CARICOM Affairs: Sean Sobers
- Parliamentary Secretary in the Ministry of Foreign and CARICOM Affairs and Parliamentary Secretary in the Office of the Prime Minister: Nicholas Morris
- Minister of Health: Dr Lackram Bodoe
- Minister in the Ministry of Health: Dr Rishad Seecharan
- Minister of Homeland Security: Roger Alexander
- Minister of Housing: Dr David Lee
- Minister in the Ministry of Housing: Anil Roberts
- Minister of Labour, Small and Micro Enterprise Development: Leroy Baptiste
- Minister of land and Legal Affairs and Minister in the Ministry of Agriculture and Fisheries: Saddam Hosein
- Minister in the Office of the Prime Minister and Minister of Public Utilities: Barry Padarath
- Minister of the People, Social Development and Family Services: Vandana Mohit
- Parliamentary Secretary in the Ministry of the People, Social Development and Family Services: Dr Natalie Chaitan-Maharaj
- Minister of Planning, Economic Affairs and Development: Kennedy Swaratsingh
- Minister of Public Administration and Artificial Intelligence: Dominic Smith
- Minister in the Ministry of Public Utilities: Clyde Elder
- Parliamentary Secretary in the Ministry of Public Utilities: Shivanna Sam
- Minister of Rural Development and Local Government: Khadijah Ameen
- Minister of Sport and Youth Affairs: Phillip Watts
- Minister of Tertiary Education and Skills Training: Dr Prakash Persad
- Parliamentary Secretary in the Ministry of Tertiary Education and Skills Training: Hansen Narinesingh
- Parliamentary Secretary in the Ministry of Trade, Investment and Tourism: Colin Neil Gosine
- Minister of Transport and Civil Aviation: Eli Zakour
- Minister of Works and Infrastructure: Jearlean John

=== Cabinet until 2025 ===
Cabinet ministers of Trinidad and Tobago

- Prime Minister and Minister of Energy and Energy Industries: Stuart Young, MP
- Attorney-General: Camille Robinson-Regis, MP
- Minister of Finance: Senator Vishnu Dhanpaul
- Minister of National Security: Marvin Gonzales, MP
- Minister of Foreign and CARICOM Affairs: Senator Amery Browne
- Minister of Planning and Sustainable Development: Pennelope Beckles, MP
- Minister of Trade and Industry: Senator Paula Gopee-Scoon
- Minister of Tourism, Culture and the Arts: Senator Randall Mitchell
- Minister of Local Government and Rural Development: Faris Al Rawi, MP
- Minister of Agriculture, Lands and Fisheries: Senator Kazim Hosein
- Minister of Housing and Urban Development: Adrian Leonce, MP
- Minister of Works and Transport: Senator Rohan Sinanan
- Minister of Public Utilities: Colm Imbert, MP
- Minister of Public Administration: Senator Allyson West
- Minister of Digital Transformation and Minister in the Ministry of Finance: Senator Hassel Bacchus
- Minister of Health: Terrence Deyalsingh, MP
- Minister of Education: Nyan Gadsby-Dolly, MP
- Minister of Labour and Small Enterprise Development: Stephen McClashie, MP
- Minister of Social Development and Family Services: Senator Donna Cox
- Minister of Sports and Community Development: Shamfa Cudjoe, MP
- Minister of Youth Development and National Services: Foster Cummings, MP
- Minister in the Office of the Prime Minister (Gender and Child Affairs): Ayanna Webster-Roy, MP
- Minister in the Office of the Prime Minister (Communications): Symon de Nobrega, MP
- Minister in the Office of the Prime Minister: Fitzgerald Hinds, MP
- Minister in the Ministry of Finance: Brian Manning, MP
- Minister in the Office of the Attorney-General: Senator Renuka Sagramsingh-Sooklal
- Minister in the Ministry of Agriculture, Lands and Fisheries: Senator Avinash Singh
- Minister in the Ministry of Works and Transport: Senator Richie Sookhai
- Minister in the Ministry of National Security: Keith Scotland, SC, MP

Following the 2015 general elections, a number of ministries were removed, while others were consolidated or reintroduced.

Removed	Consolidated	Reintroduced
Ministry of the People	Ministry of Works and Transport (formerly Min Works and Infrastructure and Min Transport)	Ministry of Agriculture
Ministry of Gender	Ministry of Rural Development (formerly Local Government)	Ministry of Social Development
Ministry of Youth and Child Development	--	--
Ministry of Arts and Multiculturalism	--	--
Ministry of Justice	--	--
Ministry of Science, Technology and Tertiary Education	--	--
Ministry of Food Production	--	--
Ministry of Environment and Water Resources	--	--
Ministry of National Diversity and Social Integration	--	--

== Legislative branch ==
The Parliament of the Republic of Trinidad and Tobago has two chambers. The House of Representatives has 41 members, elected for a five-year term in single-seat constituencies. The Senate has 31 members: 16 Government Senators appointed on the advice of the Prime Minister, six Opposition Senators appointed on the advice of the Leader of the Opposition and nine Independent Senators appointed by the President to represent other sectors of civil society. The 15 member Tobago House of Assembly has limited autonomy with respect to Tobago.

== Party division by Parliamentary session ==
The following tables lists the party divisions for the House of Representatives and Tobago House of Assembly. Note that numbers in boldface denote the majority party at that particular time while italicized numbers signify a House in which the majority party changed intra-term.

Session	Election	PNM	UNC						Total seats
12th Republic	Monday, August 10, 2020	**22**	19						41
Session	Election	PNM	UNC	COP					Total seats
11th Republic	Monday, September 7, 2015	**23**	17	1					41
Session	Election	PNM	UNC	COP	TOP				Total seats
10th Republic	Monday, 24 May 2010	12	**21**	**6**	**2**				41
Session	Election	PNM	UNC						Total seats
9th Republic	Monday, 5 November 2007	**26**	15						41
8th Republic	Monday, 7 October 2002	**20**	16						36
7th Republic	Monday, 10 December 2001	**18**	**18**						36
Session	Election	PNM	UNC		NAR				Total seats
6th Republic	Monday, 11 December 2000	16	**19**		1				36
Session	Election	PNM	UNC		NAR				Total seats
5th Republic	Monday, 6 November 1995	17	**17**		**2**				36
4th Republic	Monday, 16 December 1991	**21**	13		2				36
Session	Election	PNM	NAR						Total seats
3rd Republic	Monday, 15 December 1986	3	**33**						36
Session	Election	PNM	ULF		DAC				Total seats
2nd Republic	Monday, 9 November 1981	**26**	8		2				36
1st Republic	Monday, 13 September 1976	**24**	10		2				36
Session	Election	PNM							Total seats
3rd Independent	Monday, 24 May 1971	**36**							36
Session	Election	PNM	DLP						Total seats
2nd Independent	Monday, 7 November 1966	**24**	12						36
1st Independent	Monday, 4 December 1961	**20**	10						30
Session	Election	PNM		PDP	TLP-TND		BP	Independent	Total seats
9th Legislative Council	Monday, 24 September 1956	**13**		5	2		2	2	24
Session	Election	CSP	POPPG		TLP	TUCSP	BP	Independent	Total seats
8th Legislative Council	Monday, 18 September 1950	1	2		2	1	6	6	18
Session	Election	UF				TUCSP	BP	Independent	Total seats
7th Legislative Council	Monday, 28 October 1946	3				2	3	1	9
Session	Election				TLP	UP		Independent	Total seats
6th Legislative Council	Early 1938				3	2		2	7

=== Tobago House of Assembly ===
Session	Election	PNM	PDP	Independent	Total seats
12th	Monday, 6 December 2021	1	1	**13**	15
12th	Monday, 6 December 2021	1	**14**		15
11th	Monday, 25 January 2021	6	6		12
10th	Monday, 23 January 2017	**10**	2		12
Session	Election	PNM			Total seats
9th	Monday, 21 January 2013	**12**			12
Session	Election	PNM	TOP		Total seats
8th	Monday, 19 January 2009	**8**	4		12
Session	Election	PNM	DAC		Total seats
7th	Monday, 17 January 2005	**11**	1		12
Session	Election	**PNM**	NAR		Total seats
6th	Monday, 29 January 2001	**8**	4		12
Session	Election	PNM	NAR	Independent	Total seats
5th	Monday, 9 December 1996	1	**10**	1	12
4th	Monday, 7 December 1992	1	**11**		12
3rd	Tuesday, 29 November 1988	1	**11**		12
Session	Election	PNM	DAC		Total seats
2nd	Monday, 26 November 1984	1	**11**		12
1st	Monday, 24 November 1980	4	**8**		12

== Partisan control of Parliament ==
This table shows the number of Parliaments in which a party controlled the House of Representatives and Tobago House of Assembly.

Party	Parliament	Prime Ministers
PNM	10	5
UNC	2	2
NAR	1	1
No overall control	2	

=== Tobago House of Assembly ===
Party	Assembly	Chief Secretaries
PNM	5	3
NAR	3	3
DAC	2	1
PDP	1	1
Independent	1	1
No overall control	1	

== Judicial branch ==
The country's highest court is the Court of Appeal of Trinidad and Tobago, whose chief justice is appointed by the president after consultation with the Prime Minister and Leader of the Opposition. The current Chief Justice of Trinidad and Tobago is Ronnie Boodoosingh who replaced Ivor Archie on 22nd October 2025. Final appeal on some matters is decided by the Judicial Committee of the Privy Council in London. Trinidad and Tobago was chosen by its Caribbean neighbours (Caricom) to be the headquarters site of the Caribbean Court of Justice (CCJ) which was supposed to replace the Judicial Committee of the Privy Council in the fall of 2003. However, the government has been unable to pass legislation to effect this change.

== Administrative divisions ==
Trinidad is divided in five Municipalities Arima, Chaguanas, Port of Spain, Point Fortin, San Fernando and nine Regional Corporations Couva–Tabaquite–Talparo, Diego Martin, Penal–Debe, Princes Town, Mayaro–Rio Claro, San Juan–Laventille, Sangre Grande, Siparia, and Tunapuna–Piarco.

Local government in Tobago is handled by the Tobago House of Assembly.

== International organization participation ==
ACP, C, Caricom, CDB, ECLAC, FAO, G-24, G-77, IADB, IBRD, ICAO, ICCt, ICRM, IDA, IFAD, IFC, IFRCS, IHO, ILO, IMF, IMO, Intelsat, Interpol, IOC, ISO, ITU, ITUC, LAES, NAM, OAS, OPANAL, OPCW, UN, UNCTAD, UNESCO, UNIDO, UNU, UPU, WCO, WFTU, WHO, WIPO, WMO, WTO

== See also ==
- List of prime ministers of Trinidad and Tobago
- Attorney General of Trinidad and Tobago
- Chief Justice of Trinidad and Tobago
- Elections in Trinidad and Tobago
- Parliament of Trinidad and Tobago
- List of political parties in Trinidad and Tobago
