= Tobago West =

Parliamentary Constituency

- Constituency for the Parliament of Trinidad and Tobago
- Electorate: 23,674 (2015)

Current constituency
- Created: 1961
- Number of members: 1
- Member of Parliament: Joel Sampson (TPP)
- Created from: Tobago

Tobago West is a parliamentary electoral district in Trinidad and Tobago, comprising the western part of Tobago. It is currently represented by Joel Sampson.

This constituency was created by the Boundaries Commission prior to the 1961 Trinidad and Tobago general election. Although Tobago did not have a large enough voting population to justify the division, the Commission determined that it would be best represented by two Members of Parliament. This is reflected in Part IV, section 70 of the 1976 Constitution which requires Tobago to have at least two constituencies.

== Members of Parliament ==
This constituency has elected the following members of the House of Representatives of Trinidad and Tobago:

Election	Years	Member	Party	Notes
1961	4 December 1961 – 13 September 1976	Benjamin Pitt	PNM	
1976	13 September 1976 – 9 November 1981	Winston Murray	DAC	
1981	9 November 1981 – 15 December 1986	James Ogiste	DAC	
1986	15 December 1986 – 11 December 2000	Pamela Nicholson	NAR	
2000	11 December 2000 – 24 May 2010	Stanford Callender	PNM	
2010	24 May 2010 – 7 September 2015	Delmon Baker	TOP	
2015	7 September 2015 – 18 March 2025	Shamfa Cudjoe	PNM	
2025	3 May 2025 – present	Joel Sampson	TPP	

== Election results ==
=== Elections in the 2020s ===
2025 Trinidad and Tobago general election: Tobago West
Party	Candidate	Votes	%	±%
TPP	Joel Sampson	6,713	46.7%	new party
PNM	Shamfa Cudjoe	6,604	45.9%	▼20.84
PDP	Curtis Douglas	608	4.2%	▼28.45
PF	Aretha Paula Clarke	154	1.1%	Steady
All People's Party (Trinidad and Tobago)	Dexter James	87	0.6%	Steady
Innovative Democratic Alliance	Kay Trotman	82	0.7%	Steady
CARM	Ricardo Phillip	61	0.4%	Steady
UTP	Nickosy Phillips	37	0.3%	Steady
Independent	Leroy George	38	0.3%	Steady
Majority		109	0.8%	
Turnout		14,379	49.82%	
Registered electors		28,863		
TPP gain from PNM		Swing	%	

General election 2020: Tobago West
Party	Candidate	Votes	%	±%
PNM	Shamfa Cudjoe	9,202	66.74	
Independent	Ricardo Sammy Phillip	43	0.31	
PDP	Tashia Grace Burris	4,502	32.65	
UTP	Nickocy Darias D Phillips	40	0.29	
Majority		4,700	34.09	
Turnout		13,787	49.8	
PNM hold		Swing		

=== Elections in the 2010s ===
General election 2015: Tobago West
Party	Candidate	Votes	%	±%
PNM	Shamfa Cudjoe	10,609	79.20	
ILP	Paul Johnny Peters	62	0.46	
TOP	Ann Natasha Seconds	766	5.72	
TF	Christlyn Nathalia Moore	1,602	11.99	
The Platform of Truth	Hochoy Alexander Charles	357	2.66	
Majority		9,007	67.24	
Turnout		13,396	51.23	
PNM gain from TOP		Swing		
