= Tobago East =

Parliamentary Constituency

- Constituency for the Parliament of Trinidad and Tobago
- Electorate: 20,424 (2015)

Current constituency
- Created: 1961
- Number of members: 1
- Member of Parliament: David Thomas (TPP)
- Created from: Tobago

Tobago East is a parliamentary electoral district in Trinidad and Tobago, comprising the eastern part of Tobago. It is currently represented by David Thomas of the Tobago People's Party.

This constituency was created by the Boundaries Commission prior to the 1961 Trinidad and Tobago general election. Although Tobago did not have a large enough voting population to justify the division, the Commission determined that it would be best represented by two Members of Parliament.

== Members of Parliament ==
This constituency has elected the following members of the House of Representatives of Trinidad and Tobago:

Election	Years	Member	Party	Notes
1961	4 December 1961 – 13 September 1976	Arthur N.R. Robinson	PNM	
1976	13 September 1976 – 9 November 1981	Arthur N.R. Robinson	DAC	
1981	9 November 1981 – 15 December 1986	Pamela Nicholson	DAC	
1986	15 December 1986 – 11 December 2000	Arthur N.R. Robinson	NAR	
2000	11 December 2000 – 10 December 2001	Nathaniel Moore	NAR	
2001	10 December 2001 – 5 November 2007	Eudine Job-Davis	PNM	
2007	5 November 2007 – 24 May 2010	Rennie Dumas	PNM	
2010	24 May 2010 – 7 September 2015	Vernella Alleyne-Toppin	TOP	
2015	7 September 2015 – 18 March 2025	Ayanna Webster-Roy	PNM	
2025	3 May 2025 – present	David Thomas	TPP	

== Election results ==
=== Elections in the 2020s ===
2025 Trinidad and Tobago general election: Tobago East
Party	Candidate	Votes	%	±%
TPP	David Thomas	7,144	57.0%	▲
PNM	Ayanna Webster-Roy	4,396	35.1%	▼
PDP	Watson Duke	788	6.3%	Steady
PF	Wade Caruth	99	0.8%	Steady
Innovative Democratic Alliance	Gerard Balfour	82	0.7%	Steady
Majority		2,748	21.9%	
Turnout		12,542	52.58%	
Registered electors		23,853		
TPP gain from PNM		Swing	%	

General election 2020: Tobago East
Party	Candidate	Votes	%	±%
PNM	Ayanna Webster-Roy	7,128	54.52	
OTV	Juliana Henry-King	80	0.61	
PDP	Watson Solomon Duke	5,866	44.87	
Majority		1,262	9.65	
Turnout		13,074	56.59	
PNM hold		Swing		
