= 1980 Tobago House of Assembly election =

- 24 November 1980

All 12 seats in the Tobago House of Assembly 7 seats needed for a majority
- Turnout: 66.24%
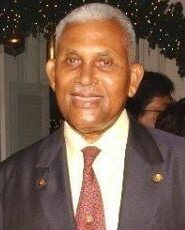

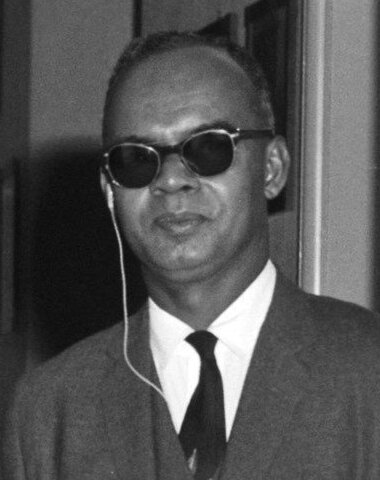
	First party	Second party
Leader	A. N. R. Robinson	Eric Williams
Party	DAC	PNM
Leader since	1971	1955
Leader's seat	Roxborough/Delaford	None (Note: Williams represented Port-of-Spain South in the national House of Representatives)
Seats won	8 / 12	4 / 12
Popular vote	8,447	7,097
Percentage	53.14%	44.65%
Elected Chairman
A. N. R. Robinson
DAC

House of Assembly elections were held on 24 November 1980 to elect the twelve members of the Tobago House of Assembly. The Democratic Action Congress won eight seats with 53.14% of the vote, while the People's National Movement won four seats with 44.65% of the vote.

== Results ==
Party	Votes	%	Seats
Democratic Action Congress	8,447	53.14	8
People's National Movement	7,097	44.65	4
Fargo House Movement	351	2.21	0
Total	15,895	100.00	12
Valid votes	15,895	99.41	
Invalid/blank votes	95	0.59	
Total votes	15,990	100.00	
Registered voters/turnout	24,141	66.24	
Source: EBC
