= Eudine =

Eudine is a given name. Notable people with the name include:

== People with the name ==
- Eudine Barriteau (born 1954), Grenadian gender and public policy professor
- Eudine Job-Davis, Trinidad and Tobago politician

== See also ==
- Udine
