= Benjamin Pitt =

Tobago politician

Member of the House of Representatives for Tobago West
- In office 4 December 1961 – 13 September 1976
- Preceded by: constituency established
- Succeeded by: Winston Murray

Attorney General of Trinidad and Tobago
- In office 1973–1976
- Preceded by: Karl Hudson-Phillips
- Succeeded by: Selwyn Richardson

Personal details
- Party: People's National Movement

Benjamin Llewellyn Basil Pitt was a Tobago politician. He served as a member of parliament and as Attorney General of Trinidad and Tobago.

== See also ==
- List of Trinidad and Tobago Members of Parliament
- List of MPs for constituencies in Tobago
