= Nathaniel Moore (politician) =

Trinidad and Tobago politician

Member of the House of Representatives for Tobago East
- In office 11 December 2000 – 10 December 2001
- Preceded by: A. N. R. Robinson
- Succeeded by: Eudine Job-Davis

Government senator
- In office 1995–2000

Personal details
- Party: National Alliance for Reconstruction

Nathaniel Moore is a Tobago politician. He served in both houses of the Parliament of Trinidad and Tobago.

== Career ==
He was elected MP at the 2000 Trinidad and Tobago general election for the National Alliance for Reconstruction. In 2019, he criticised the leaders of One Tobago Voice.

== See also ==
- List of Trinidad and Tobago Members of Parliament
