= Delmon Baker =

Trinidad and Tobago politician

Member of the House of Representatives for Tobago West
- In office 24 May 2010 – 7 September 2015
- Preceded by: Stanford Callender
- Succeeded by: Shamfa Cudjoe

Personal details
- Party: Tobago Forwards (since 2016)
- Other political affiliations: Tobago Organisation of the People (until 2016)

Delmon Baker is a Tobago politician. He was elected MP at the 2010 Trinidad and Tobago general election for the Tobago Organisation of the People. He served as a Minister in the Ministry of Tourism under Kamla Persad-Bissessar. In 2016, he joined Tobago Forwards.

In 2025, Baker was appointed CEO of the Tobago Regional Health Authority (TRHA).

== See also ==
- List of Trinidad and Tobago Members of Parliament
