= Joel Sampson =

Trinidad and Tobago politician

The Honourable Joel Sampson MP

Member of Parliament for Tobago West
- Incumbent
- Assumed office 3 May 2025
- Preceded by: Shamfa Cudjoe

Personal details
- Party: Tobago People's Party

Joel Marcus Sampson is a Tobago politician from the Tobago People's Party (TPP). He has been MP for Tobago West in the House of Representatives since 2025.

== Career ==
Sampson was Secretary of Community Development, Youth Development and Sport in the Tobago House of Assembly.

In the 2025 Trinidad and Tobago general election, Sampson unseated Shamfa Cudjoe.

== Electoral history ==
2025 Trinidad and Tobago general election: Tobago West
Party	Candidate	Votes	%	±%
TPP	Joel Sampson	6,713	46.7%	new party
PNM	Shamfa Cudjoe	6,604	45.9%	▼20.84
PDP	Curtis Douglas	608	4.2%	▼28.45
PF	Aretha Paula Clarke	154	1.1%	Steady
All People's Party (Trinidad and Tobago)	Dexter James	87	0.6%	Steady
IDA	Kay Trotman	82	0.7%	Steady
CARM	Ricardo Phillip	61	0.4%	Steady
UTP	Nickosy Phillips	37	0.3%	Steady
Independent	Leroy George	38	0.3%	Steady
Majority		109	0.8%	
Turnout		14,379	49.82%	
Registered electors		28,863		
TPP gain from PNM		Swing	%	

== See also ==
- 13th Republican Parliament of Trinidad and Tobago
