= Manning Administration (1991–1995) =

The Manning Administration (1991–1995) was the Cabinet formed by the People's National Movement (PNM) under Prime Minister Patrick Manning following the general election of December 1991. It was the first PNM government since the party lost power to the National Alliance for Reconstruction in 1986. The administration governed Trinidad and Tobago from 13 January 1992 until 6 October 1995, when it was succeeded by the United National Congress administration after the general election of November 1995.

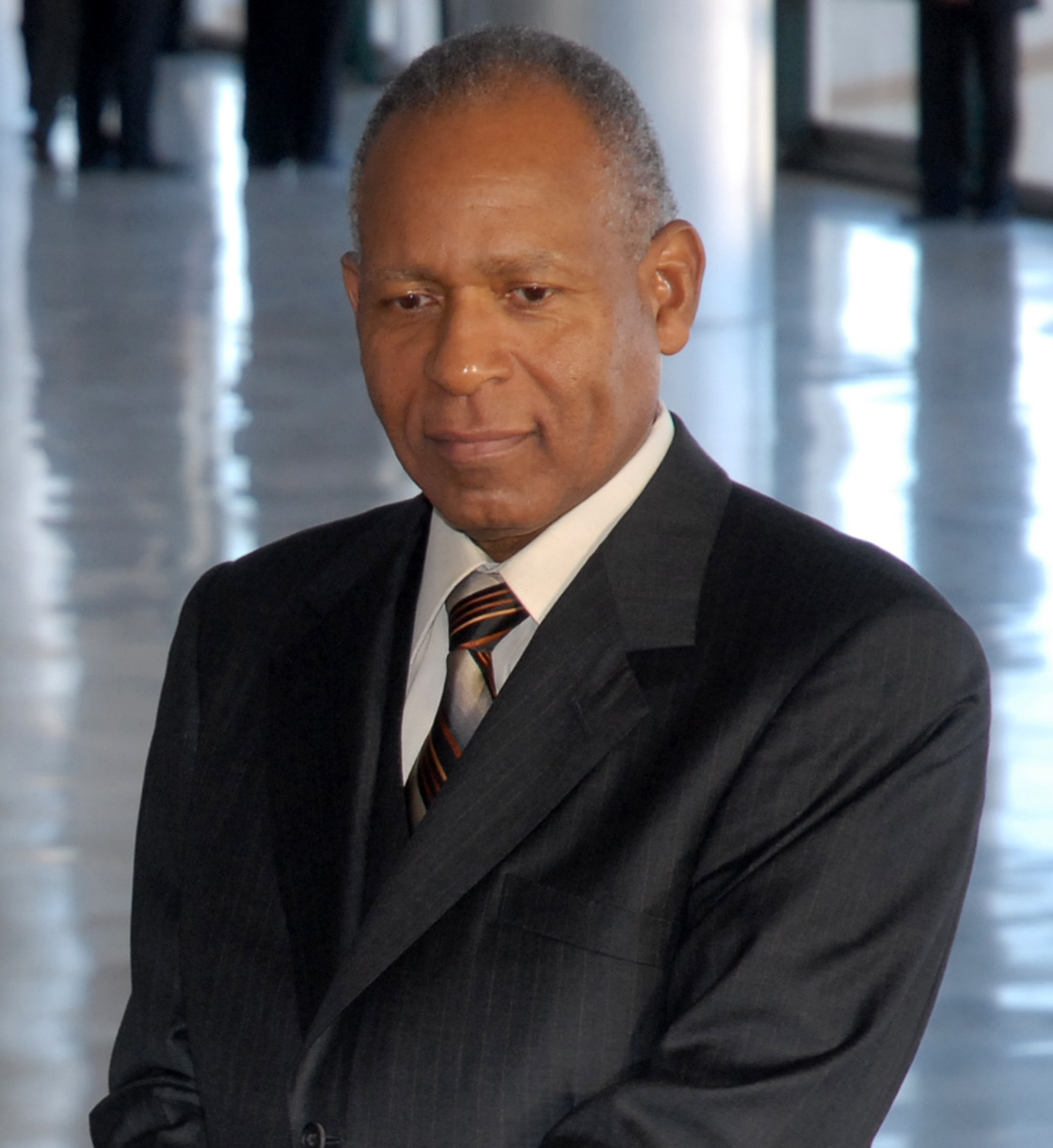
Patrick Manning (PNM),
Prime Minister of Trinidad and Tobago

== The Cabinet ==
| OFFICE | NAME | TERM |
| Prime Minister | Patrick Manning | 13 January 1992 – 6 October 1995 |
| Attorney General; Minister of Legal Affairs | Keith Sobion | 13 January 1992 – 6 October 1995 |
| Minister of Consumer Affairs and Social Services | Linda Baboolal | 13 January 1992 – 24 January 1994 |
| Minister of Social Development | Linda Baboolal | 25 January 1994 – 21 May 1995 |
| | Russell Huggins | 22 May 1995 – 6 October 1995 |
| Minister of Health | John Eckstein | 13 January 1992 – 21 May 1995 |
| | Linda Baboolal | 22 May 1995 – 6 October 1995 |
| Minister of Energy and Energy Industries | Barry Barnes | 13 January 1992 – 6 October 1995 |
| Minister of Labour and Cooperatives | Kenneth Collis | 13 January 1992 – 6 October 1995 |
| Minister of Foreign Affairs | Ralph Maraj | 13 January 1992 – 21 May 1995 |
| | Knowlson Gift | 8 May 1995 – 18 May 1995 |
| | Gordon Draper | 22 May 1995 – 6 October 1995 |
| Minister of National Security | Russell Huggins | 13 January 1992 – 21 May 1995 |
| | John Eckstein | 22 May 1995 – 6 October 1995 |
| Minister of Works and Transport | Colm Imbert | 13 January 1992 – 8 November 1995 |
| Minister of Trade, Industry and Tourism | Brian Kuei Tung | 13 January 1992 – 6 October 1995 |
| Minister of Housing and Settlements | Vincent Lasse | 13 January 1992 – 6 October 1995 |
| Minister of Public Utilities | Morris Marshall | 13 January 1992 – 13 March 1994 |
| | Ralph Maraj | 22 May 1995 – 4 August 1995 |
| Minister of Finance | Wendell Mottley | 13 January 1992 – 6 October 1995 |
| Minister of Tourism | Wendell Mottley | 25 January 1994 – 6 October 1995 |
| Minister of Sport and Youth Affairs | Jean Pierre | 13 January 1992 – 6 October 1995 |
| Minister of Education | Augustus Ramrekersingh | 13 January 1992 – 6 October 1995 |
| Minister of Agriculture, Land and Marine Resources | Keith Rowley | 13 January 1992 – 6 October 1995 |
| Minister of Planning and Development | Lenny Saith | 18 December 1991 – 20 April 1992 |
| Minister of Local Government | Kenneth Valley | 13 January 1992 – 24 January 1994 |
| | Colm Imbert | 25 January 1994 – 8 November 1995 |
| Minister of Trade and Industry | Kenneth Valley | 25 January 1994 – 6 October 1995 |
| Minister of Community Development, Culture and Women's Affairs | Joan Yuille-Williams | 13 January 1992 – 6 October 1995 |
| Minister of Consumer Affairs | Camille Robinson-Regis | 25 January 1994 – 6 October 1995 |
| Minister of Information | Camille Robinson-Regis | 9 January 1992 – 24 January 1994 |

Government offices
| Preceded by NAR Administration | Government of the Republic of Trinidad and Tobago; 1991–1995 | Succeeded by UNC Administration |
