= Stanford Callender =

Trinidad and Tobago politician

Member of the House of Representatives for Tobago West
- In office 11 December 2000 – 24 May 2010
- Preceded by: Pamela Nicholson
- Succeeded by: Delmon Baker

Government Senator
- In office 1992–1995

Personal details
- Party: People's National Movement

Stanford Callender is a Trinidad and Tobago politician. He served as a member of both houses of the Parliament of Trinidad and Tobago.

== Early life ==
Callender hails from the seaside village of Black Rock in Tobago.

== Career ==
Under Patrick Manning he served as Minister of State in the Office of the Prime Minister (Tobago Affairs).

In 2021, he resigned as chairman of the People’s National Movement (PNM) Tobago Council. This was following the December 2021 Tobago House of Assembly election.

In 2024, he received the Hummingbird Gold Medal at the Republic Day National Awards at President’s House.

== See also ==
- List of Trinidad and Tobago Members of Parliament
- List of MPs for constituencies in Tobago
