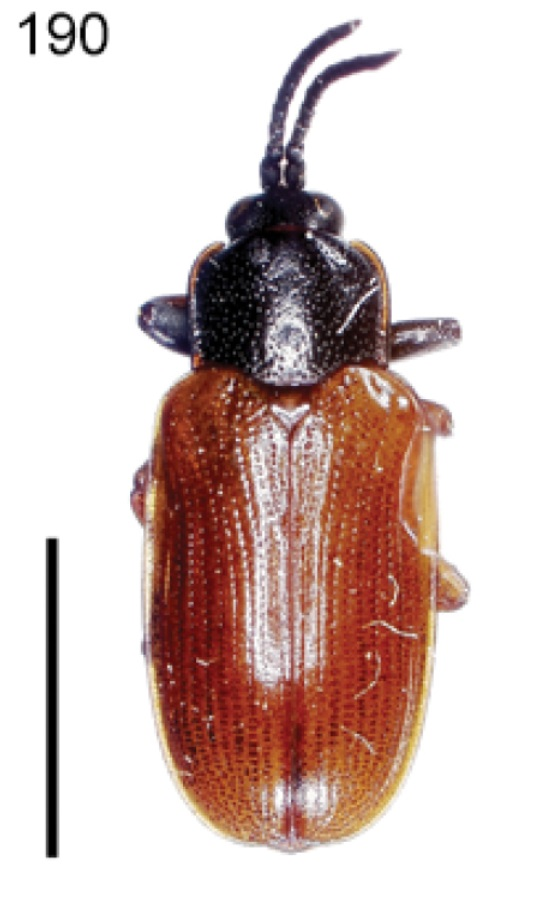

Scientific classification
- Kingdom: Animalia
- Phylum: Arthropoda
- Clade: Pancrustacea
- Class: Insecta
- Order: Coleoptera
- Suborder: Polyphaga
- Infraorder: Cucujiformia
- Family: Chrysomelidae
- Genus: Cephaloleia
- Species: C. neglecta

Binomial name
- Cephaloleia neglecta Weise, 1910

= Cephaloleia neglecta =

Species of beetle

Cephaloleia neglecta is a species of beetle of the family Chrysomelidae. It is found in Bolivia, Brazil (Rondonia), Colombia, Ecuador, Panama, Peru and Venezuela.

== Description ==
Adults reach a length of about 5.7–6.5 mm. Adults are yellowish, while the antennae, head and pronotum (except for a reddish lateral margin) are darker.

== Biology ==
The recorded food plants are Heliconia aurea and Heliconia bihai and adults have been collected on Heliconia stricta.
