= Pamela Nicholson (politician) =

Trinidadian politician

Member of the House of Representatives for Tobago West
- In office 15 December 1986 – 11 December 2000
- Preceded by: James Ogiste
- Succeeded by: Stanford Callender

Member of the House of Representatives for Tobago East
- In office 9 November 1981 – 15 December 1986
- Preceded by: A. N. R. Robinson
- Succeeded by: A. N. R. Robinson

Personal details
- Party: National Alliance for Reconstruction (1986 to 1997)
- Other political affiliations: Democratic Action Congress (until 1986)

Pamela Nicholson is a Trinidadian politician. She served as a member of parliament and as a government minister.

== Career ==
Pamela Nicholson first entered politics as an advocate for autonomy for the island of Tobago. She was elected in the 1981 Trinidad and Tobago general election, becoming the first Tobago woman elected to the Parliament of Trinidad and Tobago. Nicholson served in the National Alliance for Reconstruction government. She was the first Tobago woman to be appointed a government minister. She served as Minister of Settlements and Public Utilities under Prime Minister A. N. R. Robinson. As minister she cut the ribbon for new construction projects. In the 1990s she served as sports minister. She left the party in 1997. This was because she did not support her party's choice of by-election candidate.

Nicholson supported the Tobago People's Party and Kamla Persad-Bissessar of the United National Congress (UNC) in the 2010 Trinidad and Tobago general election. Nicholson endorsed the Progressive Democratic Patriots at the 2020 Trinidad and Tobago general election. She supported the party in the 2022 Tobago Council of the People's National Movement leadership election.

In 2024, she was honoured with the naming of "Pamela Nicholson Boulevard". This was part of the renaming of numerous buildings, streets and fishing depots which were renamed to honour local heroes. The road is part of the Shirvan/Store Bay connector road development.

She remains the only Tobagonian to represent the Tobago East and Tobago West constituencies in the Parliament of Trinidad and Tobago.

== Personal life ==
In 2004, Nicholson was stabbed during a home invasion along with her sister. The sisters were hospitalised with serious injuries but recovered. In 2010, the suspect charged with the crime was killed in a jet ski accident.

== See also ==
- List of Trinidad and Tobago Members of Parliament
- List of MPs for constituencies in Tobago
