= Winston Murray (Trinidad and Tobago politician) =

Tobago politician

Member of the House of Representatives for Tobago West
- In office 13 September 1976 – 9 November 1981
- Preceded by: Benjamin Pitt
- Succeeded by: James Ogiste

Personal details
- Born: c.1934 Charlotteville, Tobago
- Died: 1 January 2017 (aged 83) Hampton, Virginia
- Party: Democratic Action Congress
- Spouse(s): Alice Murray Jamison; Cynthia Camper Harvey
- Children: Melita and Aisha

Winston Murray (c.1934 - 1 January 2017) was a Tobago politician and educator.

Murray was born and raised in Charlotteville, Tobago, the son of Gouril and Melita Lewis Murray. He attended the Charlotteville Methodist School and Speyside Anglican Schools, following which he was an apprentice tailor, before attended Osmond High School and St. Mary's College in Port of Spain. He enrolled at Howard University in majoring in Spanish and Latin American history, graduating in 1963, subsequently attending Georgetown University and obtaining a Masters degree. He gained his doctorate in Latin American Studies at the American University. He taught at Morgan State University and Bowie State University, also lecturing at the National Intelligence University.

When he returned to Trinidad, Murray worked in the Foreign Service and published The Politics of the Dispossessed: Politics, Labour and Social Legislation in the Commonwealth Caribbean. After leaving the Foreign Service, Murray joined the newly formed Democratic Action Congress and championed for Tobago's independence.

He was elected MP at the 1976 Trinidad and Tobago general election. He served until 1981, and was influential in forming the Tobago House of Assembly in 1980.

== See also ==
- List of Trinidad and Tobago Members of Parliament
