= Vernella Alleyne-Toppin =

Trinidad and Tobago politician

Member of the House of Representatives for Tobago East
- In office 24 May 2010 – 7 September 2015
- Preceded by: Rennie Dumas
- Succeeded by: Ayanna Webster-Roy

Personal details
- Party: Tobago Organisation of the People

Vernella Alleyne-Toppin is a Tobago politician. She was elected MP at the 2010 Trinidad and Tobago general election for the Tobago Organisation of the People. She served as a minister in People's Partnership administration under Kamla Persad-Bissessar. She supported the Progressive Democratic Party in the 2020 general election.

== See also ==
- List of Trinidad and Tobago Members of Parliament
- List of MPs for constituencies in Tobago
