= Zorisha Hackett =

Trinidadian politician

The Honourable Zorisha Hackett AM

Member of Parliament for Bethesda/Les Coteaux

Personal details
- Party: Tobago People's Party

Zorisha Hackett is a Tobagonian politician who is a member of the Tobago House of Assembly.

In the government she is the Secretary of Education, Research and Technology.
