= James Ogiste =

Tobago politician

Member of the House of Representatives for Tobago West
- In office 9 November 1981 – 15 December 1986
- Preceded by: Winston Murray
- Succeeded by: Pamela Nicholson

Personal details
- Party: Democratic Action Congress

James Ivan Ogiste (died January 1, 2023) was a Tobago politician. He was elected MP at the 1981 Trinidad and Tobago general election.

== See also ==
- List of Trinidad and Tobago Members of Parliament
