= Tobago House of Assembly elections =

Elections to the Tobago House of Assembly have taken place every 4–5 years since its establishment in 1980. There are twelve electoral districts, each electing one representative. The People's National Movement has been successful in all five elections between 2001 and 2017. Between 1980 and 1996, parties achieving a majority were the Democratic Action Congress and the National Alliance for Reconstruction.

== 1980 ==
Party	Votes	%	Seats
Democratic Action Congress	8,447	53.14	8
People's National Movement	7,097	44.65	4
Fargo House Movement	351	2.21	0
Total	15,895	100.00	12
Valid votes	15,895	99.41	
Invalid/blank votes	95	0.59	
Total votes	15,990	100.00	
Registered voters/turnout	24,141	66.24	
Source: EBC

== 1984 ==
Party	Votes	%	+/–	Seats	+/–
Democratic Action Congress	11,189	56.90	+3.76	11	+3
People's National Movement	8,200	41.70	–2.95	1	–3
National Joint Action Committee	274	1.39	New	0	New
Total	19,663	100.00	–	12	0
Valid votes	19,663	99.38			
Invalid/blank votes	123	0.62			
Total votes	19,786	100.00			
Registered voters/turnout	28,220	70.11			
Source: EBC

== 1988 ==
Party	Votes	%	+/–	Seats	+/–
National Alliance for Reconstruction	10,610	63.69	New	11	New
People's National Movement	5,977	35.88	–5.82	1	0
Independents	73	0.44	New	0	New
Total	16,660	100.00	–	12	0
Valid votes	16,660	99.64			
Invalid/blank votes	60	0.36			
Total votes	16,720	100.00			
Registered voters/turnout	31,224	53.55			
Source: EBC

== 1992 ==
Party	Votes	%	+/–	Seats	+/–
National Alliance for Reconstruction	10,401	58.70	–4.99	11	0
People's National Movement	6,562	37.03	+1.15	1	0
Independents	757	4.27	+3.83	0	0
Total	17,720	100.00	–	12	0
Valid votes	17,720	99.22			
Invalid/blank votes	140	0.78			
Total votes	17,860	100.00			
Registered voters/turnout	31,503	56.69			
Source: EBC

== 1996 ==
Party	Votes	%	+/–	Seats	+/–
National Alliance for Reconstruction	8,973	60.10	+1.86	10	–1
People's National Movement	5,023	33.64	–3.10	1	0
Independents	935	6.26	+2.02	1	+1
Total	14,931	100.00	–	12	0
Valid votes	14,931	99.31			
Invalid/blank votes	103	0.69			
Total votes	15,034	100.00			
Registered voters/turnout	34,245	43.90			
Source: EBC

== 2001 ==
Party	Votes	%	+/–	Seats	+/–
Tobago Council of the People's National Movement	10,500	46.73	+13.09	8	+7
National Alliance for Reconstruction	8,637	38.44	–21.66	4	–6
United National Congress	1,757	7.82	New	0	New
People's Empowerment Party	1,575	7.01	New	0	New
Total	22,469	100.00	–	12	0
Valid votes	22,469	99.34			
Invalid/blank votes	150	0.66			
Total votes	22,619	100.00			
Registered voters/turnout	37,616	60.13			
Source: EBC

== 2005 ==
Party	Votes	%	+/–	Seats	+/–
Tobago Council of the People's National Movement	12,137	58.02	+11.29	11	+3
Democratic Action Congress	8,453	40.41	New	1	New
National Alliance for Reconstruction	123	0.59	–37.85	0	–4
Independents	207	0.99	New	0	New
Total	20,920	100.00	–	12	0
Valid votes	20,920	99.56			
Invalid/blank votes	93	0.44			
Total votes	21,013	100.00			
Registered voters/turnout	38,608	54.43			
Source: EBC

Buccoo/Mt Pleasant Terrence Holmes (DAC): 456, Albert Pilgrim (PNM): 1100.

Canaan/Bon Accord George Archer (DAC) 592, Frank Roberts (PNM): 824

Black Rock/Spring Garden George Graham (DAC): 684, Claudia Groome-Duke (PNM): 1,146

Plymouth/Golden Lane Hochoy Charles (DAC): 874, Godwin Adams (PNM): 1,070

Providence/Mason Hall/Moriah Ashworth Jack (DAC): 931, Quashie Rennison (PNM): 885

Belle Garden/Goodwood Wendell Berkley (PNM): 1,018, Tracy Nathalie Tobias (DAC): 718

Parlatuvier / L'anse Fourmi / Speyside Anthony Knolly Christmas (DAC): 726, Spencer Adlington (PNM): 1,031

Roxborough / Delaford Cecil Caruth (DAC): 715, Hilton Sandy (PNM): 1,039

Bacolet / Mount Saint George Cynthia Loretta Alfred (PNM) 845, Orville Clyde Jordan (DAC): 842

Lambeau / Signal Hill Barry Nelson (DAC): 537, Oswald Wilson (PNM): 1130

Scarborough / Calder Hall Orville London (PNM): 1,039, Judy Michelle Bobb (DAC): 548

== 2013 ==
Party	Votes	%	Seats
People's National Movement	19,919	61.2	12
Tobago Organisation of the People	11,927	36.7	0
The Platform of Truth	675	2.1	0
Independents			0
Rejected	130		

== 2017 ==
In the elections of 23 January 2017, the People's National Movement won 10 seats, and the Progressive Democratic Patriots won two.
