= National Trinidad and Tobago Party =

Political party in Trinidad and Tobago

The National Trinidad and Tobago Party was a political party in Trinidad and Tobago. It contested the 1976 general elections, but received just 115 votes and failed to win a seat. It did not contest any further elections.
