= David Thomas (Trinidad and Tobago politician) =

Trinidad and Tobago politician

The Honourable David Thomas MP

Member of Parliament for Tobago East
- Incumbent
- Assumed office 3 May 2025
- Preceded by: Ayanna Webster-Roy

Personal details
- Party: Tobago People's Party

David Joseph Thomas is a Tobago politician from the Tobago People's Party (TPP). He has been MP for Tobago East in the House of Representatives since 2025.

== Career ==
Thomas was head of the Tobago Division of the Fire Service. While campaigning he was reportedly assaulted. In the 2025 Trinidad and Tobago general election, Thomas unseated Ayanna Webster-Roy.

== Electoral history ==
2025 Trinidad and Tobago general election: Tobago East
Party	Candidate	Votes	%	±%
TPP	David Thomas	7,144	57.0%	▲
PNM	Ayanna Webster-Roy	4,396	35.1%	▼
PDP	Watson Duke	788	6.3%	Steady
PF	Wade Caruth	99	0.8%	Steady
IDA	Gerard Balfour	82	0.7%	Steady
Majority		2,748	21.9%	
Turnout		12,542	52.58%	
Registered electors		23,853		
TPP gain from PNM		Swing	%	

== See also ==
- 13th Republican Parliament of Trinidad and Tobago
