= The Mercy Society =

The Mercy Society was a political party in Trinidad and Tobago. It contested the 2000 general elections, but received just 142 votes and failed to win a seat. The party did not contest any further elections.
