= Ayanna Webster-Roy =

Trinidad and Tobago politician

Member of Parliament for Tobago East
- In office 11 September 2015 – 18 March 2025
- Prime Minister: Keith Rowley
- Preceded by: Vernella Alleyne-Toppin
- Succeeded by: David Thomas

Personal details
- Party: People's National Movement

Ayanna Webster-Roy is a Trinidad and Tobago People's National Movement politician. She was elected a Member of Parliament in the House of Representatives for Tobago East in the 2015 general election. She was a Minister in the Office of the Prime Minister.

== Early life ==
Webster-Roy was born in Roxborough, Tobago and attended Roxborough Anglican School and Bishop's High School. She graduated from the University of the West Indies in 2002 with a major in Sociology and minors in Human Resource Management and Psychology. Her first job was with the National On-the-Job Training Programme as a Field / Placement Officer for the Tobago region. She moved with her husband to England, where she worked from 2004 to 2008 as a Project Officer for the North Central London Specialised Commissioning Team in the Haringey Teaching Primary Care Trust, St Ann's Hospital, London.

In April 2010, she became a Community Development Coordinator in the Department of Community Development in the Tobago House of Assembly.

== Political career ==
Webster-Roy was first elected to the Trinidad and Tobago House of Representatives on September 7, 2015, after the 2015 general election. She is a member of the People's National Movement for the electoral district of Tobago East. On September 11, 2015, she was appointed Minister of State in the Office of the Prime Minister. She was re-elected to her seat in the 2020 general election on August 10, 2020. On August 19, 2020, she was appointed Minister in the Office of the Prime Minister and she has responsibility for Gender and Child Affairs, Ecclesiastical Affairs and Central Administration Services in Tobago. In this role, she has been working on creating a white paper on the National Child Policy, which would be the first in the region.

In the 2025 Trinidad and Tobago general election, Webster-Roy was unseated by David Thomas from the Tobago People's Party.

== Personal life ==
She is married and has three children: two daughters and a son. As of 2020, she was studying for a master's degree in institutional innovation and effectiveness, focusing on the public sector.

== Electoral history ==
2025 Trinidad and Tobago general election: Tobago East
| Party | Candidate | Votes | % | ±% |
|---|---|---|---|---|
| TPP | David Thomas | 7,144 | 57.0% | ▲ |
| PNM | Ayanna Webster-Roy | 4,396 | 35.1% | ▼ |
| PDP | Watson Duke | 788 | 6.3% | Steady |
| PF | Wade Caruth | 99 | 0.8% | Steady |
| IDA | Gerard Balfour | 82 | 0.7% | Steady |
| Majority | | 2,748 | 21.9% | |
| Turnout | | 12,542 | 52.58% | |
| Registered electors | | 23,853 | | |
| TPP gain from PNM | | Swing | % | |
