= United Freedom Party =

Political party in Trinidad and Tobago

The United Freedom Party was a political party in Trinidad and Tobago. It contested the 1976 general elections, but received just 1,047 votes and failed to win a seat. It did not contest any further elections.
