= One Tobago Voice =

Tobagonian political party

One Tobago Voice is a political party in Tobago, an island located in the Republic of Trinidad and Tobago. The party was founded in 2016 by veteran politician Ashworth Jack, who serves as the party's leader and president.

One Tobago Voice advocates for the devolution of power from the national government to the Tobago House of Assembly (THA), the island's semi-autonomous governing body. The party believes that this would allow Tobago to have greater control over its own affairs and make decisions that are in the best interests of Tobago's residents.

In the 2021 Tobago House of Assembly elections, One Tobago Voice won three seats, making it the second-largest party in the THA. The party has formed a coalition government with the Progressive Democratic Patriots, the largest party in the THA, with Ashworth Jack serving as the Deputy Chief Secretary.

One Tobago Voice has also been active in advocating for various social and economic issues in Tobago, including job creation, healthcare, and education. The party has also called for increased investment in Tobago's tourism industry, which is a major contributor to the island's economy. The party's platform primarily focuses on advocating for the devolution of power from the national government to the Tobago House of Assembly (THA), the island's semi-autonomous governing body, One Tobago Voice believes that devolution would allow Tobago to have greater control over its own affairs and make decisions that are in the best interests of Tobago's residents.

Pro-independence feelings of one Tobago voice were formally represented by the Fargo House Movement.
