= People's Empowerment Party (Trinidad and Tobago) =

Political party in Trinidad and Tobago

The People's Empowerment Party is a political party in Trinidad and Tobago. It contested the 2000 general elections but received just 0.3% of the vote and failed to win a seat. The party did not contest any further national elections, but did run in elections in Tobago. In the 2001 Tobago House of Assembly elections it received 7.1% of the vote, but again failed to win a seat.

The party has not been dissolved, but has not had any significant activity in elections since 2001.
