= Cannabis in Trinidad and Tobago =

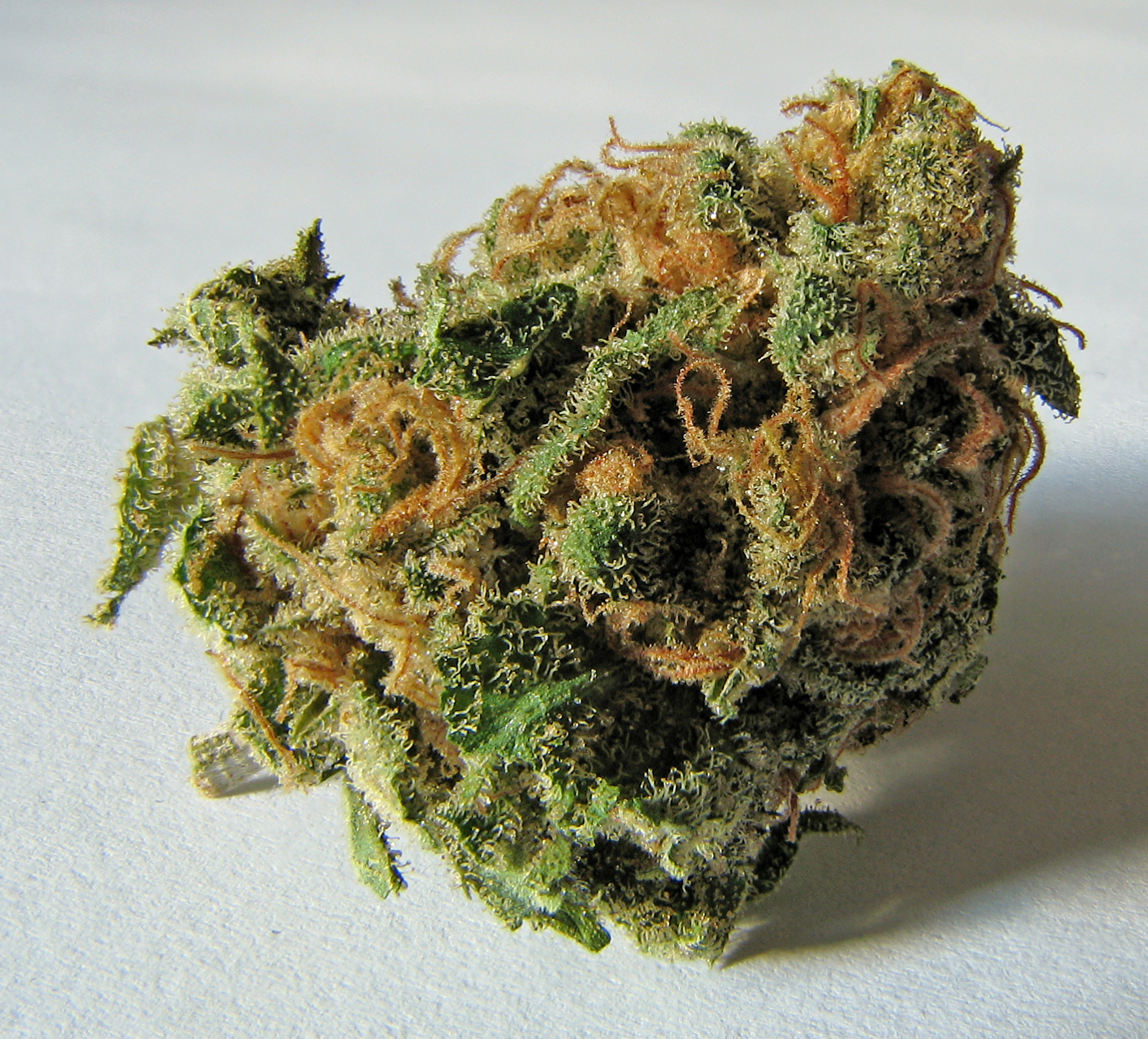
A dried flowered bud of the Cannabis sativa plant

The manufacture, possession, and consumption of cannabis in Trinidad and Tobago is decriminalized.

In September 2018, Prime Minister Keith Rowley announced that he was in discussions with Attorney General Faris Al-Rawi on reviewing the country's cannabis legislation with the possibility of his People's National Movement government potentially decriminalizing the manufacturing, possession, and consumption of cannabis. In December 2019, the government passed a bill in Parliament to decriminalize the cultivation and possession of small quantities of cannabis. The bill was proclaimed as law on 23 December 2019 by President Paula-Mae Weekes.

== History ==
In 1915 Trinidad created the Ganja Ordinance, by which all cannabis sold on the island was gathered into bonded warehouses and distributed only to sellers who paid a license fee, similar to the system found in Bengal. Cannabis was banned in the islands in 1925.

Legal status of cannabis for non-medical use Legal Illegal, but decriminalized Illegal, but often unenforced Illegal Legality unknown

== Decriminalization ==
In 2018, the head of the Caribbean Collective for Justice has called for the nation to decriminalize cannabis. In December 2018, Prime Minister Keith Rowley stated that cannabis would become decriminalized some time in June 2019.

In November 2019, Attorney General Faris Al-Rawi laid two bills in Parliament which decriminalize possession of less than 30 grams (1.1 oz) of marijuana, implement tiered penalties for possession of 30–60 grams (1.1–2.1 oz), and allow cultivation of up to four plants per adult. The decriminalization bill was passed by both houses of Parliament and will be proclaimed into law on 23 December 2019, while the Cannabis Control Authority Bill was sent to a joint select committee.

== See also ==
- Cannabis
- Legality of cannabis
