= Liberation Action Party =

Former political party in Trinidad and Tobago

The Liberation Action Party was a political party in Trinidad and Tobago. It contested the 1976 general elections, but received just 872 votes and failed to win a seat. It did not contest any further elections.
