= Tobago Forwards =

Political party in Tobago

Tobago Forwards is a political party in Tobago, an island located in the Republic of Trinidad and Tobago. The party was founded by political activist Christlyn Moore and Pastor Terance Baynes who serves as the party's leader and president.

Tobago Forwards advocates for the devolution of power from the national government to the Tobago House of Assembly (THA), the island's semi-autonomous governing body. The party believes that this would allow Tobago to have greater control over its own affairs and make decisions that are in the best interests of Tobago's residents. In addition, Tobago Forwards has outlined a number of core principles, including self-determination for Tobago, participatory democracy, merit-based advancement, education and skills training, conservation of the natural environment, and good governance.

In the 2021 Tobago House of Assembly elections, Tobago Forwards formed a coalition with the Progressive Democratic Patriots (PDP) party. The coalition won a total of three seats, making it the third-largest party in the THA. Watson Duke was appointed as the Deputy Chief Secretary of the THA.

Tobago Forwards has also been active in advocating for various social and economic issues in Tobago, including job creation, healthcare, and education. The party has also called for increased investment in Tobago's tourism industry, which is a major contributor to the island's economy.
