= Heliconia bihai =

Red palulu

Scientific classification
- Kingdom: Plantae
- Clade: Tracheophytes
- Clade: Angiosperms
- Clade: Monocots
- Clade: Commelinids
- Order: Zingiberales
- Family: Heliconiaceae
- Genus: Heliconia
- Species: H. bihai

Binomial name
- Heliconia bihai (L.) L.

Synonyms
- Bihai bihai Griggs; Heliconia aurea R.Rodr.; Musa bihai L.

Species of flowering plant

Heliconia bihai (red palulu) of the family Heliconiaceae is an erect herb typically growing taller than 1.5 m. It is native to northern South America and the West Indies. It is especially common in northern Brazil and the Guianas but also found in Hispaniola, Jamaica, the Lesser Antilles, Puerto Rico, Trinidad, Venezuela and Colombia. Other names by which the plant is commonly known include balisier and macawflower.

== Uses ==
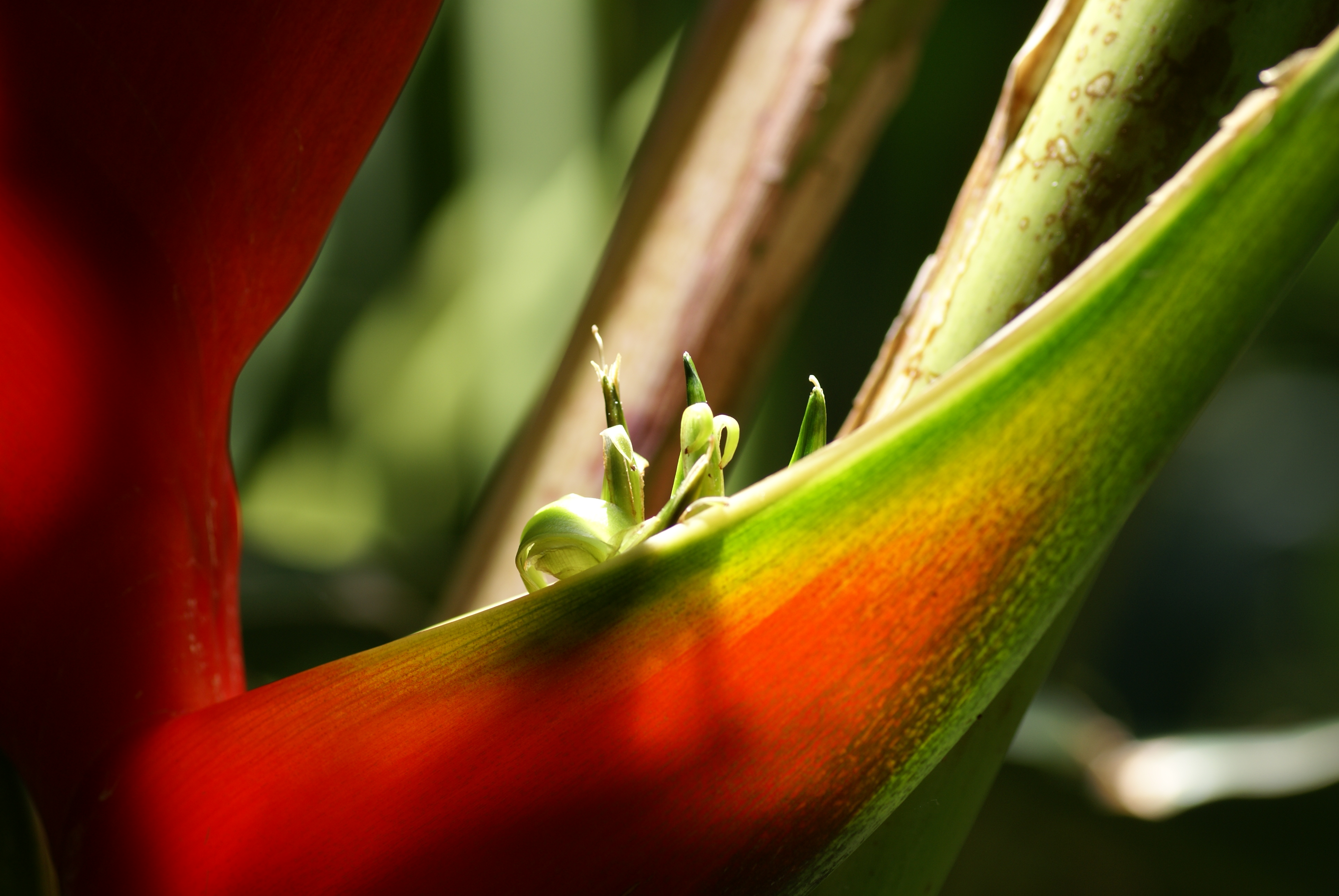
Flowers

This plant is used as an ornamental plant in hot regions with a humid climate (USDA zone 9-11), and is typically pollinated by bats and hummingbirds.

This upward facing flower of the genus Heliconia, which acts as a cup, is a natural source of rain water for birds and insects.

=== Use as a symbol ===
This plant is used as the symbol to represent the People's National Movement political party of Trinidad and Tobago, as well as by the Martinique Progressive Party (Parti Progressiste Martiniquais) of the French Overseas Department of Martinique, in the West Indies.
