= 2013 Tobago House of Assembly election =

Local election in Trinidad and Tobago

- 21 January 2013

All 12 seats in the Tobago House of Assembly 7 seats needed for a majority
- Turnout: 70.08% (▲13.69 pp)
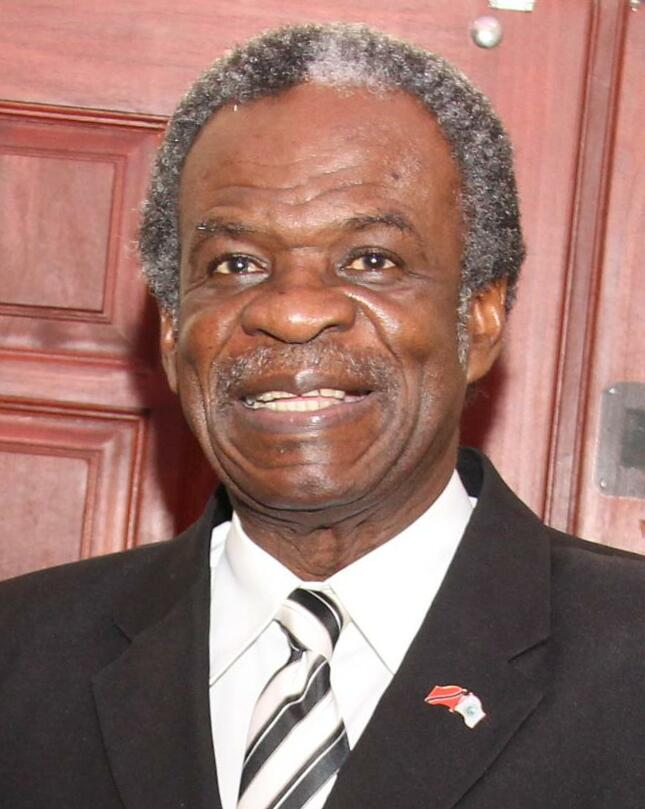
	First party
Leader	Orville London
Party	PNM
Leader since	1998
Leader's seat	Scarborough/Calder Hall
Last election	8 seats, 51.48%
Seats won	12
Seat change	▲4
Popular vote	19,976
Percentage	61.42%
Swing	▲9.94 pp
- Tobago Council of the People's National Movement
Chief Secretary before election
Orville London
PNM
Elected Chief Secretary
Orville London
PNM

A local election for 12 seats in the Tobago House of Assembly was held on 21 January 2013. The election was a clean sweep by the Tobago Council of the People's National Movement, winning all 12 seats in the Tobago House of Assembly, the only time this feat has ever been accomplished in elections in Trinidad and Tobago.

== Political parties contesting ==
- People's National Movement – PNM
- Tobago Organisation of the People – TOP
- The Platform of Truth – TPT

== Results ==
Votes cast to the party listed by Constituencies:

Constituency	Tobago Organisation of the People	People's National Movement	The Platform of Truth	Invalid ballots	Total	Electorate	Turnout
Parlatuvier/L' Anse Fourmi/Speyside	1,175	1,478	24	11	2,688	3,512	76.54%
Goodwood/Belle Garden West	1,251	1,587	50	24	2,912	3,959	73.55%
Belle Garden East/Roxborough/Delaford	1,198	1,420	19	7	2,644	3,624	72.96%
Scarborough/Calder Hall	778	1,830	50	6	2,664	3,938	67.65%
Lambeau/Signal Hill	783	1,953	47	15	2,798	4,117	67.96%
Bacolet/Mt. St. George	905	1,518	42	5	2,470	3,505	70.47%
Canaan/Bon Accord	905	1,564	50	14	2,533	3,774	67.12%
Buccoo/Mt. Pleasant	856	1,802	33	7	2,698	4,041	66.77%
Bethel/Mt Irvine:	1,116	1,617	58	9	2,800	4,058	69.00%
Providence/Mason Hall/Moriah	1,129	1,706	61	12	2,908	4,084	71.20%
Plymouth/Golden Lane	849	1,600	174	16	2,639	3,701	71.31%
Black Rock/Whim/Spring Garden	925	1,901	67	10	2,903	4,288	67.70%
Total	11,870	19,976	675	136	32,657	46,601	70.08%
Total	36.50%	61.42%	2.08%	–			
Swing	▼11.82%	▲9.94%	New	–			
