= Shamfa Cudjoe =

Trinidad and Tobago politician

Shamfa Ashaki Cudjoe (born 1982) is a Trinidad and Tobago politician representing the People's National Movement (PNM). She served as the Member of Parliament in the House of Representatives for Tobago West from the 2015 general election until 2025. She was the Minister of Sport and Community Development until April 2025.

== Early life ==
Cudjoe was born in 1982 as the fourth of eight children. Her mother, Wilma Warner-Cudjoe, is from Mason Hall and her father, Jeffrey Cudjoe, is from Bethel. She attended the Mason Hall and Montgomery Government Primary Schools, the Scarborough Methodist Primary School, the Scarborough Junior Secondary School and Signal Hill Senior Comprehensive School.

She participated in youth activism and served as a youth ambassador for CARICOM and the United Nations. She was president of the Tobago Youth Council and participated in the Regional Youth Parliament initiative. When she was seventeen, she attended the first World Youth Congress in Hawaii in 1999 as a member of the Caribbean delegation.

In 2006, she received her bachelor's degree in international affairs from Bethune-Cookman College in Florida, United States. She then received a masters of science with distinction in international trade policy from the University of the West Indies at Cave Hill. Cudjoe also completed courses in economic development, export diversification, and international food and agriculture trade with the World Bank Institute.

== Career ==
She worked as a trade analyst for the Division of Planning and Development and as an international trade consultant with the Organisation of American States and the Inter-American Development Bank in Washington D.C. She is the assistant director of the Youth Energised for Success programme, an initiative of the Division of Finance and Enterprise in the Tobago House of Assembly.

On 18 June 2010, Cudjoe was appointed as an Opposition Senator in the Senate of Trinidad and Tobago. She was the youngest Tobagonian to be appointed to the Senate. She was first elected to the House of Representatives for Tobago West on 7 September 2015 following the 2015 general election. She was appointed to be the Minister of Tourism on 11 September 2015, a position that she held until 9 April 2018 when she became the Minister of Sport and Youth Affairs.

She was re-elected to represent Tobago West on 10 August 2020, following the 2020 general election. She received 9,275 votes, while her nearest opponent received only 4,501 votes. She was appointed as the Minister of Sport and Community Development on 19 August 2020.

In the 2025 Trinidad and Tobago general election, Cudjoe was unseated by Joel Sampson from the Tobago People's Party.

== Personal life ==
Cudjoe is a member of the Delta Sigma Theta sorority and the founder of the Pink Diamond Society for Ladies Incorporated.

== Electoral history ==
2025 Trinidad and Tobago general election: Tobago West
Party	Candidate	Votes	%	±%
TPP	Joel Sampson	6,713	46.7%	new party
PNM	Shamfa Cudjoe	6,604	45.9%	▼20.84
PDP	Curtis Douglas	608	4.2%	▼28.45
PF	Aretha Paula Clarke	154	1.1%	Steady
All People's Party (Trinidad and Tobago)	Dexter James	87	0.6%	Steady
IDA	Kay Trotman	82	0.7%	Steady
CARM	Ricardo Phillip	61	0.4%	Steady
UTP	Nickosy Phillips	37	0.3%	Steady
Independent	Leroy George	38	0.3%	Steady
Majority		109	0.8%	
Turnout		14,379	49.82%	
Registered electors		28,863		
TPP gain from PNM		Swing	%	
