= Eudine Job-Davis =

Trinidad and Tobago politician

The Honourable Eudine Job-Davis

Member of the House of Representatives for Tobago East
- In office 26 December 2001 – 7 November 2007
- Preceded by: Nathaniel Moore
- Succeeded by: Rennie Dumas

Member of the Senate
- In office 11 July 2000 – 3 November 2000

Personal details
- Party: People's National Movement

Eudine Job-Davis is a Trinidad and Tobago politician. She served in the Parliament of Trinidad and Tobago representing Tobago East. She served as minister of state in the Culture Ministry during the Manning Administration.

== See also ==
- List of Trinidad and Tobago Members of Parliament
