= 2009 Tobago House of Assembly election =

- 19 January 2009

All 12 seats in the Tobago House of Assembly 7 seats needed for a majority
- Turnout: 56.39% (▲1.96 pp)
	First party	Second party
	PNM	TOP
Leader	Orville London	Ashworth Jack
Party	PNM	TOP
Leader since	1998	2008
Leader's seat	Scarborough/Calder Hall	Providence/Mason Hall/Moriah
Last election	11 seats, 58.02%	New party
Seats won	8	4
Seat change	▼3	New party
Popular vote	12,311	11,557
Percentage	51.48%	48.32%
Swing	▼6.54 pp	New party
Chief Secretary before election
Orville London
PNM
Elected Chief Secretary
Orville London
PNM

An election for the Tobago House of Assembly (THA) was held on January 19, 2009. The PNM won 8 seats and obtained 51.48% of the votes while the TOP won 4 seats and 48.32% of the votes.

== Candidates ==
=== People's National Movement ===
- Orville London – Scarborough / Calder Hall
- Carl Alleyne – Bacolet / Mount Saint George
- Wendell Berkley – Goodwood / Belle Gardens
- Hilton Sandy – Roxborough / Delaford
- Tracey Davidson-Celestine – Parlatuvier / L'anse Fourmi / Speyside
- Nathisha Charles Pantin – Providence / Mason Hall / Moriah
- Claudia Groome Duke – Black Rock / Whim / Spring Garden
- Godwin Adams – Plymouth / Golden Lane
- Whitney Alfred – Bethel / Mount Irvine
- Albert Pilgrim – Buccoo / Mount Pleasant
- Frank Roberts – Canaan / Bon Accord
- Oswald Williams – Lambeau / Signal Hill

=== Tobago Organisation of the People ===
- Anthony Arnold – Scarborough / Calder Hall
- Orville Jordan – Bacolet / Mount Saint George
- Steve Jack – Goodwood / Belle Gardens
- Lenn Toppin – Roxborough / Delaford
- Fitzherbert Taylor – Parlatuvier / L'anse Fourmi / Speyside
- Ashworth Jack – Providence / Mason Hall / Moriah
- Yvetter Parks Caruth – Black Rock / Whim / Spring Garden
- Trevor Armstrong – Plymouth / Golden Lane
- Terrence Baynes – Bethel / Mount Irvine
- Donna Parks Greene – Buccoo / Mount Pleasant
- Rolly Quaccoo – Canaan / Bon Accord
- Harrisford McMillan – Lambeau / Signal Hill

=== Independent ===
- Andre Phillips – Bacolet / Mt St George

== Results ==
Party	Votes	%	+/–	Seats	+/–
Tobago Council of the People's National Movement	12,311	51.48	▼6.54%	8	▼3
Tobago Organisation of the People	11,557	48.32	New	4	New
Independents	48	0.20	▼0.79%	0	0
Total	23,916	100.00	–	12	0
Valid votes	23,916	99.51			
Invalid/blank votes	118	0.49			
Total votes	24,034	100.00			
Registered voters/turnout	42,623	56.39			
Source: EBC
