= Fargo House Movement =

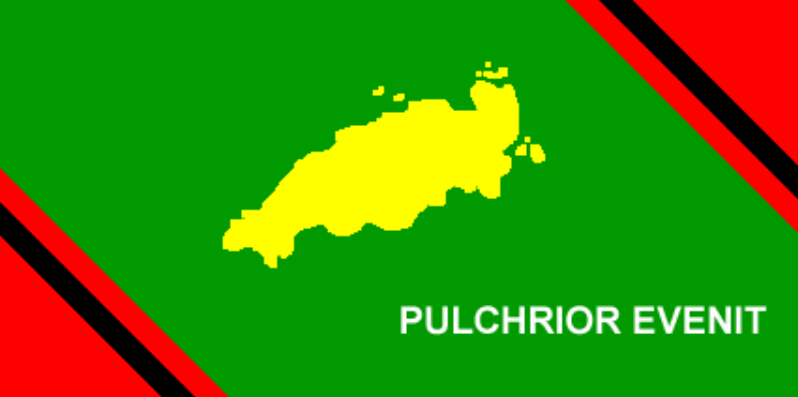
Fargo House Movement flag

The Fargo House Movement was a political party in Trinidad and Tobago that promoted Tobago secession. Named after the late A. P. T. "Fargo" James, it contested the 1981 general elections, but received just 143 votes and failed to win a seat. The party did not contest any further elections.
