= Elections in Trinidad and Tobago =

Trinidad and Tobago elects its House of Representatives (the lower house of its legislature) on the national level. The head of government, the prime minister, is chosen from among the elected representatives on the basis of his or her command of the support of the majority of legislators. The Parliament of the Republic of Trinidad and Tobago has two chambers. The House of Representatives has 41 members, elected for a maximum five-year term in single-seat constituencies. The Senate has 31 members: 16 government senators appointed on the advice of the prime minister, six opposition senators appointed on the advice of the leader of the opposition and nine so-called independent senators appointed by the president to represent other sectors of civil society. The president is elected for a five-year term by an electoral college consisting of the members of both houses of Parliament. Other elected bodies include the local government bodies in Trinidad (two cities, three boroughs, nine regional corporations) and the Tobago House of Assembly, which handles local government in the island of Tobago and is entrenched in the constitution.

Until 1925 Trinidad and Tobago was a British colony ruled through a pure, unelected Crown Colony system, although elected borough and municipal councils existed in Port of Spain and San Fernando. The first elections to the Legislative Council took place in 1925. Seven of the thirteen unofficial members were elected, six unofficials were nominated by the governor, and twelve official members sat in the Legislative Council on an ex-officio basis. The governor had the right to an ordinary vote and an additional casting vote, to break any tie. The franchise was determined by income, property and residence qualifications, and was limited to men over the age of 21 and women over the age of 30. The 1946 elections were the first with universal adult suffrage, during which time there existed an even number of elected and unelected members (excluding the governor).

== Latest elections ==
- 2020 Trinidad and Tobago general election
- 2020 United National Congress internal election
- 2020 Tobago Council of the People's National Movement leadership election
- January 2021 Tobago House of Assembly election
- December 2021 Tobago House of Assembly election
- 2022 United National Congress internal election
- 2022 People's National Movement leadership election
- 2023 Trinidadian local elections
- 2025 Trinidad and Tobago general election

== See also ==
- Electoral calendar
- Electoral system
- List of parliaments of Trinidad and Tobago
- List of Trinidad and Tobago MPs
