= Tobago Organisation of the People =

- Leader: Ashworth Jack
- Founded: 2008
- Split from: Democratic Action Congress
- Ideology: Autonomism; Regionalism
- Political position: Centre-left
- Political coalition: People's Partnership (2010–2015); One Tobago Voice (since 2019)
- House of Representatives: 0 / 41
- Tobago House of Assembly: 0 / 12

The Tobago Organisation of the People (TOP) is an autonomist political party in Tobago formed in 2008. Its current political leader is Ashworth Jack. The party was formed in 2008 from a split with the Democratic Action Congress.

The TOP contested the 2009 Tobago House of Assembly (THA) election, winning four out of twelve seats, all other seats being taken by the People's National Movement (PNM).

The party was a member of the People's Partnership coalition from 2010 to 2015.

The party won two House of Representatives of Trinidad and Tobago seats in the general election on 24 May 2010: Tobago East (Vernella Alleyne-Toppin) and Tobago West (Dr. Delmon Baker).

On 21 January 2013, the party lost by a landslide in an election against the incumbent PNM THA administration, losing the four seats it had previously held. In the 2015 general elections it lost both Tobago seats to the PNM. It did not contest the 2017 Tobago House of Assembly election.

The party joined the One Tobago Voice coalition on 5 May 2019. Other member parties included Tobago Forwards (led by Christlyn Moore) and Platform of Truth (led by Hochoy Charles).
