= 1976 Trinidad and Tobago general election =

General election in Trinidad and Tobago

- 13 September 1976

All 36 seats in the House of Representatives 19 seats needed for a majority
- Turnout: 55.8 (▲22.6 pp)
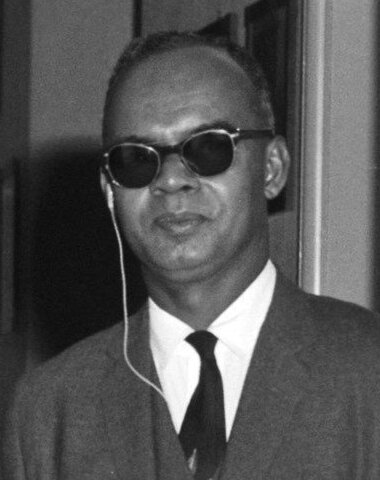

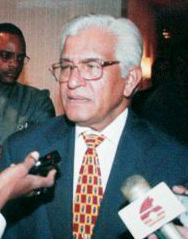

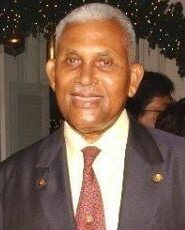
	First party	Second party	Third party
Leader	Eric Williams	Basdeo Panday	A. N. R. Robinson
Party	PNM	ULF	DAC
Leader since	15 January 1961	1975	1971
Leader's seat	Port of Spain South	Couva North	Tobago East
Last election	36 seats, 57.0%	–	–
Seats won	24 / 36	10 / 36	2 / 36
Seat change	▼12	New	New
Popular vote	169,194	84,780	25,586
Percentage	54.2%	27.2%	8.2%
Swing	▼29.9 pp	New	New
Prime Minister before election
Eric Williams
People's National Movement
Subsequent Prime Minister
Eric Williams
People's National Movement

General elections were held in Trinidad and Tobago on 13 September 1976. The result was a victory for the People's National Movement, which won 24 of the 36 seats. Voter turnout was 55.8%.

== Results ==
Party	Votes	%	Seats	+/–
People's National Movement	169,194	54.23	24	–12
United Labour Front	84,780	27.17	10	New
Democratic Action Congress	25,586	8.20	2	New
Tapia House Movement	12,021	3.85	0	New
United Democratic Labour Party	9,404	3.01	0	New
Social Democratic Labour Party	5,928	1.90	0	New
West Indian National Party	1,242	0.40	0	New
United Freedom Party	1,047	0.34	0	New
Liberation Action Party	872	0.28	0	New
National Trinidad and Tobago Party	115	0.04	0	New
Young People's National Party	104	0.03	0	New
Independents	1,692	0.54	0	0
Total	311,985	100.00	36	0
Valid votes	311,985	98.79		
Invalid/blank votes	3,824	1.21		
Total votes	315,809	100.00		
Registered voters/turnout	565,646	55.83		
Source: EBCTT, Nohlen
