= 2000 Trinidad and Tobago general election =

- 11 December 2000

All 36 seats in the House of Representatives 19 seats needed for a majority
- Turnout: 63.1% (▼0.2pp)
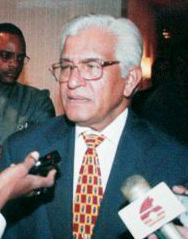

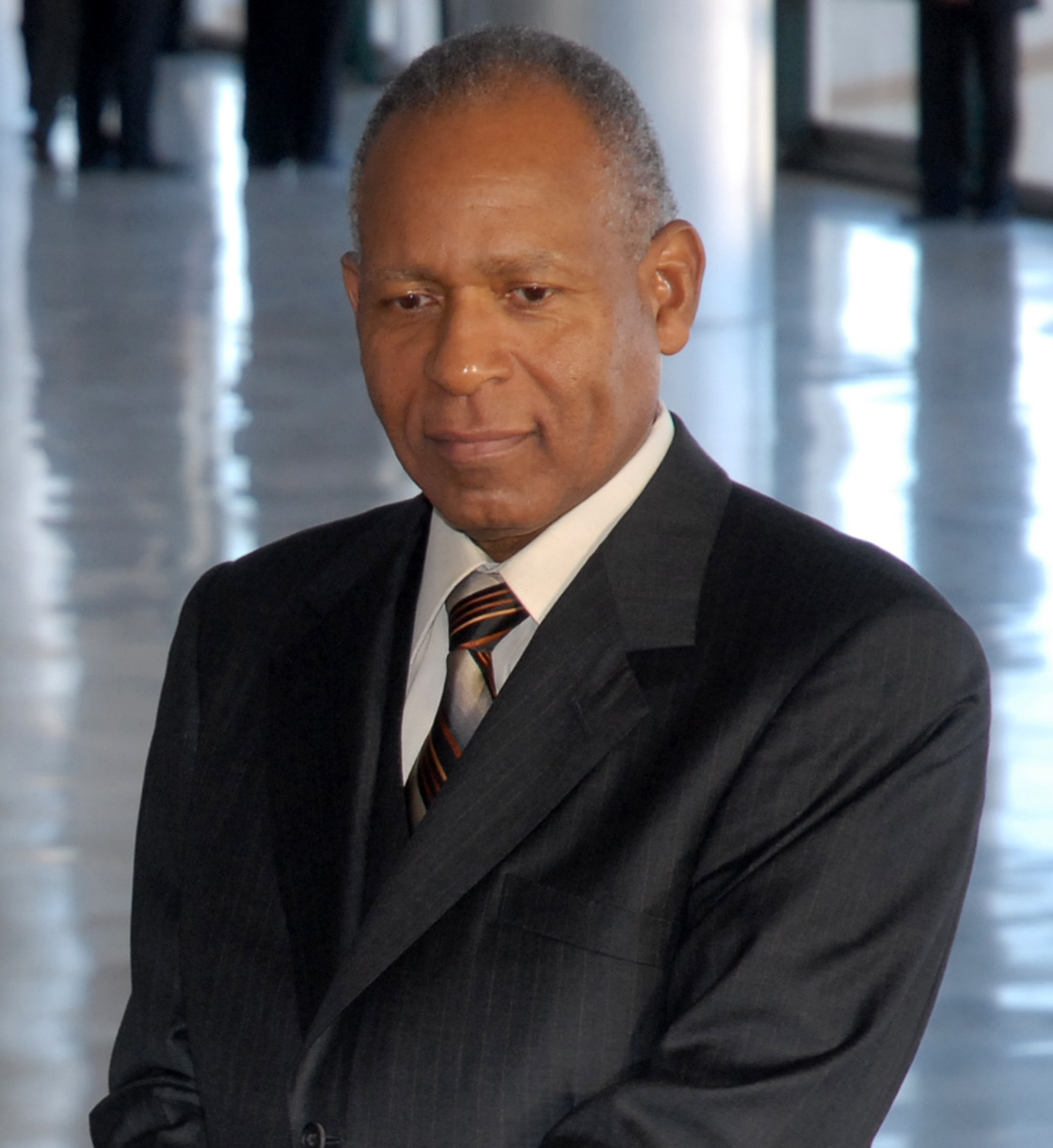

	First party	Second party	Third party
Leader	Basdeo Panday	Patrick Manning	Anthony Smart
Party	UNC	PNM	NAR
Last election	45.8%, 17 seats	48.8%, 17 seats	4.8%, 2 seats
Seats won	19	16	1
Seat change	▲2	▼1	▼1
Popular vote	307,791	276,334	7,409
Percentage	51.7%	46.5%	1.2%
Swing	▲5.9pp	▼2.3pp	▼3.6pp
Prime Minister before election
Basdeo Panday
UNC
Subsequent Prime Minister
Basdeo Panday
UNC

General elections were held in Trinidad and Tobago on 11 December 2000. The result was a victory for the United National Congress, which won 19 of the 36 seats. Voter turnout was 63%.

== Results ==
Party	Votes	%	Seats	+/–
United National Congress	307,791	51.74	19	+2
People's National Movement	276,334	46.45	16	–1
National Alliance for Reconstruction	7,409	1.25	1	–1
People's Empowerment Party	2,071	0.35	0	New
The Mercy Society	142	0.02	0	New
Independents	1,128	0.19	0	New
Total	594,875	100.00	36	0
Valid votes	594,875	99.56		
Invalid/blank votes	2,650	0.44		
Total votes	597,525	100.00		
Registered voters/turnout	947,689	63.05		
Source: EBCTT, Nohlen
