= Tobago House of Assembly =

Governing body in Trinidad and Tobago

- 12th Assembly
- Emblem of the Tobago House of Assembly

- Flag of the Tobago House of Assembly

Type
- Type: Unicameral

Leadership
- Presiding Officer: Niall George, TPP since 14 January 2026
- Chief Secretary: Farley Chavez Augustine, TPP since 9 December 2021
- Minority Leader: None

Structure
- Seats: 15
- Political groups: Government: Tobago People's Party (15); Opposition None

Elections
- Voting system: First-past-the-post
- Last election: 12 January 2026

Meeting place
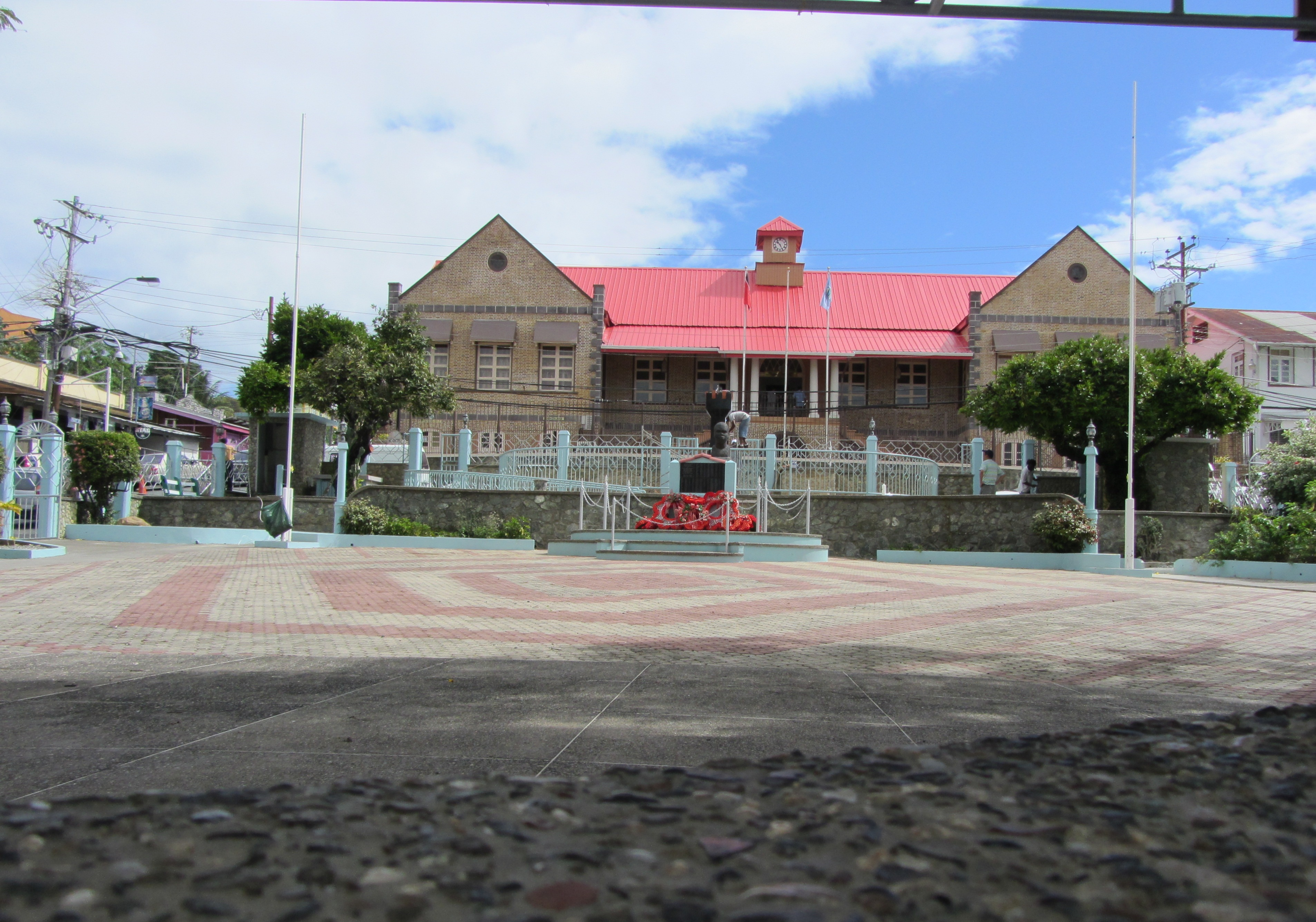
- Assembly Legislative Chambers, Jermingham Street, Scarborough, Tobago, Trinidad and Tobago

Website
- https://www.tha.gov.tt/

The Tobago House of Assembly (THA) is a unicameral devolved legislative body responsible for the island of Tobago within the unitary state of Trinidad and Tobago. The THA was re-established in 1980 to rectify some of the disparities in the relationship between the two islands; a prior body of the same name existed from 1768 to 1874. In addition to the normal local government functions, the THA handles many of the responsibilities of the central government, but has limited ability to collect taxes and to impose local law or zoning regulations. At the helm of the Assembly Legislature is the Presiding Officer with the fifteen elected assemblymen, and four appointed councillors. Three of the councillors are appointed on the advice on the Chief Secretary and one on the advice of the Minority Leader. The Chief Secretary is the leader of the majority party in the assembly and is at the helm of the Executive arm of the THA.

The current Chief Secretary of Tobago is Farley Chavez Augustine who is the second youngest Chief Secretary in history, in office since December 6, 2021. He was elected as a member of the PDP but left the party to first become an independent in 2022, then later setting up his own political party the Tobago People's Party.

== History ==
The first THA elections were held on November 24, 1980. The Democratic Action Congress led by A.N.R. Robinson won eight seats and the People's National Movement (PNM) won four seats (a reversal of the 1977 County Council elections in which the PNM won seven seats and the DAC 4). The DAC went on to win the 1984 elections by a margin of 11–1 over the PNM. The National Alliance for Reconstruction (into which the DAC merged in 1986) continued to dominate the THA winning the 1988 elections, and the 1992 elections by an 11-1 margin over the PNM. It won the 1996 elections by a margin of 10–2, with the PNM and an independent candidate winning one seat each.

In the 2001 elections the PNM gained control of the THA, winning 8 seats to the NAR's four. The PNM consolidated their hold on the THA in the January 2005 elections winning 11 seats while the DAC (which reformed after splintering from the NAR in 2004) gained a single seat.

In the 2009 elections held on January 19, 2009, the PNM won 8 seats while a new party, the Tobago Organization of the People won 4 seats.

In the 2013 elections, the TOP was defeated in a landslide by the PNM, losing the 4 seats it held previously, giving the PNM complete control of the THA. However, Chief Secretary Orville London asked Prime Minister Kamla Persad-Bissessar to introduce a bill in the country's parliament that would change the country's constitution to allow the President of the Republic to choose two independent councillors at his/her discretion to serve as opposition in the THA in the event of a 12-0 election result.

As of 2021, the THA employed about 60% of Tobago's working population.

The Assembly was expanded to 15 members from the December 2021 election.

In December 2022, 13 members of the PDP left the party to govern as independents in 2022, and in 2023 set up the Tobago People's Party.

On January 12, 2026, the TPP won all 15 seats in the Assembly in the 2026 Tobago House of Assembly election.

== Current Assembly Members ==
Incumbent	Party	Electoral District
Natisha Charles Pantin	TPP	Bagatelle/Bacolet
Orlando Kerr	TPP	Roxborough/Argyle
Darren Henry	TPP	Bethel/New Grange
Ricky Joefield	TPP	Darrell Spring/Whim
Keigon Denoon	TPP	Buccoo/Mt Pleasant
Niketa Percy	TPP	Bon Accord/Crown Point
Faith Brebnor	TPP	Belle Garden/Glamorgan
Nigel Taitt	TPP	Signal Hill/Patience Hill
Farley Chavez Augustine	TPP	Parlatuvier/L’Anse Fourmi/Speyside
Zorisha Hackett	TPP	Bethesda/Les Coteaux
Ian Pollard	TPP	Mason Hall/Moriah
Trevor James	TPP	Scarborough/Mt Grace
Megan Morrison	TPP	Mt St George/Goodwood
Wane Clarke	TPP	Lambeau/Lowlands
Kern Alexis	TPP	Plymouth/Black Rock

== Party Divisions by Assembly ==
Session	Election	PNM	PDP		Total seats
12th	Monday, 6 December 2021	1	14		15
11th	Monday, 25 January 2021	6	6		12
10th	Monday, 23 January 2017	10	2		12
Session	Election	PNM			Total seats
9th	Monday, 21 January 2013	12			12
Session	Election	PNM	TOP		Total seats
8th	Monday, 19 January 2009	8	4		12
Session	Election	PNM	DAC		Total seats
7th	Monday, 17 January 2005	11	1		12
Session	Election	PNM	NAR		Total seats
6th	Monday, 29 January 2001	8	4		12
Session	Election	PNM	NAR	Independent	Total seats
5th	Monday, 9 December 1996	1	10	1	12
4th	Monday, 7 December 1992	1	11		12
3rd	Tuesday, 29 November 1988	1	11		12
Session	Election	PNM	DAC		Total seats
2nd	Monday, 26 November 1984	1	11		12
1st	Monday, 24 November 1980	4	8		12

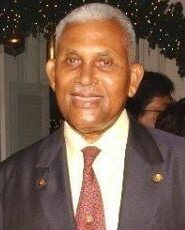
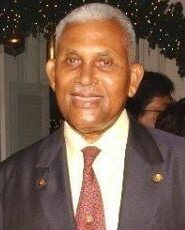
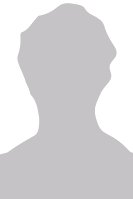
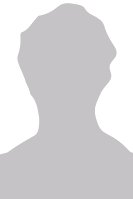
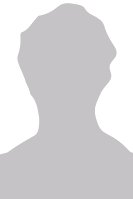
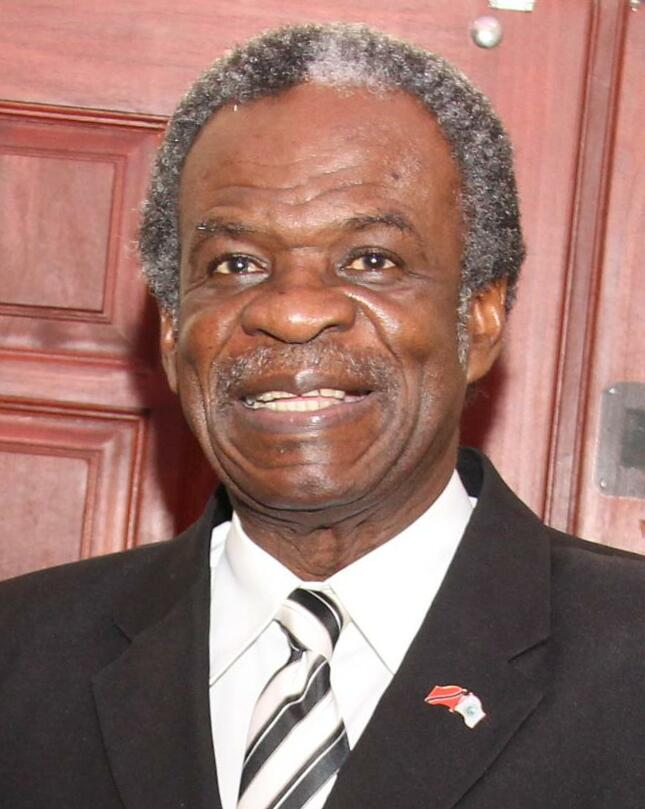
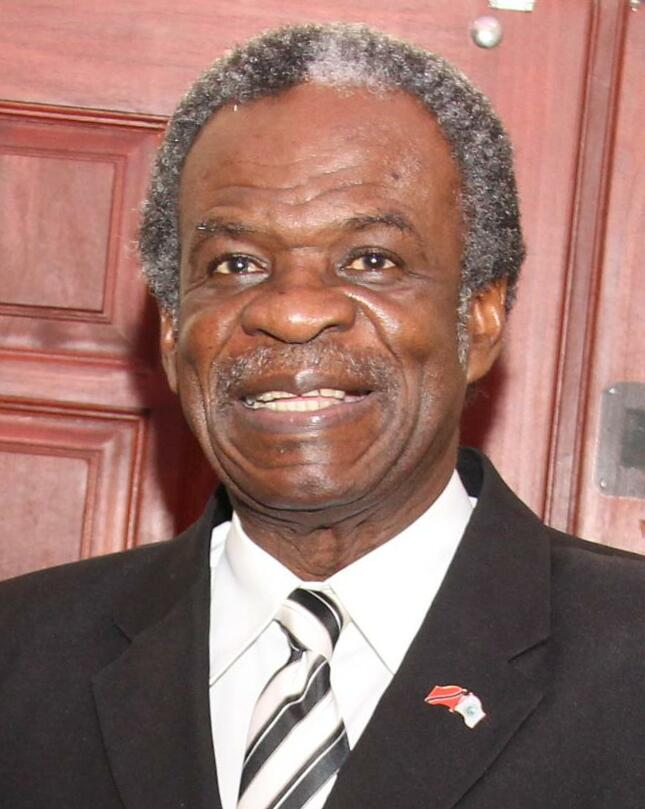
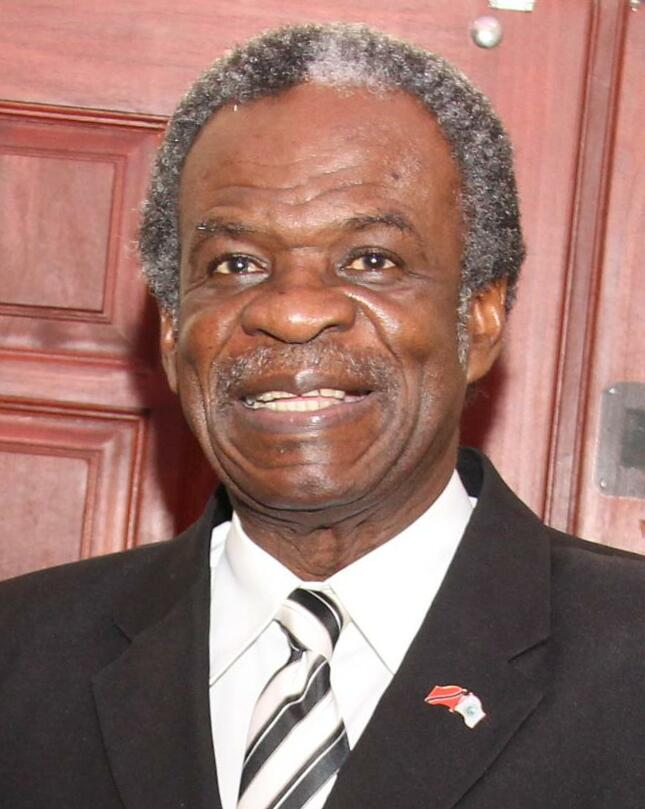
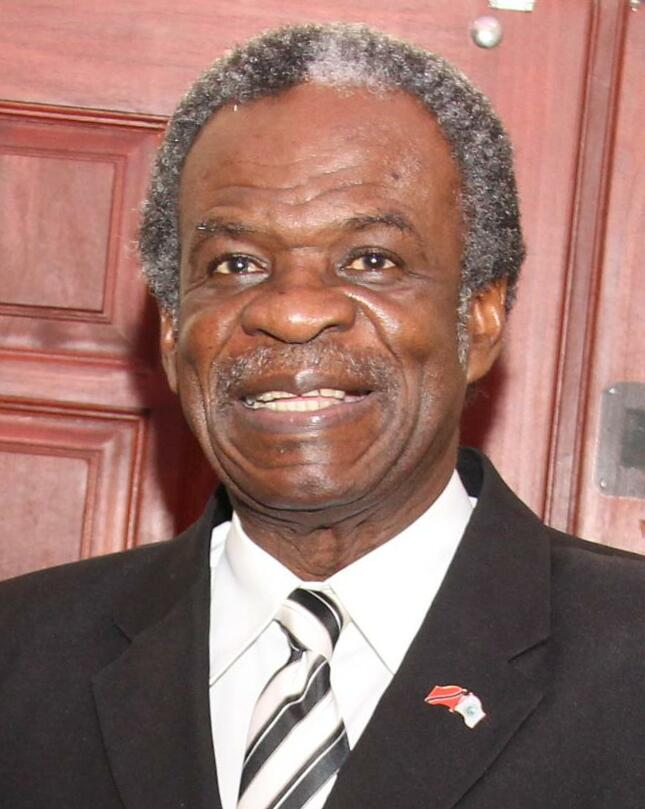
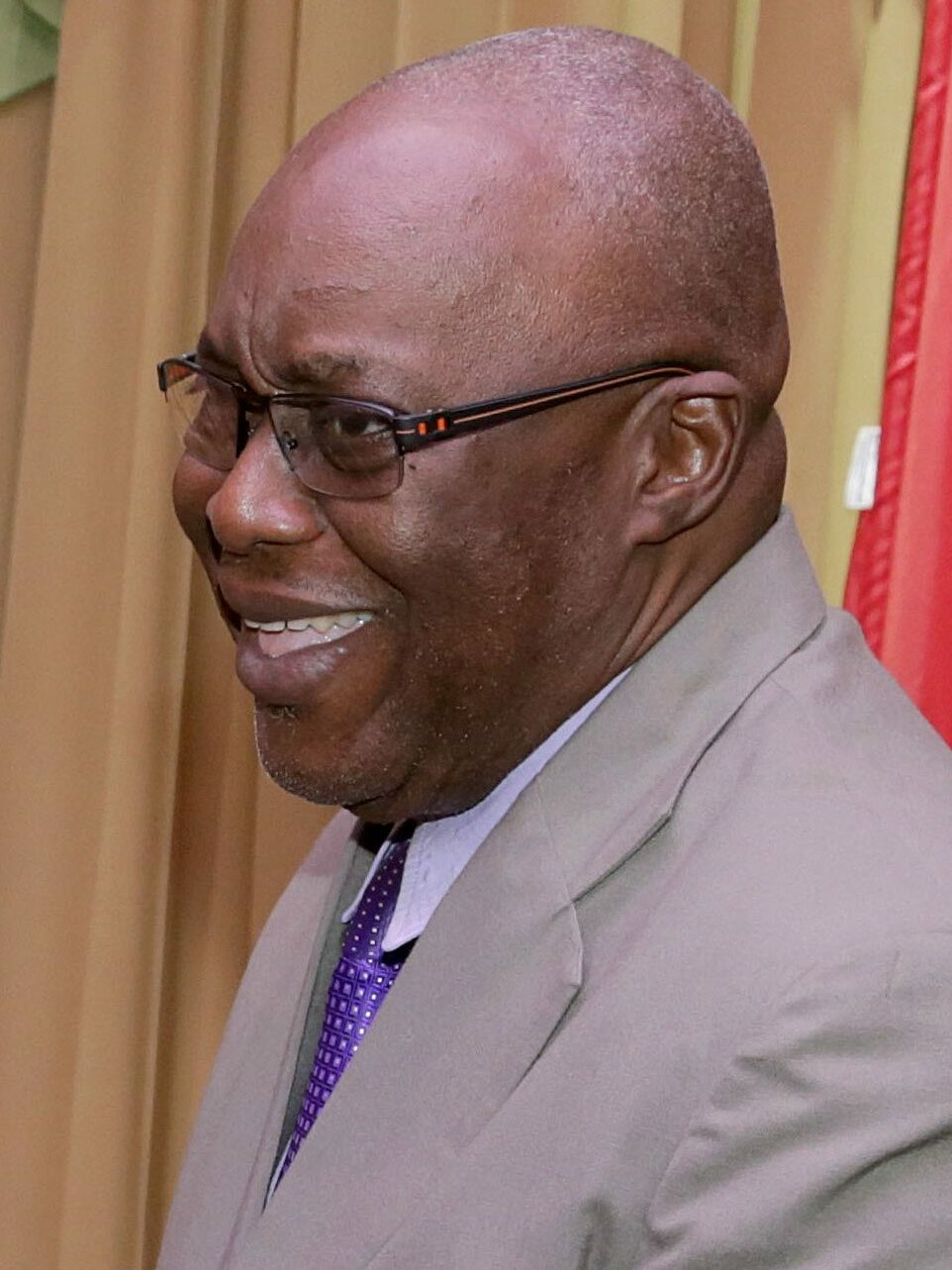
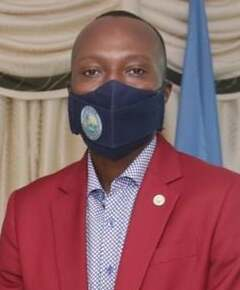
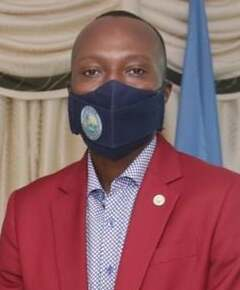
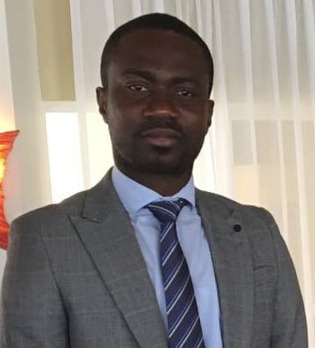
Election Year		Chairman	Summary	PNM	DAC	Independent	Total seats
1st	1980	A. N. R. Robinson (1926-2014)	DAC wins control of the House of Assembly under A. N. R. Robinson, forming the first Tobagonian government.	4	8		12
Election Year		Chairman	Summary	PNM	DAC	Independent	Total seats
2nd	1984	A. N. R. Robinson (1926-2014)	DAC forms another government under A. N. R. Robinson. The DAC merges with other political parties to form the NAR.	1	11		12
Election Year		Chairman	Summary	PNM	NAR	Independent	Total seats
3rd	1988	Jefferson Davidson (c. 1938-2023)	NAR forms another government under Jefferson Davidson.	1	11		12
Election Year		Chairman	Summary	PNM	NAR	Independent	Total seats
4th	1992	Lennox Denoon (1930–2007)	NAR forms another government under Lennox Denoon.	1	11		12
Election Year		Chairman	Summary	PNM	NAR	Independent	Total seats
5th	1996	Hochoy Charles (1946–2023)	NAR forms another government under Hochoy Charles.	1	10	1	12
Election Year		Chief Secretary	Summary	PNM	NAR	Independent	Total seats
6th	2001	Orville London (1945– )	PNM forms its first government under Orville London.	8	4		12
Election Year		Chief Secretary	Summary	PNM	DAC	Independent	Total seats
7th	2005	Orville London (1945– )	PNM forms another government under Orville London.	11	1		12
Election Year		Chief Secretary	Summary	PNM	TOP	Independent	Total seats
8th	2009	Orville London (1945– )	PNM forms another government under Orville London.	8	4		12
Election Year		Chief Secretary	Summary	PNM	TOP	Independent	Total seats
9th	2013	Orville London (1945– )	PNM forms another government under Orville London.	12	0		12
Election Year		Chief Secretary	Summary	PNM	PDP	Independent	Total seats
10th	2017	Kelvin Charles (1957– ) Ancil Dennis (1987– )	PNM forms another government under Kelvin Charles.	10	2		12
Election Year		Chief Secretary	Summary	PNM	PDP	Independent	Total seats
11th	2021 (January)	Ancil Dennis (1987– )	First deadlock in the history of the assembly. PNM forms a caretaker government under Ancil Dennis.	6	6		12
Election Year		Chief Secretary	Summary	PNM	PDP	Independent	Total seats
12th	2021 (December)	Farley Chavez Augustine (1985– )	PDP forms its first government under Farley Chavez Augustine.	1	14		15

== See also ==
- Chief Secretary of Tobago
- List of Presiding Officers of the Tobago House of Assembly
- Local government in Trinidad and Tobago
- Politics of Trinidad and Tobago
