= People's National Movement =

Political party in Trinidad and Tobago

- Abbreviation: PNM
- Leader: Pennelope Beckles-Robinson
- General Secretary: Foster Cummings
- Deputy Leaders: Colm Imbert (Legislative Matters); Sanjiv Boodhu (Policy Matters); Jennifer Baptiste-Primus (Party and Election Matters); Shamfa Cudjoe - Lewis (Tobago Council Political Leader)
- Leader in the Senate: Amery Browne
- Leader in the Opposition Chief whip: Marvin Gonzales
- Founder: Eric Williams
- Founded: 24 January 1956; 70 years ago
- Headquarters: Balisier House; 1 Tranquility Street, Port of Spain, Trinidad and Tobago
- Newspaper: MAGNUM (defunct)
- Youth wing: PNM National Youth League
- Women's wing: PNM National Women's League
- Membership (2022): 105,894
- Ideology: Liberalism; Social liberalism Moderate nationalism Secularism
- Political position: Centre to centre-left
- Regional affiliation: West Indies Federal Labour Party (1957–1962)
- Colors: Red
- Devolved or semi-autonomous branches: Tobago Council of the People's National Movement
- Senate: 6 / 31
- House of Representatives: 13 / 41
- Tobago House of Assembly: 0 / 15
- Regional corporations: 7 / 13
- Regional municipalities: 71 / 141
- Indirectly elected mayors: 5 / 7
- Indirectly elected Aldermen: 29 / 56

Election symbol
- Balisier flower

The People's National Movement (PNM) is the longest-serving and oldest active political party in Trinidad and Tobago. The party has dominated national and local politics for much of Trinidad and Tobago's history, contesting all elections since 1956 serving as the nation's governing party or on four occasions, the main opposition. It is one out of the country's two main political parties. There have been five PNM Prime Ministers and multiple ministries. The party espouses the principles of liberalism and generally sits at the centre to centre-left of the political spectrum.

The party was founded in 1956 by Eric Williams, who took inspiration from Norman Manley's democratic socialist centre-left People's National Party in Jamaica. It won the 1956 General Elections and went on to hold power for an unbroken 30 years. After the death of Williams in 1981, George Chambers led the party. The party was defeated in the 1986 General Elections, losing 33–3 to the National Alliance for Reconstruction (NAR). Under the leadership of Patrick Manning, the party returned to power in 1991 following the 1990 attempted coup by the Jamaat al-Muslimeen, but lost power in 1995 to the United National Congress (UNC). The PNM lost again to the UNC in the 2000 General Elections, but a split in the UNC forced new elections in 2001. These elections resulted in an 18–18 tie between the PNM and the UNC, and President Arthur N. R. Robinson appointed Manning as Prime Minister. Manning was unable to elect a Speaker of the House of Representatives, but won an outright majority in new elections held in 2002 and again in 2007, before losing power in 2010. It returned to power in the 2015 general election under Keith Rowley where it had its best result since the 1981 general election, winning 51.7 percent of the popular vote and 23 of the 41 seats. In the 2020 general election, they won the popular vote and a majority in the House of Representatives, winning 22 seats.

The party symbol is the balisier flower (Heliconia bihai) and the Party's political headquarters is known as the "Balisier House" located in Port of Spain. Historically, the PNM has been supported by a majority of Afro–Trinidadians and Tobagonians and the Creole-Mulatto population, thus it is colloquially called the Black Party, the African Party, or the Creole Party. The PNM has its strongest support in cities and urban areas. It was also historically supported by different minorities such as the Chinese, Christian Indians (other than Presbyterian Indians), and Muslims of any ethnicity of the country.

The PNM's signature policies and legislative decisions include independence, writing the Constitution of Trinidad and Tobago, republicanism, the establishment of the Tobago House of Assembly, the Public Transport Service Corporation, the Water Taxi Service, universal preschool, primary and secondary education, universal health care, criminalizing child marriage and decriminalizing cannabis.

The PNM has been in opposition since the 2025 general election. They had previously been in government since the 2015 general election, when the party held an overall majority of 22 out of 41 Members of Parliament in the House of Representatives and 16 out of 31 members of the Senate. The party has 72 out of the 139 local councillors and is in control of seven of the 14 regional corporations since the 2019 Trinidadian local elections. The party also has one out of 12 assembly members in the Tobago House of Assembly since the December 2021 Tobago House of Assembly elections.

Despite not being a socialist party, the PNM was a member of the democratic socialist West Indies Federal Labour Party in the Federal Parliament of the West Indies Federation from 1957 to 1962. The party includes a semi-autonomous Tobagonian branch known as the Tobago Council of the People's National Movement. As of 2025, the PNM has 100,000+ registered members.

== Rise to power ==
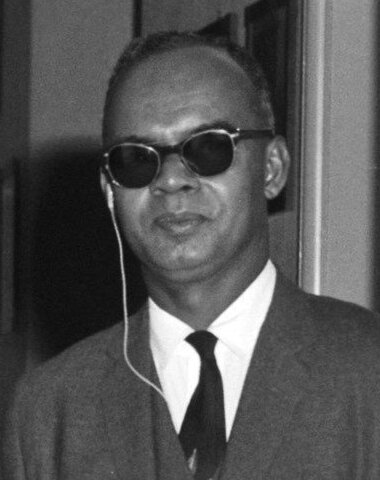
Eric Williams, the first Prime Minister of Trinidad and Tobago (1962–1981) and first leader of the People's National Movement

When Eric Williams returned to Trinidad in 1948 he set about developing a political base. Between 1948 and 1955 he delivered a series of political lectures, under the auspices of the Political Education Movement (PEM) a branch of the Teachers Education and Cultural Association. Naparima College is one of the locations at which such lectures were delivered. On 15 January 1956 Williams launched the PNM. In the 1956 General Elections the PNM captured 13 of the 24 elected seats in the Legislative Council with 38.7% of the votes cast. In order to secure an outright majority in the Legislative Council Williams managed to convince the Secretary of State for the Colonies to allow him to name the five appointed members of the council (despite the opposition of the Governor Sir Edward Betham Beetham). This gave him a clear majority in the Legislative Council. Williams was thus elected Chief Minister and was also able to get all seven of his ministers elected.

In the 1958 Federal Elections (which the PNM contested as part of the West Indies Federal Labour Party), it won four of the 10 Trinidad and Tobago seats with 47.4% of the vote. The Opposition, Democratic Labour Party won the other six seats.

== Independence era ==
In the 1961 General Elections the PNM won 20 of 30 seats with 58% of the vote. With the collapse of the West Indian Federation, the PNM led Trinidad and Tobago to independence on 31 August 1962.

In the 1966 General Elections the PNM won 24 of 36 seats, with 52% of the vote. However, economic and social discontent grew under PNM rule. This came to a climax in April 1970 with the Black Power Revolution. On 13 April, PNM Deputy Leader and Minister of External Affairs A. N. R. Robinson resigned from the party and government. On 20 April, facing a revolt by a portion of the Army in collusion with the growing Black Power movement, Williams declared a State of Emergency. By 22 April, the mutineers had begun negotiations for surrender. Following this certain ministers were forced to resign including John O'Halloran, Minister of Industry and Gerard Montano, Minister of Home Affairs.

In the 1971 General Elections the PNM faced only limited opposition as the major opposition parties boycotted the election citing the use of voting machines. The PNM captured all 36 seats in the election, including eight that they carried unopposed. Additionally, Williams split the post of Deputy Leader into three and appointed Kamaluddin Mohammed, Errol Mahabir and George Chambers to the position.

In 1972, J. R. F. Richardson crossed the floor and declared himself an independent. He was subsequently appointed Leader of the Opposition. He was soon joined by another MP, Dr. Horace Charles.

In 1973, the PNM faced a major crisis. On 28 September Williams announced that he would not stand for re-election. This led to a race to succeed him as Political Leader of the party. By 18 November 250 of 476 registered party groups had submitted nominations, 224 of them for Attorney General Karl Hudson-Phillips and 26 for Minister of Health, Kamaluddin Mohammed. Williams announced on 2 December that he would return as Political Leader and Hudson-Phillips was forced out of the party.

== Decline and fall ==
In 1976 the PNM won 24 of 36 seats with 54% of the vote. In March 1978, Hector McClean, Minister of Works, resigned from the party and government and declared himself an independent MP.

On 29 March 1981, Eric Williams died. Williams had maintained an iron grip over the party and forced all potential rivals out of the party. In the absence of a clear successor, President Ellis Clarke was left to choose the new Prime Minister from among the three Deputy Political Leaders of the party. Clarke appointed George Chambers Prime Minister in preference to Kamaluddin Mohammed and Errol Mahabir. Chambers was subsequently elected as Political Leader of the PNM and led the party to victory in the 1981 General Elections. The PNM won 26 of 36 seats and 52% of the vote.

It subsequently held on to power until 1986 when it was defeated by the National Alliance for Reconstruction (NAR) under the leadership of A. N. R. Robinson. The PNM won three of 36 seats, with 32% of the vote. Chambers resigned and was succeeded by Patrick Manning as Political Leader.

== Manning and the PNM re-invented ==
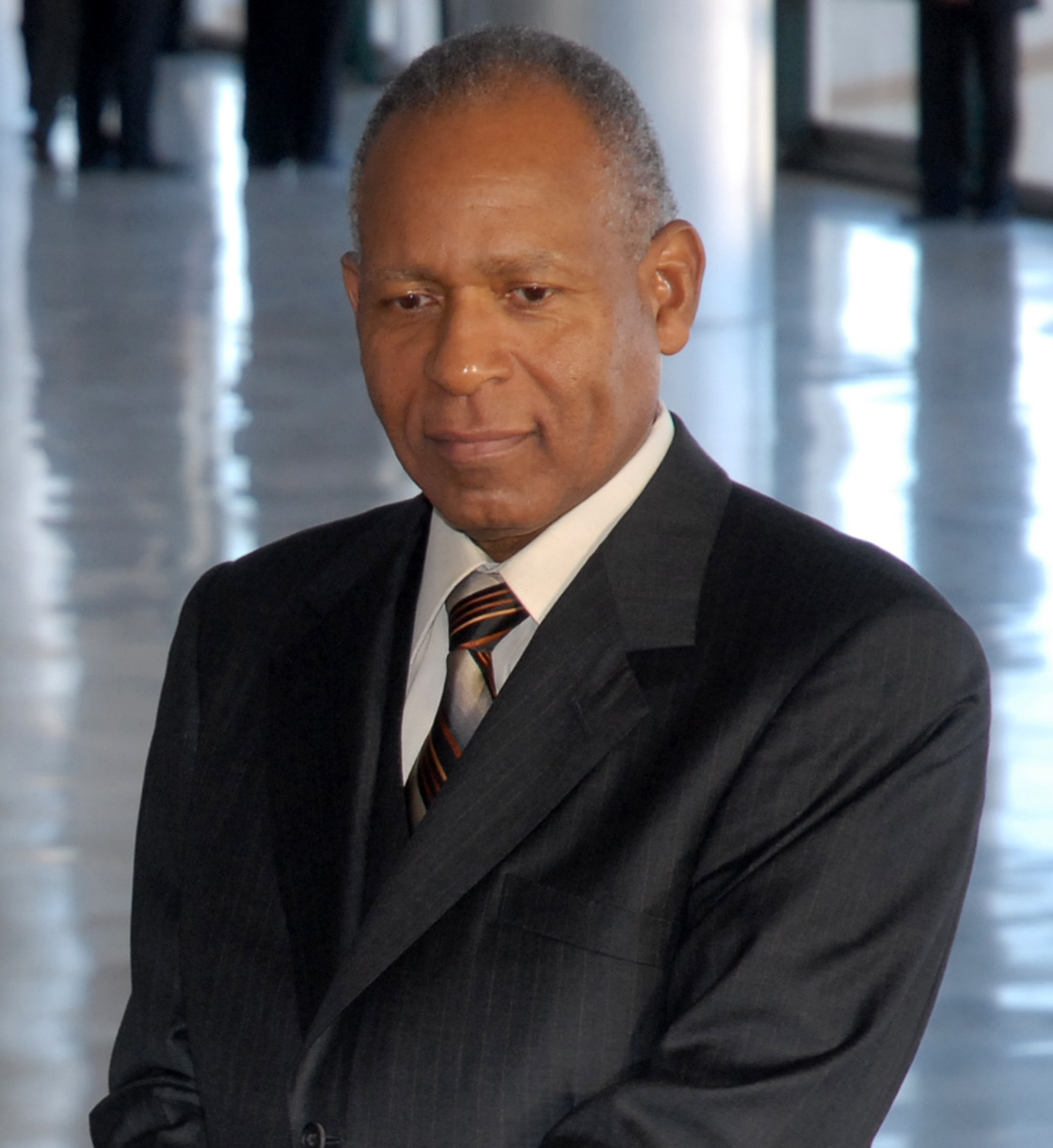
Patrick Manning, the fourth Prime Minister of Trinidad and Tobago (1991–1995; 2001–2010) and third leader of the People's National Movement

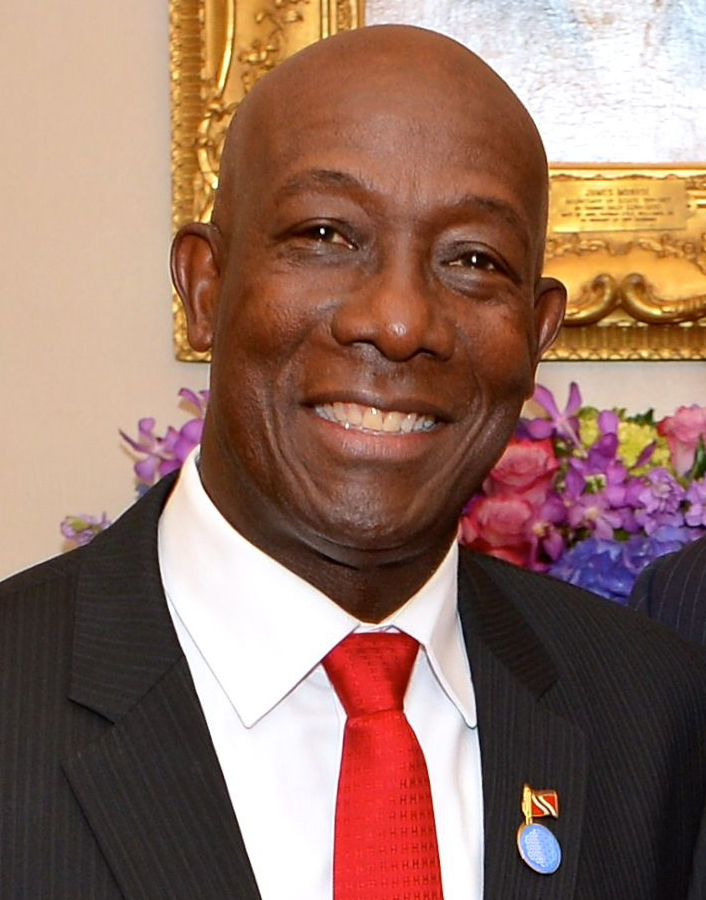
Keith Rowley, the seventh Prime Minister of Trinidad and Tobago (2015–2025) and fourth leader of the People's National Movement

When Manning became leader he promised a "new PNM" and purposely ignored the discredited old guard. He appointed Wendell Mottley, Keith Rowley and Augustus Ramrekersingh as his deputy leaders.

The PNM was returned to power in the 1991 elections after the NAR self-destructed. In the 1991 election it won 21 of 36 seats with 45% of the vote. However, in the latter half of that term the party became unstable. It lost one seat in a by-election and another when Ralph Maraj defected to the United National Congress. The issue that led Maraj to defect was the declaration of a limited State of Emergency which sole purpose was to remove Occah Seepaul (Maraj's sister) as Speaker of the House of Representatives. The party also suffered a loss of support with the death Minister of Public Utilities, Morris Marshall, a favourite of the party grassroots. Attempting to halt the decline in party support Manning called an early "snap election" in 1995 . Many party front-benchers did not seek reelection including Finance Minister Wendell Mottley.

The party lost the 1995 General Elections winning 17 of 36 seats with 48% of the vote. The United National Congress (UNC) under the leadership of Basdeo Panday also won 17 seats and formed a coalition government with the National Alliance for Reconstruction which had won the remaining two seats. The PNM was further weakened when two MPs resigned from the party and threw their support behind the UNC government. This led to numerous calls for Manning to resign the party leadership, and for calls for Mottley to replace him. Manning declined to resign and Mottley appeared to have taken a sabbatical from politics. When leadership elections were held in 1997 Manning was challenged by Keith Rowley. Manning was returned as Political Leader.

In 2000 the PNM suffered another defeat, winning 16 of 36 seats with 46% of the vote. Another election was held in 2001 which resulted in a tie with both the PNM and UNC winning 18 seats, the PNM with 46% of the electoral vote and the UNC with 50%. However President Arthur N.R. Robinson appointed Manning as Prime Minister on the basis of "moral and spiritual grounds". (In Trinidad and Tobago's elections, the number of seats needed to occupy the lower house is really the best indicator of whether or not a party would win elections). Unable to elect a Speaker, Manning advised the President to prorogue Parliament. On 7 October 2002 General Elections were held in which the PNM won 50.7% of popular votes and 20 out of 36 seats.

== In government (2015–2025) ==
The PNM won a majority government in the 2015 Trinidad and Tobago general election. On 9 September 2015, Keith Rowley was sworn in as the new Prime Minister, following the election victory of the PNM. In August 2020, the governing PNM won the following general election, leading to the incumbent Prime Minister Keith Rowley serving a second term. He resigned in March 2025 and was succeeded by Stuart Young. He led the party into the 2025 Trinidad and Tobago general election. In the election the party was defeated by the United National Congress.

== Leaders ==
The political leaders of the People's National Movement have been as follows (any acting leaders indicated in italics):

Key:
PNM UNC NAR
PM: Prime Minister
LO: Leader of the Opposition
†: Died in office

Leader		Term of Office		Position	Prime Minister
1	Eric Williams	24 January 1956	29 March 1981†	PM 1955–1981	himself
2	George Chambers	30 March 1981	8 February 1987	PM 1981–1986	himself
3	Patrick Manning	8 February 1987	26 May 2010	LO 1986–1991	Robinson
3	Patrick Manning	8 February 1987	26 May 2010	PM 1991–1995	himself
3	Patrick Manning	8 February 1987	26 May 2010	LO 1995–2001	Panday
3	Patrick Manning	8 February 1987	26 May 2010	PM 2001–2010	himself
4	Keith Rowley	26 May 2010	1 May 2025	LO 2010–2015	Persad-Bissessar
4	Keith Rowley	26 May 2010	1 May 2025	PM 2015–2025	himself
5	Pennelope Beckles-Robinson	29 June 2025	Incumbent	LO 2025–present	Persad-Bissessar

== Deputy leaders of the People's National Movement ==
The deputy political leaders of the People's National Movement have been as follows (any acting leaders indicated in italics):

Deputy Leader	Term		Concurrent Office(s)	Deputy Leader	Term		Concurrent Office(s)	Deputy Leader	Term		Concurrent Office(s)	Deputy Leader	Term		Concurrent Office(s)	Leader(s)
Patrick Solomon (1910-1997) MP for Port of Spain South	1956	1966	Minister of Education and Culture; Minister of Home Affairs; Deputy Prime Minister; Minister of External Affairs													Williams
A. N. R. Robinson (1926-2014) MP for Tobago East	1967	1970														Williams
George Chambers (1928-1997) MP for St. Ann's East	1971	30 March 1981		Errol Mahabir (1931-2015) MP for San Fernando West	1971			Kamaluddin Mohammed (1927-2015)MP for Barataria	1971							Williams
Keith Rowley (born 1949) MP for Diego Martin West	1987	1995		Wendell Mottley (born 1941) MP for St. Ann's East				Augustus Ramrekersingh (born )MP for St. Joseph			Minister of Education					Manning
Joan Yuille-Williams (born ) (party and elections)	1996	14 January 2023	Minister of Community Development, Culture and Gender Affairs	Kenneth Valley (1948-2011) MP for Diego Martin Central				Nafeesa Mohammed (born )	1997	2011	Opposition Senator	Orville London (born 1945) (Tobago) AM for Scarborough/Calder Hall	1998	3 July 2016	Chief Secretary of Tobago	Manning
Joan Yuille-Williams (born ) (party and elections)	1996	14 January 2023		Rohan Sinanan (born ) (policy (2010-2023) (party and election matters (2023-present)		Incumbent	Minister of Works and Transport; Government Senator	Marlene McDonald (born ) (legislation) MP for Port of Spain South		13 August 2019	Minister of Public Administration; Minister of Public Utilities; Minister of Housing and Urban Development; Minister of Community Development, Culture and Gender Affairs	Orville London (born 1945) (Tobago) AM for Scarborough/Calder Hall	1998	3 July 2016	Chief Secretary of Tobago	Manning
Joan Yuille-Williams (born ) (party and elections)	1996	14 January 2023		Rohan Sinanan (born ) (policy (2010-2023) (party and election matters (2023-present)		Incumbent	Minister of Works and Transport; Government Senator	Marlene McDonald (born ) (legislation) MP for Port of Spain South		13 August 2019	Minister of Public Administration; Minister of Public Utilities; Minister of Housing and Urban Development; Minister of Community Development, Culture and Gender Affairs	Orville London (born 1945) (Tobago) AM for Scarborough/Calder Hall	1998	3 July 2016	Chief Secretary of Tobago	Rowley
Joan Yuille-Williams (born ) (party and elections)	1996	14 January 2023		Rohan Sinanan (born ) (policy (2010-2023) (party and election matters (2023-present)		Incumbent	Minister of Works and Transport; Government Senator	Fitzgerald Hinds (born 1956) (legislation) MP for Laventille West	10 November 2019	14 January 2023	Minister in the Attorney General's Ministry	Kelvin Charles (born 1957) (Tobago) AM for Black Rock/Whim/Spring Garden	3 July 2016	26 January 2020	Chief Secretary of Tobago	Rowley
Joan Yuille-Williams (born ) (party and elections)	1996	14 January 2023		Rohan Sinanan (born ) (policy (2010-2023) (party and election matters (2023-present)		Incumbent	Minister of Works and Transport; Government Senator	Fitzgerald Hinds (born 1956) (legislation) MP for Laventille West	10 November 2019	14 January 2023	Minister in the Attorney General's Ministry	Tracy Davidson-Celestine (born 1978) (Tobago)	26 January 2020	1 May 2022		Rowley

=== Tobago Council leaders ===
The deputy political leaders who additionally served as the political leaders of the Tobago Council of the People's National Movement have been as follows (any acting leaders indicated in italics):

Key:
PNM PDP
MaL: Majority Leader
MiL: Minority Leader

Leader		Term		Position	Chief Secretary
1	Orville London	2001	3 July 2016	MaL 2001–2017	himself
2	Kelvin Charles	3 July 2016	26 January 2020	MaL 2017–2020	himself
3	Tracy Davidson-Celestine	26 January 2020 (Elected)	1 May 2022	None (lost the December 2021 Tobago House of Assembly election for her electoral district)	Kelvin Charles
3	Tracy Davidson-Celestine	26 January 2020 (Elected)	1 May 2022	None (lost the December 2021 Tobago House of Assembly election for her electoral district)	Ancil Dennis
3	Tracy Davidson-Celestine	26 January 2020 (Elected)	1 May 2022	None (lost the December 2021 Tobago House of Assembly election for her electoral district)	Farley Chavez Augustine
4	Ancil Dennis	1 May 2022 (Elected)		None (lost the December 2021 Tobago House of Assembly election for his electoral district)	Farley Chavez Augustine

== PNM Leadership Executive Committee ==
Position		Officeholder
Political Leader		Penelope Beckles-Robinson
Chairman		Marvin Gonzales
Lady Vice-Chairman		Nyan Gadsby-Dolly
Vice-Chairman		Amery Browne
Deputy Political Leader	Legislative Matters	Colm Imbert
Deputy Political Leader	Policy Matters	Sanjiv Boodhu
Deputy Political Leader	Party and Election Matters	Jennifer Baptiste-Primus
Deputy Political Leader	Tobago Council Political Leader	Ancil Dennis
General Secretary		Foster Cummings
Assistant General Secretary		Patricia Alexis
Treasurer		Nal Ramsingh
Public Relations Officer		Faris Al-Rawi
Education Officer		Jelani Reid
Labour Relations Officer		Kenneth Deoraj
Elections Officer		Indar Parasram
Field Officer		Curtis Shade
Welfare Officer		Maxine Richards
Youth Officer		Kareem Marcelle
Operations Officer		Irene Hinds
Social Media Officer		Symon De Nobriga

== Youth Arm ==
Position	Officeholder
Chairperson	Patrick Phillip

== Women's Arm ==
Position	Officeholder
Chairwoman	Camille Robinson-Regis

== Tobago Council of the People's National Movement ==
Tobago House of Assembly Seats
- Tobago House of Assembly: 0 / 15

Tobago has its own PNM party with separate memberships, constituency associations, executives, offices and a political leader. In the 2026 Tobago House of Assembly election, the PNM's sole elected member of the Tobago House of Assembly (THA), Kelvon Morris, lost his seat and the PNM were also defeated in every other electoral district, leaving the party with no representation in the THA.

Party	Leader	Last election			Government
Party	Leader	Year	Votes (%)	Seats	Government
Tobago Council of the PNM	Ancil Dennis	2026	TBC	0 / 15	Tobago People's Party

== Election results ==
=== House of Representatives ===
Red indicates seats won by the PNM in the 2020 Trinidad and Tobago general election.

View source data.

Election	Party leader	Votes			Seats		Position	Government
Election	Party leader	No.	%	±	No.	±	Position	Government
1956	Eric Williams	105,513	39.8%	—	13 / 24	▲13	1st	PNM
1961	Eric Williams	190,003	57.0%	▲17.2	20 / 30	▲7	1st	PNM
1966	Eric Williams	158,573	52.4%	▼4.6	24 / 36	▲4	1st	PNM
1971	Eric Williams	99,723	84.1%	▲31.7	36 / 36	▲12	1st	PNM
1976	Eric Williams	169,194	54.2%	▼29.9	24 / 36	▼12	1st	PNM
1981	George Chambers	218,557	52.9%	▼1.3	26 / 36	▲2	1st	PNM
1986	George Chambers	183,635	32.0%	▼20.9	3 / 36	▼23	▼2nd	NAR
1991	Patrick Manning	233,150	45.1%	▲13.1	21 / 36	▲18	▲1st	PNM
1995	Patrick Manning	256,159	48.8%	▲3.7	17 / 36	▼4	1st	UNC–NAR
2000	Patrick Manning	276,334	46.5%	▼2.3	16 / 36	▼1	▼2nd	UNC
2001	Patrick Manning	260,075	46.5%	Steady	18 / 36	▲2	2nd	PNM Minority
2002	Patrick Manning	308,762	50.9%	▲4.4	20 / 36	▲2	▲1st	PNM
2007	Patrick Manning	299,813	45.85%	▼5.05	26 / 41	▲6	1st	PNM
2010	Patrick Manning	285,354	39.65%	▼6.2	12 / 41	▼14	▼2nd	PP
2015	Keith Rowley	378,447	51.68%	▲12.03	23 / 41	▲11	▲1st	PNM
2020	Keith Rowley	322,250	49.08%	▼2.6	22 / 41	▼1	1st	PNM
2025	Stuart Young	224,403	36.18%	▼12.9	13 / 41	▼9	▼2nd	COI

=== West Indies ===
View source data.

Election	Party Group	Leader	Votes		Seats		Position	Government
Election	Party Group	Leader	No.	Share	No.	Share	Position	Government
1958	WIFLP	Eric Williams	119,527	47.4%	4 / 10	40.0%	2nd	WIFLP

=== Corporations ===
Red indicates seats and corporations won by the PNM in the 2019 Trinidadian local elections.

View source data.

Election		Votes			Councillors		Corporations	
Election	Leader	No.	Vote share	±	No.	±	No.	±
1959	Eric Williams	140,275	48.1%	—	33 / 72	▲33	?	
1968	Eric Williams	?	49.4%	▲1.3%	68 / 100	▲35	?	
1971	Eric Williams	12,287	52.1%	▲2.7%	90 / 100	▲22	?	
1977	Eric Williams	64,725	51.1%	▼1.0%	68 / 100	▼22	?	
1980	Eric Williams	74,667	57.8%	▲6.7%	100 / 113	▲31	11 / 11	
1983	George Chambers	?	39.1%	▼18.7%	54 / 120	▼46	5 / 11	▼6
1987	Patrick Manning	?	39.3%	▲0.2%	46 / 125	▼8	3 / 11	▼2
1992	Patrick Manning	154.818	50.3%	▲11.0%	86 / 139	▲40	10 / 14	▲7
1996	Patrick Manning	155,585	43.7%	▼6.6%	63 / 124	▼23	7 / 14	▼3
1999	Patrick Manning	157,631	46.6%	▲2.6%	67 / 124	▲4	7 / 14	Steady
2003	Patrick Manning	172,525	53.3%	▲6.4%	83 / 126	▲16	9 / 14	▲2
2010	Keith Rowley	130,505	33.6%	▼19.7%	36 / 134	▼47	5 / 14	▼4
2013	Keith Rowley	190,421	42.3%	▲8.7%	84 / 136	▲48	8 / 14	▲3
2016	Keith Rowley	174,754	48.2%	▲5.9%	83 / 137	▼1	8 / 14	Steady
2019	Keith Rowley	161,962	43.5%	▼4.7%	72 / 139	▼9	7 / 14	▼1
2023	Keith Rowley	130,868	39.5%	▼4.1%	70 / 141	▼2	7 / 14	Steady

=== Tobago House of Assembly ===
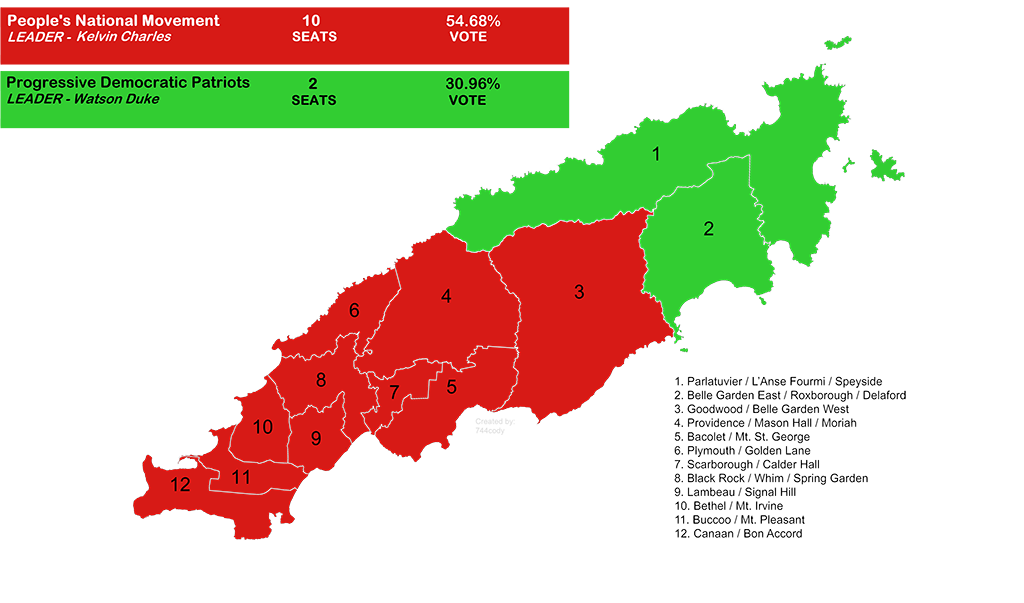
Red indicates seats won by the PNM in the 2017 Tobago House of Assembly election.

View source data.

Election	Leader	Votes			Seats		Position	Government
Election	Leader	No.	%	±	No.	±	Position	Government
1980	Eric Williams (National party leader)	7,097	44.4	—	4 / 12	▲4	2nd	DAC
1984	George Chambers (National party leader)	8,200	41.4	▼3.0	1 / 12	▼3	2nd	DAC
1988	Patrick Manning (National party leader)	5,977	35.8	▼5.6	1 / 12	Steady	2nd	DAC
1992	Patrick Manning (National party leader)	6,555	36.7	▲0.9	1 / 12	Steady	2nd	NAR
1996	Patrick Manning (National party leader)	5,023	33.6	▼4.1	1 / 12	Steady	2nd	NAR
2001	Orville London	10,500	46.7	▲13.3	8 / 12	▲7	▲1st	PNM
2005	Orville London	12,137	58.4	▲11.7	11 / 12	▲3	1st	PNM
2009	Orville London	12,311	51.2	▼7.2	8 / 12	▼3	1st	PNM
2013	Orville London	19,976	61.2	▲10.0	12 / 12	▲4	1st	PNM
2017	Kelvin Charles	13,310	54.7	▼6.5	10 / 12	▼2	1st	PNM
January 2021	Tracy Davidson-Celestine	13,288	50.4	▼4.3	6 / 12	▼4	1st	Caretaker
December 2021	Tracy Davidson-Celestine	11,943*	40.8*	▼9.6*	1 / 15	▼5	▼2nd	PDP

== See also ==
- 2022 People's National Movement leadership election
- 2020 Tobago Council of the People's National Movement leadership election
