= Democratic Action Congress =

Political party in Trinidad and Tobago

The Democratic Action Congress (DAC) was a Tobago-based political party in Trinidad and Tobago.

== History ==
The party was established in 1971 by A. N. R. Robinson, and was originally an autonomist party. It first contested general elections in 1976, in which it won both Tobago seats, taken by Robinson and Winston Murray. The party went on to dominate the Tobago House of Assembly, and retained both seats in the 1981 elections.

In 1986 the party merged into the National Alliance for Reconstruction. However, after the NAR lost control of the Tobago House of Assembly in 2001, an attempt was made to oust Hochoy Charles as the NAR leader in Tobago in 2004. As a result, Charles left the NAR and re-formed the DAC. In the 2005 elections the DAC routed the NAR (which was reduced to just 113 votes), but only won a single seat.

In the 2007 national general elections the party failed to win a seat, despite forming an alliance known as the Tobago United Front. From this grouping emerged a new party— the Tobago Organisation of the People. Whilst the majority of the DAC supported the merger, Charles withdrew from the merger claiming that the DAC still existed as a separate organisation. However, it did not put forward any candidates for the 2009 elections.
