= Arima (parliamentary constituency) =

Parliamentary Constituency of Trinidad and Tobago

- Constituency for the Parliament of Trinidad and Tobago
- Electorate: 25,555 (2015)

Current constituency
- Created: 1961
- Number of members: 1
- Member of Parliament: Pennelope Beckles (PNM)

Arima is a parliamentary electoral district in Trinidad and Tobago in the north of Trinidad, including part of the borough of Arima. It is currently represented by Pennelope Beckles.

This constituency was created by the Boundaries Commission prior to the 1961 Trinidad and Tobago general election. In 2004, five polling divisions were removed from the district to create the constituency of D'Abadie/O'Meara and one polling division was removed to create La Horquetta/Talparo for the 2007 Trinidad and Tobago general election. It was previously considered to be a safe PNM seat, but was won by the COP in the 2010 general election.

== Members of Parliament ==
This constituency has elected the following members of the House of Representatives of Trinidad and Tobago:

Election	Years	Member	Party	Notes
1961	4 December 1961 – 7 November 1966	Clytus Arnold Thomasos	PNM	
1966	7 November 1966 – 13 September 1976	Maxwell Phillip Awon	PNM	
1976	13 September 1976 – 9 November 1981	Felix G.E. Bellamy	PNM	
1981	9 November 1981 – 15 December 1986	Ashton Ford	PNM	
1986	15 December 1986 – 16 December 1991	Gloria Thomasos-Pollard	NAR	
1991	16 December 1991 – 11 December 2000	Rupert Griffith	PNM	
2000	11 December 2000 – 24 May 2010	Pennelope Beckles	PNM	
2010	24 May 2010 – 7 September 2015	Rodger Dominic Samuel	COP	
2015	7 September 2015 – 10 August 2020	Anthony Garcia	PNM	
2020	10 August 2020 – Present	Pennelope Beckles	PNM	

== Election results ==
=== Elections in the 2020s ===
2025 Trinidad and Tobago general election: Arima
Party	Candidate	Votes	%	±%
PNM	Pennelope Beckles-Robinson	7,055	49.8%	▼19.25
UNC	Nigel Moses	6,356	44.9%	▲16.2
PF	Jemima Lezama-Redhead	520	3.7%	Steady
NTA	Shekhina Sirju	152	1.1%	Steady
THC	Marcus Ramkissoon	27	0.2%	Steady
NCT	Nalini Dial	38	0.3%	Steady
Majority		699	4.9	
Turnout		14,167	49.19%	
Registered electors		28,802		
PNM hold				

General election 2020: Arima
Party	Candidate	Votes	%	±%
PNM	Pennelope Beckles	9,293	69.05	
UNC	Flora Singh	3,905	29.02	
PEP	Sharon Hernandez	212	1.58	
NCT	Nalini Dial	48	0.36	
Majority		5,388	40.04	
Turnout		13,458	51.01	
PNM hold		Swing		

=== Elections in the 2010s ===
General election 2015: Arima
Party	Candidate	Votes	%	±%
PNM	Anthony Garcia	10,879	69.27	
COP	Rodger Dominic Samuel	4,578	29.15	
ILP	Donna Maxentia Jennings	248	1.58	
Majority		6,301	40.12	
Turnout		15,705	61.46	
PNM gain from COP		Swing		

General election 2010: Arima
Party	Candidate	Votes	%	±%
COP	Rodger Dominic Samuel	7,610	50.29	
PNM	Laurel Lezama	7,246	47.89	
NNV	Justin Gibbs	201	1.33	
Majority		364	2.41	
Turnout		15,130	62.74	
COP gain from PNM		Swing		
