= Anthony Williams (musician) =

Trinidad and Tobago musician (1931–2021)

Anthony Williams, ORTT, CM (24 June 1931 – 21 December 2021), also known as "Muffman", was an inventor, pioneer and musician of the steel pan.

== Life ==
Williams was born on 24 June 1931, at the General Hospital in Port-of-Spain, Trinidad and Tobago and grew up in Nepal Street, St. James. He was initiated as a player of the steelpan in the band, "Five Graves to Cairo" of Carlton Street, St. James. At the age of 12, he played with Harlem Nightingale Steelband, for the first street Carnival, which was held after World War II.

Williams went on to become the leading Ping Pong player in the band Sun Valleyians, which comprised a group of teenagers and grew to become the legendary steel orchestra, Sun Valley.

Williams was a recipient of the Chaconia Medal (Gold) and the Order of the Republic of Trinidad and Tobago from the Government of Trinidad and Tobago.

Williams was a pioneer of the steel pan, along with Winston "Spree" Simon, Ellie Mannette and Neville Jules. Williams was part of the Trinidad All Steel Percussion Orchestra, TASPO, which visited England for the Festival of Britain in 1951.

In 1953, Williams presented a soprano pan with the notes laid out in a circle of fifths. Because the instrument's surface looked like a spider's web, he called it the "Spider Web Pan".

He was the bandleader, pan-tuner and arranger of the Pan Am North Stars and won the Panorama twice, once in 1963 and again in 1964.

Williams received the Chaconia Medal (Gold) in 1992.

He further received the Order of the Republic of Trinidad and Tobago, presented by President George Maxwell Richards in 2008.

On 21 December 2021, Williams died at the age of 90 from complications of COVID-19.
