= 2003 Trinidad and Tobago presidential election =

- 14 February 2003

68 members of the Parliament of Trinidad and Tobago 35 electoral votes needed to win
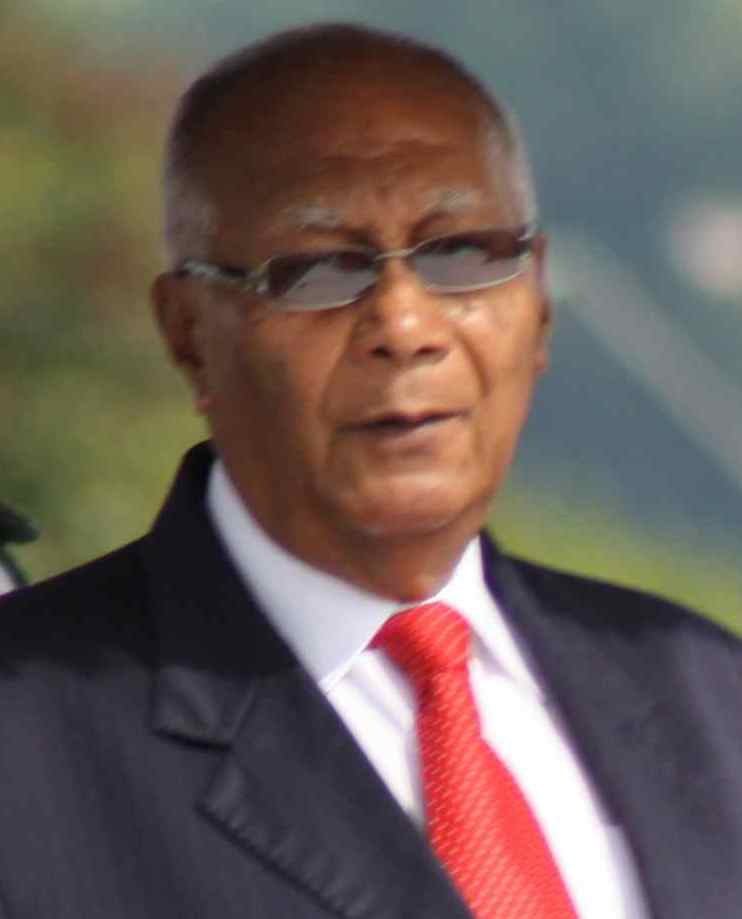
Nominee	George Maxwell Richards	Ganace Ramdial
Party	Independent	Independent
Electoral vote	43	25
President before election
A. N. R. Robinson
Independent
Elected President
George Maxwell Richards
Independent

Indirect presidential elections were held in Trinidad and Tobago on 14 February 2003.

The incumbent A. N. R. Robinson was eligible for re-election, but opted not to stand, as he was retiring from politics.

The election was held through an electoral college consisting of a joint sitting of the two houses of parliament.

The governing People's National Movement nominated chemical engineer George Maxwell Richards for the position, while the opposition United National Congress nominated Ganace Ramdial, a banker and legal consultant who had served as the President of the Senate from 1995 to 2002.

== Results ==
Candidate	Party	Votes	%
George Maxwell Richards	Independent	43	63.24
Ganace Ramdial	Independent	25	36.76
Total		68	100.00
Valid votes		68	100.00
Invalid/blank votes		0	0.00
Total votes		68	100.00
Registered voters/turnout		68	100.00
