= Laventille =

Suburb of Port of Spain in Trinidad and Tobago

- Town
- Location of Laventille, Trinidad and Tobago Laventille (the Caribbean)
- Coordinates: 10°39′N 61°29′W
- Country: Trinidad and Tobago
- Region: San Juan-Laventille
- Named for: Local winds

Population (2011)
  - Total: 21,454
- Postal Code(s): 26xxxx

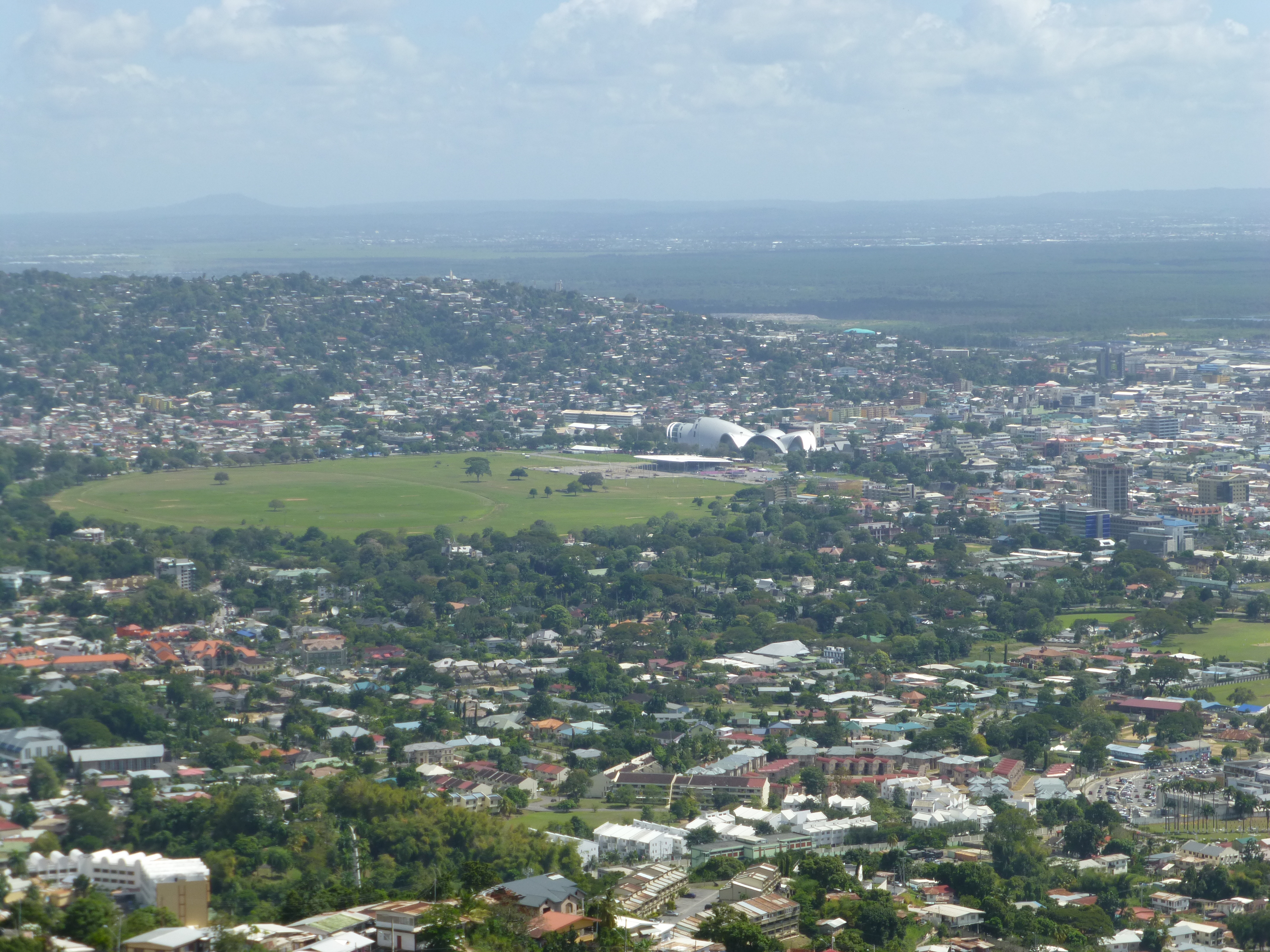
An aerial view of Laventille and surrounding areas

Laventille is a suburb of Port of Spain in Trinidad and Tobago. It is administered by the San Juan–Laventille Regional Corporation.

== Etymology ==
The name Laventille hearkens back to colonial times, especially when the French dominated the cultural traditions of the island. One etymological derivation of the name is that the northeast trade winds come to this part of the island of Trinidad before reaching any other part of colonial Port of Spain – hence the metaphorical name "La Ventaille" ("The Fan"). Geographically, it is the source of orographic precipitation for the capital city.

== Arts and culture ==
Laventille is the place where steel pan was born, and the birthplace of innovative world-renowned tuners such as Rudolph Charles and Bertie Marshall.

As the heart of the steelpan world, this is where pioneer Winston "Spree" Simon lived and created one of the century's new acoustical musical instruments. Laventille is the original home to Desperadoes Steel Orchestra, one of the world's oldest steelbands, still in existence today, along with several other bands such as Laventille Hilanders, Courts Laventille Sound Specialists and Carib Tokyo.

Laventille is also the birthplace of other notable people, including Soca artist Destra Garcia, actor Sullivan Walker, former US ambassador to T&T and Sergeant major of the Marine Corps John L. Estrada, boxer Leslie Stewart, rapso artist Brother Resistance and footballer Travis Mulraine.

=== Events ===
==== Angostura Champions Award ====
In 2018 the Angostura Champions awards were launched by the House of Angostura. These biennial awards celebrate those who perform exemplary feats of community service, in working to uplift the lives of others in Trinidad and Tobago. They endeavour to showcase a chosen champion's outstanding societal contributions to collectively encourage a sense of service. Koriella Espinoza was the first person to be bestowed with this honour.

== Academics ==
Laventille is home to Laventille Girls Government Primary School, St Barbs Government Primary School and Laventille Boys Government Primary School. Success Laventille Secondary School is also situated within this said locale. Success Laventille's notable alumni include molecular biologist Dr Nigel Austin, 2014 Digicel Rising Stars winner Neisha Guy, and cricketers Akeal Hosein, Kieron Pollard and Khary Pierre.

== Economy ==
The world famous Angostura Bitters is currently produced at the Angostura compound, which is located off the Eastern Main Road in Laventille. This product is one of the older products of Trinidad and Tobago, which has won many awards and been exported to many countries. The bitters forms an essential element in many drinks and dishes.

Many of the rums that are produced in Trinidad are made at the Angostura Compound. These rums are exported to many countries and earn valuable foreign exchange for the country. They are also used in ponche de crème, the local equivalent of egg nog.

For many years, MacFoods Meat processors was one of the larger employers in the area, as their factory produced top quality pork hams, marketed under the label "Blue Ribbon" hams.

== Places of interest ==
=== Angostura Museum and Barcant Butterfly Collection ===
The Angostura Museum and Barcant Butterfly Collection are located in the Angostura compound, Eastern Main Road, Laventille. The compound covers 20 acres of land at Trinity Avenue and Eastern Main Road, on the outskirts of Port of Spain, heading towards Morvant.

=== Fernandes Industrial Centre (FIC) ===
The Fernandes Industrial Centre (FIC) is located along the Eastern Main Road, close to the Morvant Junction. It offers warehousing, distribution and operating space for several different types of businesses, including the Peter Sheppard Studio, which produces artwork that recreates historical scenes of Trinidad and Tobago, and also the Foundation for the Enhancement and Enrichment of Life. This Non-Governmental Organization (NGO) was founded by Mr Clive Pantin, brother of the late Archbishop Anthony Pantin of the Roman Catholic Archdiocese of Port of Spain, former principal of Fatima College. The organization is engaged in the collection and distribution of food items to those in need and other social services.

== Politics ==
Laventille is covered by two parliamentary constituencies for elections to the House of Representatives: Laventille East/Morvant and Laventille West.
