= Gloria Thomasos-Pollard =

Trinidad and Tobago politician

Member of Parliament for Arima
- In office 15 December 1986 – 16 December 1991
- Preceded by: Ashton Ford
- Succeeded by: Rupert Griffith

Personal details
- Party: National Alliance for Reconstruction

Gloria Thomasos-Pollard (died January 2000) was a Trinidad and Tobago politician from the National Alliance for Reconstruction.

== Career ==
She was elected in the 1986 Trinidad and Tobago general election for the constituency of Arima. She was the first non-People's National Movement candidate to win the seat.

== Personal life ==
Her father Arnold Thomasos was the Speaker of the House of Representatives for 20 years.

== See also ==
- List of Trinidad and Tobago Members of Parliament
