= J'ouvert =

Pre-Carnival festivities

- Type: National
- Celebrations: Carnivals
- Date: Varies among Caribbean islands
- Duration: 2 days
- Frequency: Annual

J'ouvert (/dʒuːˈveɪ/ joo-VAY) (also Jour ouvert, Jouvay, or Jouvé) is a traditional Carnival celebration in many countries throughout the Caribbean. The parade is believed to have its foundation in Trinidad and Tobago, with roots steeped in French Afro-Creole traditions such as Canboulay. J'ouvert typically begins in the early morning, before dawn, and peaks by mid-morning.

The celebration involves calypso or soca bands, DJs, and their followers dancing through the streets. In many countries, revelers cover their bodies in paint, mud, or pitch oil. Today J'ouvert is also a part of Carnival celebrations outside of the Caribbean, with the biggest celebrations happening in cities with large Caribbean ex-pat communities.

== Etymology ==
J'ouvert is a gallicization of jou ouvè (IPA [ʒu uvɛ]; jour ouvert in standard French), the French Creole term meaning "dawn" or "daybreak", as this is the time at which the celebration is typically held.

== History ==
The origins of J'ouvert can be traced back to Trinidad. French traditions from the island's original Carnival, African and Afro-Trinidadian traditions from Canboulay, and various social and political influences maybe have all played a role in shaping J'ouvert.

=== Trinidad's Carnival ===
J'ouvert is rooted in the history of Carnival in Trinidad. The French brought Carnival to Trinidad in the 1780s, a time of slavery. Their pre-lenten Carnival included hunting parties, dinners, balls, and masquerading. Enslaved Africans, who were banned from participating in Carnival, are said to have staged their own mini-carnivals, using their own rituals and folklore and imitating or mocking their masters' masquerade balls. These imitation carnivals and mocking of the ruling class likely gave rise to J'ouvert traditions, as parodying of the upper class is an important aspect of J'ouvert tradition.

Alternatively, J'ouvert masquerading traditions may come from directly a French Carnival tradition that took the form of "after-dinner raids on private homes". Friendly raiders would disguise themselves in humorous costumes that were often topical, parodying political or social events, and would remain disguised until their identities were guessed correctly. Costumes with political and social commentary are still seen in J'ouvert today.

=== Canboulay ===
Before Emancipation, enslaved Africans in Trinidad had celebrated Canboulay, a night-time harvest festival characterised by drums, singing, calinda dancing, chanting, and stick-fighting. The term "Canboulay" comes from the French cannes broullee, meaning "burnt cane". It may refer to the putting out of cane fires, the pre-harvest cane burning for pest control, or the burning of cane as an act of sabotage during the time of slavery.

Slavery was abolished in Trinidad and other British territories in 1833, with Emancipation taking effect 1 August 1834. After Emancipation, Canboulay developed into a festival for freed slaves and former indentured laborers to celebrate freedom. It was celebrated annually on Emancipation Day.

In 1881, the British colonial government on Trinidad attempted to ban Canboulay. This resulted in disturbances known as the Camboulay Riots, which took place in Port of Spain, San Fernando, and Princes Town. It is said that people smeared themselves with oil or paint to avoid being recognized, or may have been covered in black soot from burning cane. Today, covering bodies in oil, paint, or other substances is a distinctive tradition of J'ouvert. This tradition was likely carried forward in remembrance of the Canboulay Riots.

=== Peace Preservation Act ===
In 1884, the colonial government passed the Peace Preservation Act, which prohibited public carrying of torches, drumming, blowing horns, and stick-fighting (or the assembly of ten or more people with sticks). Many J'ouvert traditions may come from reactions to the prohibitions of the Peace Preservation Act. For instance, tamboo bamboo was introduced in the late 1880s as substitute for the drums and sticks. Tamboo bamboo bands developed and became the primary percussion instrument of Carnival.

Additional instruments were developed to replace the banned drums, and percussion was achieve through use of metal and other items as well. The history of J'ouvert's improvised instruments is celebrated today with the use of whistles, cowbells, bottles, and home-made instruments.

The Peace Preservation Act also established the official start of Carnival as 6:00 A.M. This likely explains the early-morning start time of J'ouvert. Canboulay had traditionally been a nighttime celebration, but after the Peace Preservation Act effectively banned Canboulay, Afro-Trinidadians began celebrating a reinterpretation of Canboulay beginning at 6:00 A.M. on Carnival Monday. Some historians claim that revelers took advantage of the pre-dawn darkness and began festivities before 6:00 A.M.—and that this secret and rebellious celebration is the origin of J'ouvert. Today, J'ouvert in the Caribbean typically begins before dawn.

=== Other origins ===
The pre-dawn tradition of J'ouvert may have roots in Caribbean folklore. For instance, there is a local Trinidadian legend about a soucouyant, who sheds her skin at night and consumes the blood of her victims. She must reenter her skin before dawn, but is unable to do so if someone sprinkles salt on her skin. According to legend, she will cry out "Jouvay, jou paka ouvay?" ("Daybreak, are you coming?) as dawn approaches.

== J'ouvert today ==
=== J'ouvert in the Caribbean ===
J'ouvert traditionally begins between 2:00 and 4:00 a.m. and continues until mid-morning. In The Bahamas, however, J'ouvert Bahamas begins at night and goes until the early hours of the morning. In some West Indian countries, J'ouvert is celebrated on Emancipation Day (the first day of August). In Trinidad, J'ouvert takes place on Carnival Monday, which in Trinidad is the Monday morning before Ash Wednesday. In Jamaica, there are several types of J'ouvert events which take place during the carnival season, as well as, in November and the summer.

Jamaica Carnival is usually held a week after Easter. J'ouvert celebrations are held leading up to the Sunday Road March. Jamaican J'ouvert typically starts at night until sunrise. Some events like Beach J'ouvert(s) are held in the afternoon until night and other events are held in the evening until midnight. Other islands celebrate J'ouvert on Carnival Monday as well, the date of which depends on their island's Carnival dates.

Participants follow and dance behind trucks or tractor-trailers, which play music from speakers or have live music. In Trinidad, Grenada, and Antigua, a part of the tradition involves covering the body in oil, mud, or chocolate. On other islands, coloured paints and powders are more popular for covering the clothes or body. Throughout the Caribbean, many J'ouvert revelers wear traditional, satirical, or popular costumes.

In Trinidad and Grenada, "Jab Jabs" (from the French diable, meaning "devil") dress as devils of different colors, and "Jab Molassi" (molasses devil) cover their bodies in oil from head to toe. By contrast, in Aruba J'ouvert is referred to as the "pajama party parade," as people can join wearing comfortable, regular clothes rather than dressing up in costume.

In many West Indian countries, J'ouvert is observed before the daytime Carnival Mas or "Pretty Mas". Pretty Mas is the Carnival parade featuring colorful costumes which are often made of feathers, beads, gem stones, brightly coloured fabrics, glitter and other elaborate body adornments and is more popular while commercially publicized. J'ouvert uses the rebellious nature of powder, mud and oil, while Pretty Mas celebrates the abstract allure of glitter, colour and light. J'ouvert is often contrasted with Pretty Mas, in that J'ouvert is said to be for "the people" while Pretty Mas is intended for the establishment.

=== J'ouvert in Brooklyn ===
Brooklyn is home to the largest West Indian population outside the Caribbean, and began its own Carnival celebration in the late 1960s. Organized by the West Indian American Day Carnival Association (WIADCA), the West Indian Day Parade is held annually on Labor Day Monday. The event attracts millions of participants who parade down central Brooklyn's Eastern Parkway. An early morning J'ouvert component was added to the celebration in the 1990s when steel pan player Earl King and community organizer Yvette Rennie formed J'ouvert City International. Featuring traditional steelbands (DJs and sound systems prohibited) and ole mas costumes, the Brooklyn J'ouvert attracts tens of thousands Carnival enthusiasts.

=== J'ouvert in London ===
J'ouvert marks the start of London's Notting Hill Carnival, one of the biggest street festivals in the world. The J'ouvert event typically starts at 6:00 a.m. and takes place in the streets of Notting Hill. Revelers cover themselves in colored powder, oil, or paint, and others dress in elaborate costumes. The celebration involves multiple hours of music and dancing.

=== J'ouvert in Toronto ===
The Toronto Caribbean Carnival is held each summer in Toronto, Ontario, and features a pre-dawn J'ouvert celebration. Unlike J'ouvert of the Caribbean, Toronto's J'ouvert often takes place at an outdoor venue rather than in the streets as a parade. The celebration usually features steelpan bands, other live music, DJs, as well as revelers using improvised musical instruments, whistles, and other music makers. Participants will occasionally cover themselves with mud, flour, baby powder, or paint. Some participants dress to resemble evil spirits, such as devils of different colors, including the "Jab Jab".

== See also ==
- Trinidad Carnival
- List of Caribbean Carnivals around the world
- Lists of festivals in North America
