= 2023 Trinidad and Tobago presidential election =

- 20 January 2023
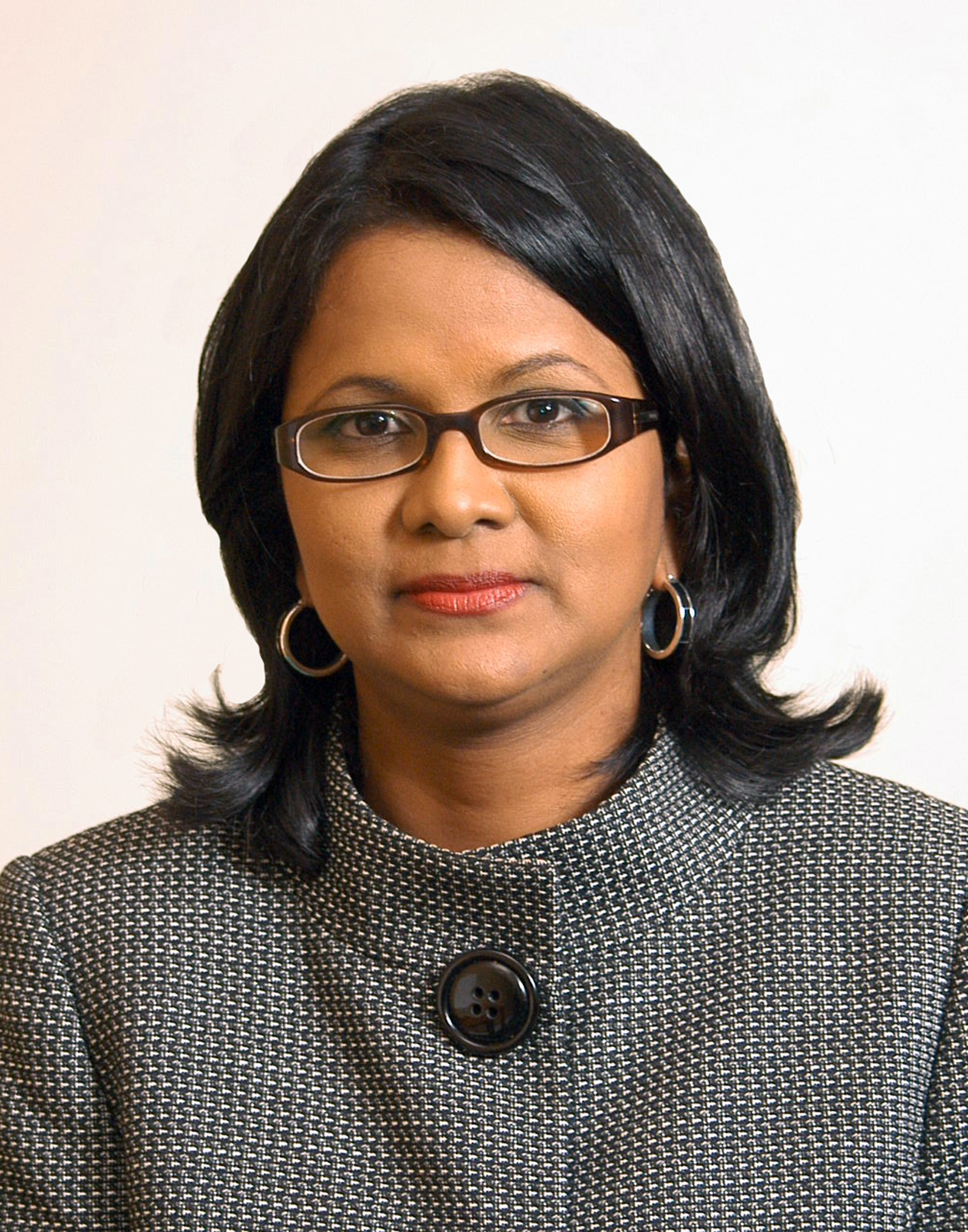
Nominee	Christine Kangaloo	Israel Raja-Khan
Party	Independent	Independent
Electoral vote	48	22
Nominators	PNM	UNC
President before election
Paula-Mae Weekes
Independent
Elected President
Christine Kangaloo
Independent

Indirect presidential elections were held in Trinidad and Tobago on 20 January 2023.

== Context ==
On 5 January 2018, the name of Paula-Mae Weekes, a judge of the Turks and Caicos Islands Court of Appeal, was put forward by the PNM government of Prime Minister Keith Rowley in hopes of reaching a consensus with the UNC-led parliamentary opposition of Kamla Persad-Bissessar, which later indeed endorsed her nomination as well. As Weekes was the only nominated candidate on election day, she was deemed elected without the need for a vote. Paula-Mae Weeks thus became the first woman to take office as president of Trinidad and Tobago on 19 March 2018.

The PNM government nominated Christine Kangaloo, the President of the Senate. The opposition UNC declined to endorse her candidacy on the grounds that she was an active member of the government party and so have nominated their own candidate, Israel Raja-Khan. It was the first time in more than two decades that a presidential election took place without a consensus candidate.

== Electoral method ==
The President of Trinidad and Tobago is indirectly elected for a 5-year term by an electoral college comprising all 41 members of the House of Representatives and all 31 members of the Senate, plus the speakers of both chambers.

To win the election a candidate must gain a plurality of votes cast, whereby a quorum comprising the Speaker of the House of Representatives, 10 Senators and 12 other member of the House of Representatives must be met for the election to be considered valid. If only one candidate should be nominated to run in the election, he or she shall be considered to have been elected president without the need for a vote to take place.

== Candidates ==
=== Nominated by the Government ===
- Christine Kangaloo, President of the Senate (2015–2023)

=== Nominated by the Opposition ===
- Israel Raja-Khan, Senior Counsel

== Results ==
Candidate	Party	Votes	%
Christine Kangaloo	Independent	48	68.57
Israel Raja-Khan	Independent	22	31.43
Total		70	100.00
Valid votes		70	95.89
Invalid/blank votes		3	4.11
Total votes		73	100.00
Registered voters/turnout		74	98.65
