= List of post-nominal letters (Trinidad and Tobago) =

Post-nominal letters in Trinidad and Tobago include:

Office	Post-nominal
Honours System
Order of the Republic of Trinidad and Tobago	ORTT
Trinity Cross (replaced by ORTT in 2008)	TC
Chaconia Medal	CM (Note: Although issued in three classes (Gold, Silver and Bronze) all three medals carry the same post-nominal letters.)
Hummingbird Medal	HBM
Public Service Medal of Merit	MOM

== See also ==
- Lists of post-nominal letters
