= Philmore Davidson =

Philmore Gordon "Boots" Davidson (1928 in Port-of-Spain, Trinidad – 1993) was an arranger and musician of the steelpan.

== Person ==
Philmore Davidson was one of the leading figures of the Casablanca Steel Orchestra, one of the oldest steel bands of Trinidad. He was a member of the Trinidad All Steel Percussion Orchestra (TASPO) and visited England in 1951. In 1956, Davidson left Trinidad to live in London.
