= Alexander's Ragtime Band (disambiguation) =

Alexander's Ragtime Band is a 1911 composition by American songwriter Irving Berlin. It may also refer to:

- Alexander's Ragtime Band (film), a 1938 film by American director Henry King
- Alexander's Ragtime Band (band), a ragtime band in Trinidad and Tobago
