= Alexander's Ragtime Band (band) =

20th Century steel percussion band

Alexander's Ragtime Band was one of the first all-steel percussion bands in Trinidad and Tobago and is considered a forerunner of the steelband. The band was organised at the Big Yard in Newtown in western Port of Spain, and first emerged on Carnival Monday morning in 1939. Named for the film Alexander's Ragtime Band, the band was louder and more mobile than tamboo bamboo bands that were popular at the time, and represented a change in musicality. They inspired the rapid adoption of steel percussion by bands in Port of Spain, leading to the development of the steelpan.

== History ==
Alexander's Ragtime Band formed from the Newtown tamboo bamboo band which was based at the Big Yard at the corner of Woodford Street and Tragarete Road in Newtown, in western Port of Spain. The Newtown tamboo bamboo band had been formed by former members of the Calvary tamboo bamboo band, which had played at the Calvary Calypso Tent located on Woodford Street. In the late 1920s or early 1930s their calypso tent was evicted by its landlord and relocated to Picton Street, but several members shifted to lower Woodford Street, where they established a stick fighting "gayelle", or arena, and formed a new tamboo bamboo band.

According to historian Kim Johnson, Alexander's Ragtime Band first emerged as part of the festivities on J'ouvert morning, 20 February 1939, from the Big Yard. Different accounts exist of when their first J'ouvert appearance took place, and Johnson notes the lack of any contemporary documentary evidence beyond a mention of "Eric Stowe's Bad Behaviour Rag Time Band, which was reported by to be the winner of the "Best Bamboo Band" in a 1939 Carnival Monday competition on Besson Street in Port of Spain by the Port of Spain Gazette. (Note: Johnson believes that this is a conflation between this band and another carnival band, the S.S. Bad Behaviour, which came out of Hell Yard in eastern Port of Spain and was led by Eric Stowe at the time.)

The band was named after the film Alexander's Ragtime Band, which was released in Trinidad in 24 November 1938, and was mentioned by the Roaring Lion in a 1940 calypso. Since Lion's calypso would have been written before Carnival, Johnson felt confident that the band's first appearance was for J'ouvert in 1939.

== Impact ==
Although steel percussion had been used in tamboo bamboo bands before 1939, and an all-steel band (later known as the Gonzalez Rhythm Makers) had come out of Gonzalez in eastern Port of Spain in 1937, Alexander's Ragtime Band was the first to have more than one tone in their instruments. They were also different in their organisation and orchestration, and were much more mobile than any tamboo bamboo band.

Alexander's Ragtime Band inspired other tamboo bamboo bands to discard bamboo in favour of steel instruments, which drove the rapid development of the steelpan and the steelbands.
