= PanoGrama =

Televised music competition

- Genre: Music competition
- Created by: Nevin Roach
- Judges: Liam Teague, Victor Provost, Mia Gormandy-Benjamin, Ojay Richards, Andy Chichester, David 'ZigE' Walcott
- Theme music composer: Mark Forde
- Countries of origin: Trinidad and Tobago

Production
- Executive producer: Nevin Roach
- Editors: Leeandro Noray, Rivelino Simmons
- Production company: PanoGrama Entertainment

Original release
- Release: April 24, 2020

PanoGrama is a steelpan competition for soloists, created by Nevin Roach. The program broadcasts on CBC TV8 and other networks. It premiered on April 24, 2020, during the height of COVID-19 restrictions and lockdowns, to provide entertainment.

The program attracts a variety of participants from across the Caribbean, the United States, Canada and Europe. The performances consist of a wide variety of musical genres – reggae, soca, calypso, gospel, jazz and others. Each participant attempts to progress to the finals and win the title, by impressing a panel of judges. The current line-up consists of Liam Teague, Victor Provost, Mia Gormandy-Benjamin, Ojay Richards and Andy Chichester. The winner receives a cash prize, and since the second season, a chance to headline a show Canada.

Since May 2020 the program has run for a total of three seasons.The third season of the series premiered in May 2022 and featured five countries in the final. It has helped young pannists to take major steps in their music careers.

== History ==
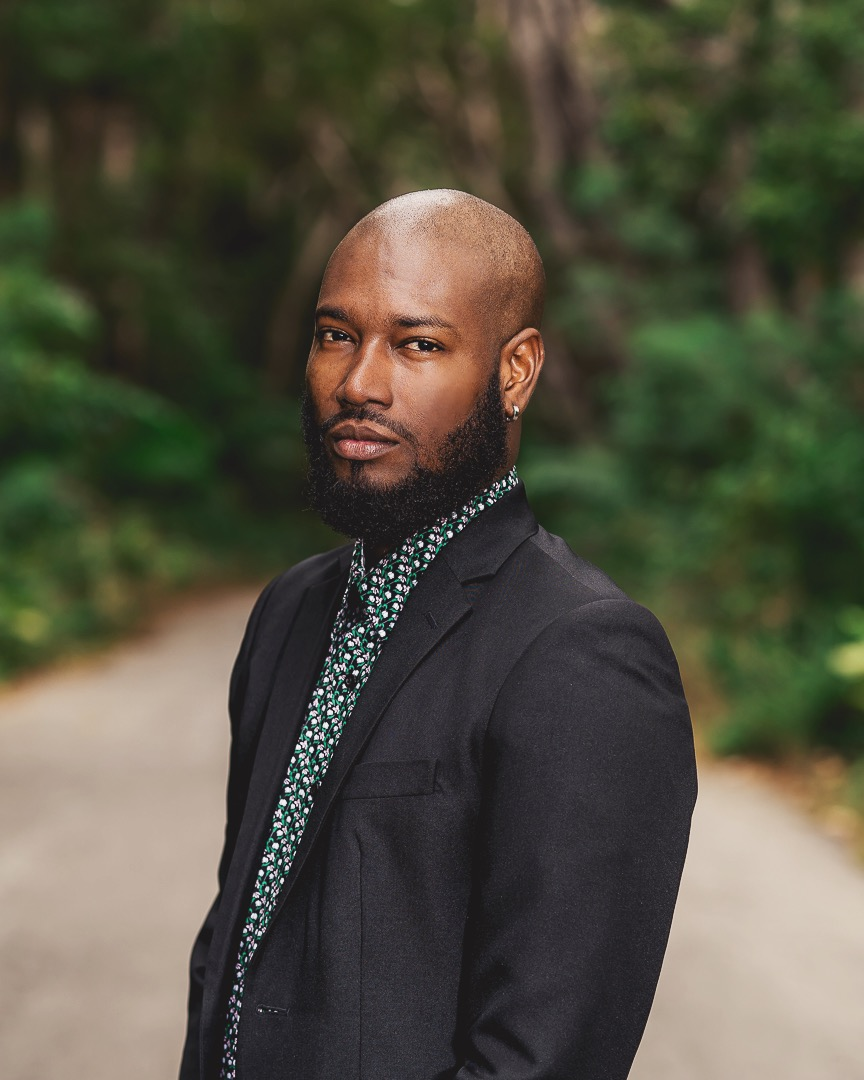
Nevin Roach, creator of PanoGrama

The concept of PanoGrama was devised by Tobagonian Nevin Roach, who sought to create a steelpan competition that caters to the development of youth, to help steelpannists in need, and to entertain the international steelpan community. In 2020, during the COVID-19 pandemic, Roach had a lightbulb moment when he saw other creatives streaming live entertainment on social media. It made history as the first online steelpan competition. The name PanoGrama is a combination of Panorama and Instagram since the very first season was broadcast exclusively on Instagram, before the competition expanded to television. Earl Brooks Jr. won the inaugural competition.

The competition took a break in 2023 to restructure.

== Format ==
Each year's competition begins with virtual auditions, where aspiring participants submit a performance video to be reviewed by a panel. Once the participants make it past the audition stage, they compete in the preliminary round. Qualified judges determine which participants make it to the semifinals and finals. The number of participants is cut from round to round. Participants must also participate in development workshops aimed at providing tools for a successful career.

== Season synopses ==
Season	Originally Aired		Winner	Runner(s)-up	Third place
Season	First Aired	Last Aired	Winner	Runner(s)-up	Third place
1	April 24, 2020	May 3, 2020	Earl Brooks Jr. (T&T)	Dejean Cain (T&T)	Kersh Ramsey (T&T)
2	May 7, 2021	May 22, 2021	Keishaun Julien (T&T)	Dejean Cain (T&T)	Tyeesha Alexander (T&T)
3	May 6, 2022	June 12, 2022	Mathieu Borgne (France)	Hanif Goodridge (T&T)	Shaquille Forbes (T&T)

=== Season 1 (2020) ===
The first season for PanoGrama was promoted and aired in April 2020. Participants were accepted on a registration basis and were allowed to compete without screening. All episodes aired live on Instagram. The first season was hosted by Nevin Roach, with the judging panel consisting of Ojay Richards, David Walcott and Kenneth Joseph. The first season was won by Earl Brooks Jr. (T&T), followed by Dejean Cain (T&T) in 2nd and Kersh Ramsey (T&T) in 3rd. Mikey Mercer, Nandi Yard, Hance John and Jadon Philip were guest performers. The winner received cash.

=== Season 2 (2021) ===
Following the success of the previous season, PanoGrama received more final injections for the project and got its first title sponsor. It was renamed the NLCB PanoGrama. The second season aired between May 7 and 22, 2021 and the broadcast was expanded to YouTube, Facebook and Television. Auditions were introduced to screen participants and the judging panel was increased from 3 to 5. Liam Teague, Victor Provost and Andy Chichester were added to the previous panel, while Kenneth Joseph was removed. Aundrea Wharton was added as co-host to support Nevin Roach.

The 'Knowledge for Success Series' was added to the programme to better help with the development of participants and was delivered by Liam Teague, Steffon Campbell and Natasha Joseph.

The second season was won by Keishaun Julien (T&T), followed by Dejean Cain (T&T) in 2nd and Tyeesha Alexander (T&T) in 3rd. The winner received cash, a brand-new instrument, and the opportunity to headline a show in Canada. Kylie Fisher and Ricardo Seales were guest performers.

=== Season 3 (2022) ===
The third season saw the introduction of the first female judge. Mia Gormandy-Benjamin was appointed to the panel, which was reduced to 3 judges as in the first season. Liam Teague and Victor Provost remained on the main panel, while Andy Chichester and Ojay Richards were substitutes. PanoGrama got its first international television deal to be broadcast in 19 countries.

For the first time, a steelpannist not from Trinidad and Tobago won the competition. Mathieu Borgne (France) placed first, followed by Hanif Goodridge (T&T) in 2nd and Shaquille Forbes (T&T) in 3rd. Neptunes Riddim Section guest performed.

== Countries and participants ==
Country	Year		
Country	2020	2021	2022
Antigua & Barbuda	Amarni Gomes	Kevhani Greenaway, Japhon Barthley, Maurisha Potter, Samanya Brazier, Demetre Samuel	Maurisha Potter, Malik Smith
Barbados	Mark Forde, Dwayne Jones, Hashim Durant	Andre Forde	–
Belize	–	–	Alex Alexander
Canada	–	Gabriel Chartrand	Gabriel Chartrand, Thadel Wilson
England	–	Douglas Dallaway	–
France	–	Mathieu Borgne	Mathiue Borgne, Olivier Wiren
Grenada	–	Mikiel Smith	Mikiel Smith
Guyana	Darius Austin	Detroy Dey	–
Jamaica	Ravon Rhoden	–	–
Puerto Rico	Jose Rosa Santos	–	–
St. Kitts & Nevis	–	–	Aaron Mentos
St. Lucia	–	Al Alexander	Al Alexander
St. Maarten	Isidore York	–	–
T&T	Dejean Cain, Earl Brooks Jr., Tyeesha Alexander, Keishaun Julien, Kern Sumerville, Kersh Ramsey, Jamel Cadette, Leeandro Noray, Ionaire Joseph, Kwesi Paul, Marcel Antoine	Vivian Williams, Shovon Brown, Aquila Pereira, Keishaun Julien, Megan-Leigh Langton-Attang, Kion Robinson, Charlton Alfonso, Hanif Goodridge, Jamel Cadette, Deja Cain, Tyeesha Alexander, Dejean Cain, Carlon Lyons, Shaquille Forbes, Earl Brooks Jr.	Sachelle Thomas, Devon Atherley, Simeon Superville, Marcus Prince, Emmanuel Joseph, Jamel Cadette, Deja Cain, Aquila Pereira, Jaron Woodsley, Christopher Neale, Tevin Shockness, Hanif Goodridge, Shaquille Forbes
US	Ryan Joseph	Matthew Kiser, David Yundi	David Yundi
US Virgin Is.	–	Le'roi Simmonds	–

== Reception ==
- "I have witnessed the competition in the past, and know that PanoGrama attracts a high quality of pannists from various countries around the world" – Loop News
- "It was a very fulfilling and learning experience. The reception was warm and professional, and I felt like part of a team where my ideas were valued". – Antigua Observer
- "It is a great initiative to keep going. It helps with the development and the sharpening of skills so that people cannot only compete, but they can also go out into the world and represent on a higher level" – Trinidad & Tobago Guardian
- "The virtual competition has encouraged network building, investing, knowledge and elevation"- Trinidad & Tobago Newsday

== Youth development ==
Industry professionals are recruited to help groom participants in various areas such as personal and professional development. PanoGrama also has a professional relationship with the Caribbean School of Media and Communication at the University of the West Indies, Mona, to provide internships for students. PanoGrama collaborated with the Inter-American Development Bank and the Ministry of Youth Sports and Culture – Bahamas in 2022, to educate, influence and motivate persons through workshops.
