= Jagdeo Singh =

Trinidadian attorney and politician (born 1966)

The Honourable Jagdeo Singh MP
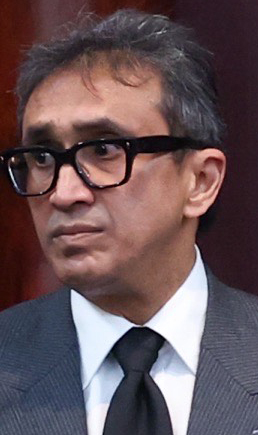
- Singh in 2025

10th Speaker of the House of Representatives
- Incumbent
- Assumed office 23 May 2025
- President: Christine Kangaloo
- Prime Minister: Kamla Persad-Bissessar
- Preceded by: Bridgid Annisette-George

Member of the Law Reform Commission of Trinidad and Tobago
- In office 2011–2017
- President: George Maxwell Richards; Anthony Carmona
- Prime Minister: Kamla Persad-Bissessar; Keith Rowley

Personal details
- Born: 20 January 1966 (age 60)

Jagdeo Singh MP (born 20 January 1966) is a Trinidadian attorney and politician who has been the 10th Speaker of the House of Representatives since 2025. Prior to his tenure as speaker he was a lawyer and was convicted of corruption in 2001, but it was overturned by the Privy Council in 2005.

== Early life and education ==
Jagdeo Singh was born on 20 January 1966. He was admitted to the bar in 1989.

== Career ==
Singh was retained as a lawyer by a woman for her partner, who was facing drug-related charges. Singh allegedly accepted to represent him for an additional $50,000; Singh stated that he did accept $10,000, but not any other payments. It was claimed that Singh tried to solicit a $40,000 bribe meant for the magistrate and prosecutor in order to secure bail for the woman's partner. In 2001, he was convicted on two charges under the Prevention of Corruption Act and sentenced to seven years of hard labour. He appealed his sentence, but it was maintained on 15 November 2002. The Privy Council allowed him to challenge the conduct on his trial on 2 October 2003, and overturned his conviction in 2005 on the grounds that the judge failed to properly instruct the jury. The Privy Council ruled that a retrial was inappropriate due to him already serving part of his sentence.

Singh was a member of commission that investigated the Jamaat al Muslimeen coup attempt. He was on the Law Reform Commission from 2011 to 2017.

Barry Padarath nominated Singh to be Speaker and he was elected without opposition on 23 May 2025. He called for the creation of a parliamentary code of conduct in 2025.

== Works cited ==
=== News ===
- "Speaker: Privy Council cleared me of corruption charges". Trinidad and Tobago Newsday. 24 May 2025. Archived from the original on 27 May 2025.
- Felmine, Kevon (25 June 2025). "Speaker wants Parliamentarians to establish a code of conduct". Trinidad and Tobago Guardian. Archived from the original on 1 July 2025.
- Khan, Rishard (24 May 2025). "Wade Mark, Jagdeo Singh elected Senate president, Speaker". Trinidad and Tobago Newsday. Archived from the original on 24 May 2025.

=== Web ===
- "The Honourable Jagdeo Singh". Parliament of Trinidad and Tobago. Archived from the original on 1 July 2025.
- "Trinidad and Tobago". Inter-Parliamentary Union. Archived from the original on 1 July 2025.
