= Sinanan =

Sinanan is a surname. Notable people with the surname include:

- Ashford Sinanan (1923–1994), Trinidad and Tobago politician
- Barendra Sinanan (1948-), Trinidad and Tobago politician
- Rohan Sinanan, Trinidad and Tobago politician

== See also ==
- Sinhasan
