= Marilyn Gordon =

Politician from Trinidad and Tobago

Member of the House of Representatives for Arouca
- In office 1981–1986

Personal details
- Party: People's National Movement

Marilyn Gordon is a Trinidad and Tobago politician from the People's National Movement. She has been an athlete, educator, and government minister. She has sat in the House of Representatives and the Senate.

== Career ==
Gordon represented Trinidad and Tobago in athletics and hockey winning silver in the javelin event at the 1960 West Indies Championships. In 1978, she was appointed a minister in the Ministry of Finance. She also served as minister of Sport Culture and Youth Affairs.

In 2022, she received the Order of the Republic of Trinidad and Tobago, the Humming Bird Medal Silver for duties to sport, education and politics. In 2024, she received an Honorary Doctorate from the University of Trinidad and Tobago.

== See also ==
- List of Trinidad and Tobago MPs
