= List of Caribbean aerophones =

List of aerophones used in Caribbean music, including the islands of the Caribbean Sea, Guyana, Suriname, French Guiana, Belize, and Bermuda.

Instrument	Tradition	Hornbostel–Sachs classification	Description
accordion	Dominican Republic	4	Used in popular merengue, where it replaced the guitar.
accordion	Belize	3	Used in Belizean Brukdown.
bois bourrique	See vaccine	-	
botija botijuela, bunga	Cuba	4	Empty jug, sometimes with a hole on the side, used in rural folk genres like son
botijuela	See botija	-	
bugle	Trinidad and Tobago	4	Original source of the melody in steelpan
bunga	See botija	-	
cayambouque	Haiti	4	Cow horn, used for signalling
clarinet	Trinidad and Tobago	4	Used in traditional calypso
clarinet	Trinidad and Tobago	4	Later addition to the tamboo bamboo ensembles
conchshell {{{Other names}}}	Garifuna music	423.110	Conch shell horn, used for signalling, traditional drumming.
cornet	Trinidad and Tobago	4	Used in traditional calypso
flute	Dominican Republic	4	Used to accompany upper-class merengue in the later 19th century
harmonium	Indo-Caribbean	4	Used in chutney music
kartal	Trinidad and Tobago	4	Harmonium, used in chutney
lambis	Haiti	423.11	Conch shell horn, used for signalling
saxophone	Garifuna music	4	Used in Garifuna Punta
saxophone	Dominican Republic, Cuba,	4	Used in merengue, where it is the main instrumentation for the jaleo. Used in popular Cuban bands.
trumpet	Cuba	4	Used in comparsa pre-Easter celebrations
trumpet	Trinidad and Tobago	4	Later addition to the tamboo bamboo ensembles
trumpet	Trinidad and Tobago	4	Used in the Spiritual Baptist musical tradition
vaccine bois borrique	Haiti	423	Made of bamboo
von-von	Haiti	412.22	Bullroarer, used in Rara ceremonies
