= Wade Mark =

Politician from Trinidad and Tobago

The Honourable Wade Mark
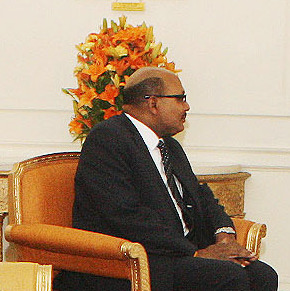
- Mark in 2012

12th President of the Senate of Trinidad and Tobago
- Incumbent
- Assumed office 23 May 2025
- President: Christine Kangaloo
- Prime Minister: Kamla Persad-Bissessar
- Preceded by: Nigel de Freitas

11th Speaker of the House of Representatives of Trinidad and Tobago
- In office 18 June 2010 – 23 September 2015
- President: George Maxwell Richards
- Prime Minister: Kamla Persad-Bissessar
- Preceded by: Barendra Sinanan
- Succeeded by: Bridgid Annisette-George

Personal details
- Born: 20 October 1953 (age 72) Ottawa, Trinidad and Tobago
- Party: United National Congress
- Other political affiliations: People's Partnership (2010-2015); Communist Party of Trinidad and Tobago (1980s)
- Spouse: Sushilla Ramkissoon
- Children: 4
- Education: University of the West Indies (BA)
- Profession: Politician

Wade Mark (born 18 November 1953) is a Trinidadian and Tobagonian politician that is currently serving as the 12th president of the Senate of Trinidad and Tobago since 2025. He served as the Speaker of the House from 2010 to 2015 and obtained his bachelor's degree in politics and economics from the University of the West Indies, Saint Augustine campus in 1979.

== Career ==
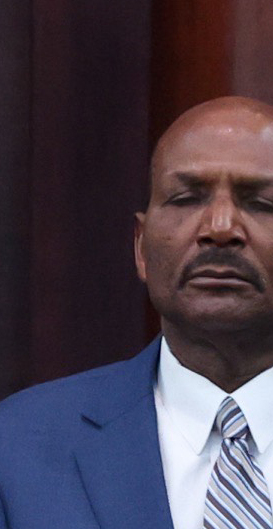
Wade Mark in 2025

In the early 1980s, Wade Mark served as Education and Research Officer for the Bank and General Workers’ Union, where he developed worker-education initiatives and edited the union’s publication, Labour Insight. During this period, he expressed interest in Marxist ideology and reportedly attempted to join the Communist Party of Trinidad and Tobago, a small leftist party active in the 1980s. Although he was never formally a member, this affiliation attracted criticism later in his political career.

Mark entered mainstream politics as a founding member of the United National Congress. He was appointed as a Senator in 1990 and has served in the Parliament of Trinidad and Tobago for over three decades. He has held several ministerial and parliamentary leadership roles, including Minister of Public Administration and Information during the 5th Republic Parliament, Vice-President of the Senate during the 6th Parliament, and Chair of various joint select committees.

He was elected Speaker of the House of Representatives on 18 June 2010, serving until 2015. During his tenure, Mark was noted for his strict enforcement of parliamentary rules. He also participated in international parliamentary organizations, such as the Commonwealth Parliamentary Association and the Inter-Parliamentary Union.

In May 2025, Mark was elected President of the Senate, further cementing his role as one of the most senior figures in the national legislature.

== Personal life ==
Wade Mark has kept his personal life private, rarely speaking publicly about family matters. He is recognized for his disciplined approach to public service and for his long-standing advocacy for workers' rights and transparency in governance. Mark is also a patron of the Marabella Family Crisis Centre, reflecting his involvement in community outreach and social welfare programs.
