= Julius Hamilton Maurice =

Trinidad and Tobago politician (1899–1988)

President of the Senate of Trinidad and Tobago
- In office 29 December 1961 – 22 April 1971
- Preceded by: Position established
- Succeeded by: Wahid Ali

Personal details
- Born: 14 August 1899
- Died: 23 July 1988 (aged 88)
- Party: People's National Movement
- Education: University of London

Julius Hamilton Maurice was a Trinidad and Tobago politician and President of the Senate.

Maurice was born in the south of Trinidad on 14 August 1899. He worked as a teacher and established the Southern Grammar School. He worked at Naparima College and later as a lecturer at the Government Teachers' Training College. When he was working in Tobago, he received a scholarship in the University of London, Institute of Education. When he returned from London in 1947, he was hired as Director of Education in Dominica, where he worked until 1955. He later returned to Trinidad and Tobago.

In 1956 Maurice took part in the creation of People's National Movement. He was elected twice as President of the Senate from 29 December 1961 until 22 April 1971. In 1971 he was a member of the constitution commission led by Sir Hugh Wooding. He received Trinity Cross in 1972.

Maurice died on 23 July 1988.
