= Parliament of Trinidad and Tobago =

Legislature of Trinidad and Tobago

Coordinates: 10°39′11″N 61°30′42″W

Parliament of the Republic of Trinidad and Tobago
- 13th Republican Parliament
- Flag Coat of Arms

- Logo of the Parliament of Trinidad and Tobago

Type
- Type: Bicameral
- Houses: Senate; House of Representatives

History
- Founded: 31 August 1962 (63 years ago)
- Preceded by: Legislative Council of Trinidad and Tobago
- New session started: 28 August 2020

Leadership
- President: Christine Kangaloo, Independent (Note: Kangaloo was a previous member of the PNM) since 20 March 2023
- Prime Minister: Kamla Persad-Bissessar, UNC since 1 May 2025
- President of the Senate: Wade Mark (Note: Mark was elected President of the Senate under the nomination of the UNC. However, the position of Senate President is officially one without political affiliation.) since 23 May 2025
- Vice President of the Senate: Kenya Charles, UNC since 23 May 2025
- Speaker of the House of Representatives: Jagdeo Singh (Note: Jagdeo Singh was elected Speaker of the House of Representatives under the nomination of the UNC. However, the position of Speaker of the House of Representatives is officially one without political affiliation.) since 23 May 2025
- Deputy Speaker of the House of Representatives: Aiyna Ali, UNC since 23 May 2025
- Leader of the Opposition: Pennelope Beckles-Robinson, PNM since 6 May 2025
- Leader of Government Business in the House of Representatives: Barry Padarath, UNC since 23 May 2025
- Opposition Chief Whip in the House of Representatives: Marvin Gonzales, PNM since 23 May 2025
- Leader of Government Business in the Senate: Darrell Allahar, UNC since 23 May 2025

Structure
- Seats: 72; 31 Senators; 41 Members of Parliament (MPs)
- Senate political groups: Government: United National Congress–Coalition of Interests (16); Official Opposition: People's National Movement (6); Other: Independent (9)
- House of Representatives political groups: Government: United National Congress-Coalition of Interests (26); Official Opposition: People's National Movement (13); Other: Tobago People's Party (2)

Elections
- Senate voting system: Appointment by the president on advice of the prime minister (16), at her discretion (9) and opposition leader (6)
- House of Representatives voting system: First-past-the-post
- Last House of Representatives election: 28 April 2025
- Next House of Representatives election: 2030

Meeting place
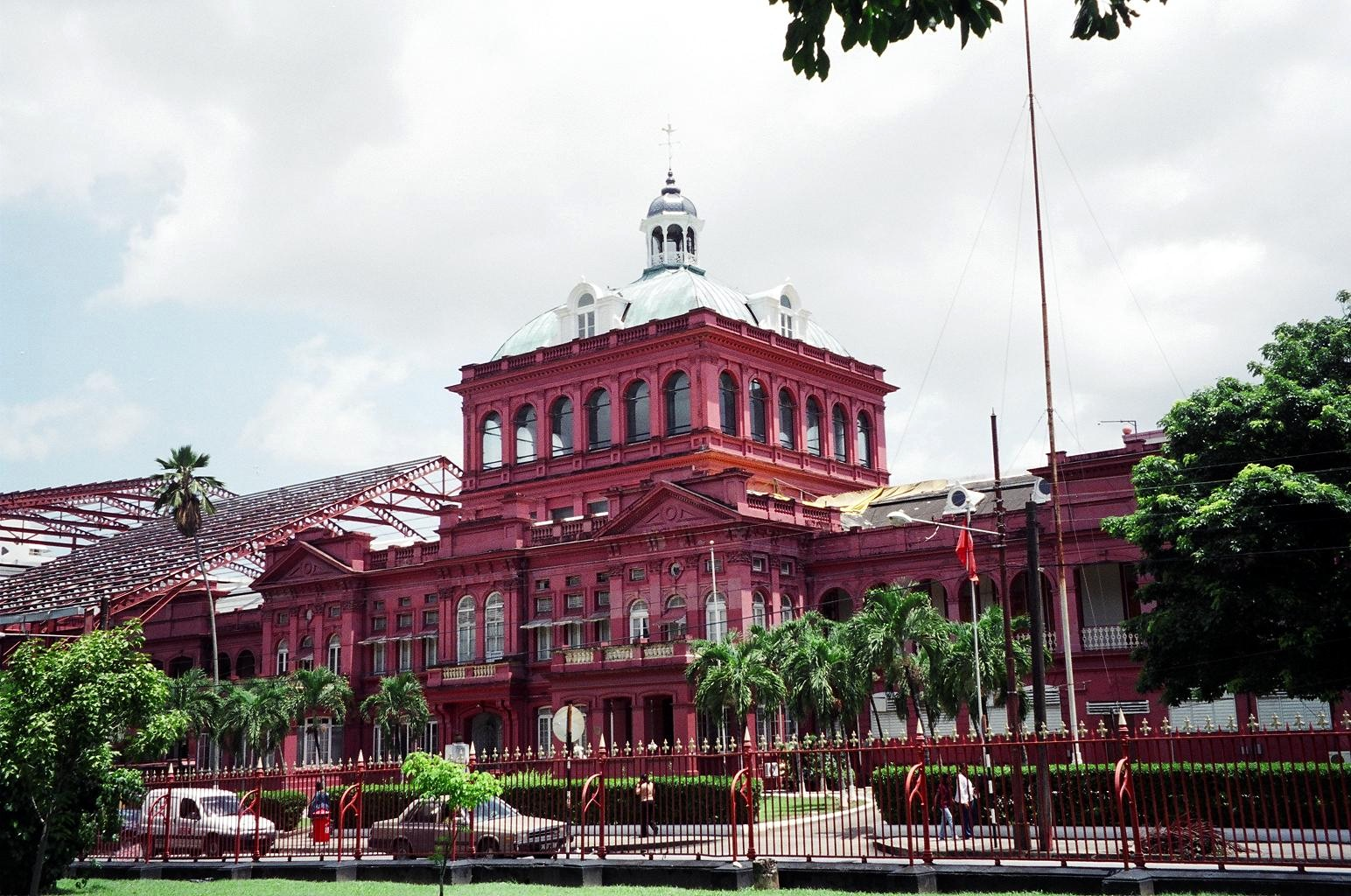
- The Red House, Abercromby Street, Downtown, Port of Spain, Trinidad and Tobago

Website
- www.ttparliament.org

Constitution
- Constitution of Trinidad and Tobago

The Parliament of Trinidad and Tobago is the legislative branch of Trinidad and Tobago. The Parliament is bicameral. Besides the President of Trinidad and Tobago, it is composed of the House of Representatives, which is composed of the Speaker of the House of Representatives in addition to 41 directly elected members serving a five-year term in single-seat constituencies, and the Senate which has 31 members appointed by the President: 16 Government Senators appointed on the advice of the Prime Minister, 6 Opposition Senators appointed on the advice of the Leader of the Opposition and 9 Independent Senators appointed by the President to represent other sectors of civil society. It is at present the only parliament in the world with an incumbent female President, President of the Senate, Speaker of the House of Representatives and Leader of the Opposition and made history by appointing the Caribbean's first and only transgender parliamentarian on 15 February 2022. As of 20 April 2021, there are only 24 female members, or 32.9% and eight members born in Tobago or 11.0%.

== International affiliation(s) ==
- ACP–EU Joint Parliamentary Assembly
- Canada-Caribbean Parliamentary Friendship Group
- Commonwealth Parliamentary Association
- Inter-Parliamentary Union IPU

== See also ==
- House of Representatives of Trinidad and Tobago
- Senate of Trinidad and Tobago
- Elections in Trinidad and Tobago
- List of political parties in Trinidad and Tobago
- Politics of Trinidad and Tobago
- List of parliaments of Trinidad and Tobago
- The Red House, Parliament building
