= Christine Kangaloo =

President of Trinidad and Tobago since 2023

Her Excellency Christine Kangaloo ORTT
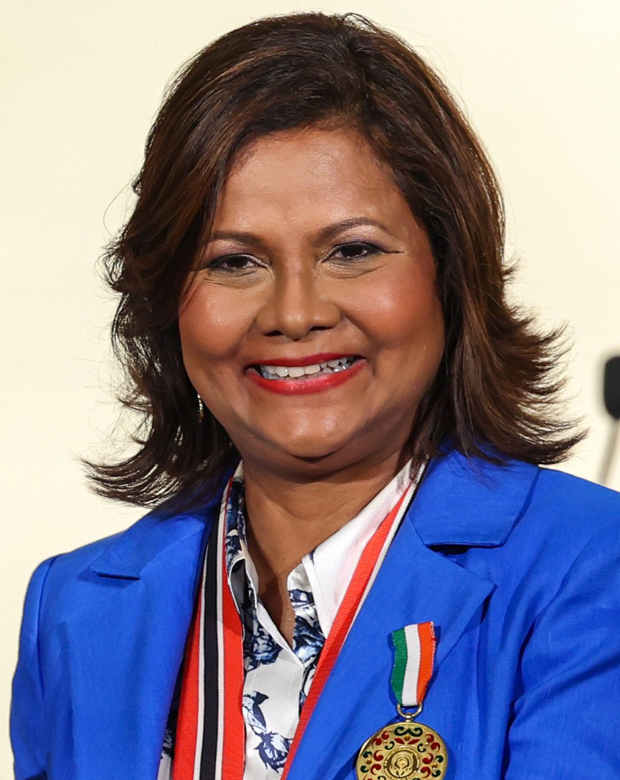
- Kangaloo in 2025

7th President of Trinidad and Tobago
- Incumbent
- Assumed office 20 March 2023
- Prime Minister: Keith Rowley; Stuart Young; Kamla Persad-Bissessar
- Preceded by: Paula-Mae Weekes

6th President of the Senate of Trinidad and Tobago
- In office 23 September 2015 – 17 January 2023
- President: Anthony Carmona; Paula-Mae Weekes
- Prime Minister: Keith Rowley
- Preceded by: Raziah Ahmed
- Succeeded by: Nigel de Freitas
Parliamentary offices
Member of the Senate
In office 23 September 2015 – 17 January 2023
| Prime Minister | Keith Rowley |
| Succeeded by | Richie Sookhai |
Member of Parliament for Pointe-à-Pierre
In office 5 November 2007 – 24 May 2010
| Prime Minister | Patrick Manning |
| Preceded by | Gillian Lucky |
| Succeeded by | Errol McLeod |
7th Vice-President of the Senate of Trinidad and Tobago
In office 5 April 2002 – 28 August 2002
| Prime Minister | Patrick Manning |
| Senate President | Linda Baboolal |
| Preceded by | Wade Mark |
| Succeeded by | Rawle Titus |
6th Opposition Senator
In office 12 January 2001 – 13 October 2001
Ministerial offices
8th Minister of Science, Technology and Tertiary Education
In office 8 November 2007 – 25 May 2010
| Preceded by | Mustapha Abdul-Hamid |
| Succeeded by | Fazal Karim |
8th Minister of Legal Affairs
In office 14 May 2005 – 7 November 2007
| Preceded by | Peter Taylor |
| Succeeded by | Prakash Ramadhar |
6th Minister in the Office of the Prime Minister (Social Services Delivery)
In office 15 October 2002 – 13 May 2005
| Preceded by | Position established |
| Succeeded by | Position abolished |

Personal details
- Born: 1 December 1961 (age 64) San Fernando, Trinidad and Tobago
- Party: Independent (since 2025) (Note: Kangaloo was elected senate president and president under the nomination of the PNM. She resigned her party membership prior to taking office.)
- Other political affiliations: People's National Movement (2001–2015)
- Spouse: Kerwyn Garcia (m. 1998)
- Education: University of the West Indies (LL.B.); Hugh Wooding Law School (LEC)
- Profession: Politician; lawyer
- Awards: Order of the Republic of Trinidad and Tobago (2023); Pravasi Bharatiya Samman (2025)

Christine Carla Kangaloo ORTT (born 1 December 1961) is a Trinidadian lawyer and politician who is serving as the President of Trinidad and Tobago since 2023. Upon succeeding Paula-Mae Weekes on 20 March 2023, she became the first woman in the Americas to succeed another woman as Head of State. Globally, she is the second woman to achieve this feat in a parliamentary republic, following Ireland's Mary McAleese, who succeeded Mary Robinson in 1997. Additionally, she is the first woman of Indian ancestry to serve as a president of a country in the Americas.

Prior to her presidency, Kangaloo had an extensive career in public service and the legal profession. She served as an Assistant Registrar of the Supreme Court (1992–1996) before entering Parliament as an Opposition Senator in 2001. She subsequently held multiple ministerial portfolios, including Minister of Legal Affairs (2005–2007) and Minister of Science, Technology and Tertiary Education (2007–2010), and served as the Member of Parliament for Pointe-à-Pierre.

== Biography ==
Christine Kangaloo was born into a Presbyterian Indo-Trinidadian family to Carlyle and Barbara Kangaloo and she is the fifth of their seven children. In 2018, she and her husband converted to Roman Catholicism. She graduated from the University of the West Indies and Hugh Wooding Law School and with a degree in law. Christine Kangaloo began her legal career in 1985, working alongside her father, Carlyle at his law firm in San Fernando, Trinidad. Their professional partnership continued until his passing in 1996.

== Political career ==
On 12 January 2001, she first became a member of parliament as an opposition senator under the tenure of Opposition Leader Patrick Manning. She then served as Vice President of the Senate and subsequently Minister in the Office of the Prime Minister in 2002. She was then appointed Minister of Legal Affairs in 2005. In the 2007 Trinidad and Tobago general election, she was elected to the House of Representatives as the People's National Movement (PNM) candidate for Pointe-à-Pierre and served as the Minister of Science, Technology and Tertiary Education. On 23 September 2015 she was elected as President of the Senate.

She was president of the Senate of Trinidad and Tobago from 2015 until her resignation to run for president in 2023. She is the only person to serve as President and Vice President of the Senate of Trinidad and Tobago and President of the Republic, the first woman to serve as Senate Vice President and third woman to serve as acting President of Trinidad and Tobago and Senate President. She became the second woman to serve as President of Trinidad and Tobago upon her assumption of office on 20 March 2023. During her tenure as President of the Senate (2015–2023), she acted as President of the Republic on 33 separate occasions before being formally elected to the office by the Electoral College on 20 January 2023.

== Honours ==
=== National honours ===
Order of the Republic of Trinidad and Tobago

=== Foreign honours ===
  (India)
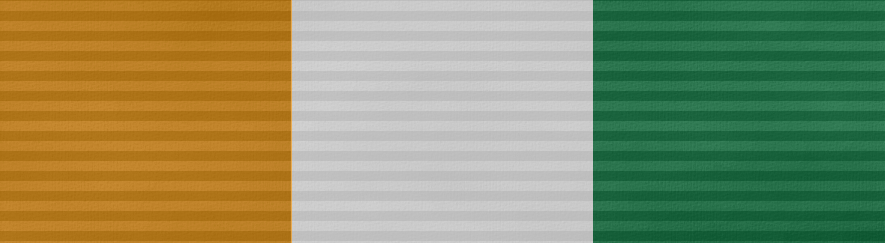
  - Pravasi Bharatiya Samman

== Notes ==
Political offices
| New title | Minister in the Office of the Prime Minister (Social Services Delivery); 2002–2005 | Position abolished |
| Preceded by Peter Taylor | Minister of Legal Affairs; 2005–2007 | Succeeded by Prakash Ramadhar |
| Preceded by Mustapha Abdul-Hamid | Minister of Science, Technology and Tertiary Education; 2007–2010 | Succeeded by Fazal Karim |
| Preceded by Raziah Ahmed | President of the Senate of Trinidad and Tobago; 2015–2023 | Succeeded by Nigel de Freitas |
| Preceded by Paula-Mae Weekes | President of Trinidad and Tobago; 2023–present | Incumbent |
