= Timothy Hamel-Smith =

Trinidadian politician

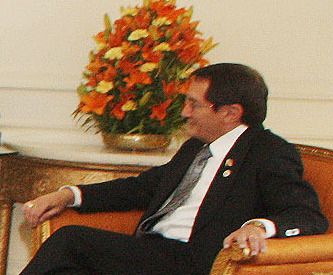

President of the Senate of Trinidad and Tobago
- In office 18 June 2010 – 3 February 2015
- Preceded by: Danny Montano
- Succeeded by: Raziah Ahmed

Personal details
- Born: 2 October 1948 (age 78)
- Education: The College of Law of England and Wales

Timothy Hamel-Smith is a Trinidadian politician and lawyer, and former President of the Senate of Trinidad and Tobago.

Hamel-Smith was born on 2 October 1948 in Trinidad. He graduated from The College of Law of England and Wales. He worked as a lawyer in his private practice.

Hamel-Smith was elected President of the Senate from 18 June 2010 to 2 February 2015. He was nominated by Kamla Persad-Bissessar. He was removed from the position of Senate President by Persad-Bissessar in February 2015. Later Hamel-Smith has led a small political party called HOPE.
