= Canboulay =

Carnival in Trinidad and Tobago

Canboulay (from the French cannes brulées, meaning burnt cane) is a precursor to Trinidad and Tobago Carnival. The festival is also where calypso music has its roots. It was originally a harvest festival, at which drums, singing, dancing and chanting were an integral part. After Emancipation (1834), it developed into an outlet and a festival for former indentured laborers and freed slaves who were banned from participating in the masquerade carnival events – derived from European Christian traditions – of the colonial elite, and whose drums and religious observances were also outlawed in the late 19th century. Consequently, Canboulay has played an important role in the development of the music of Trinidad and Tobago, for it was the banning of percussion instruments in the 1880s that led to the surreptitious innovations that gave birth to steelpan music. It is re-enacted in Port of Spain each Carnival Friday in Trinidad.

== See also ==
- Canboulay riots
