= Barendra Sinanan =

Trinidadian politician

Barendra Judistra Sinanan
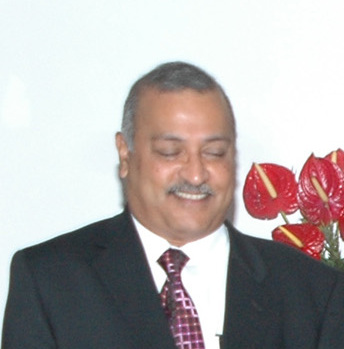

Speaker of the House of Representatives of Trinidad and Tobago
- In office 17 October 2002 – 18 June 2010
- Preceded by: Rupert Griffith
- Succeeded by: Wade Mark

Personal details
- Born: 4 October 1948 (age 78)
- Party: People's National Movement
- Education: The College of Law of England and Wales

Barendra Judistra Sinanan is a Trinidadian politician and lawyer, and former Speaker of the House of Representatives of Trinidad and Tobago.

Sinanan was born on 4 October 1948 in Trinidad and Tobago. He studied at the University Tutorial College in London and The College of Law of England and Wales. He worked as a lawyer in his private practice.

Sinanan was first elected to the House of Representatives in 1995 as People's National Movement candidate, until November 2000. He was elected Speaker of the House of Representatives on 17 October 2002, and re-elected once until 2010.
