= Ganace Ramdial =

Trinidad and Tobago politician (1935–2006)

President of the Senate of Trinidad and Tobago
- In office 27 November 1995 – 5 April 2002
- Preceded by: Emmanuel Carter
- Succeeded by: Linda Baboolal

Personal details
- Born: 21 January 1935
- Died: 1 July 2006 (aged 71)

Ganace Ramdial was a Trinidad and Tobago politician and President of the Senate.

Ramdial was born in 1935. He worked as an attorney-at-law, and served as chairman of several public and private boards. He had also leadership positions in the Institute of Banking of Trinidad and Tobago and Trinidad Cooperative Bank.

Ramdial was elected as President of the Senate on 27 November 1995 and re-elected on 12 January 2001. He was the presidential candidate of Basdeo Panday of United National Congress in the 2003 presidential elections.

Ramdial died on 1 July 2006.
