= Emmanuel Carter =

Civil servant and politician from Trinidad and Tobago

Joseph Emmanuel Carter

President of the Senate of Trinidad and Tobago
- In office 12 March 1990 – 27 November 1995
- Preceded by: Michael J. Williams
- Succeeded by: Ganace Ramdial

Personal details
- Born: 18 December 1929
- Died: 21 January 2015 (aged 85)

Joseph Emmanuel Carter (18 December 1929 – 21 January 2015) was a Trinidad and Tobago civil servant and politician. He served as President of the Senate between 1990 and 1995.

== Early life ==
Joseph Emmanuel Carter was born on 18 December 1929 and educated at Queen's Royal College. in Trinidad and Tobago.

== Career ==
He joined the Public Service in 1948 and after serving in the Colonial Secretary's Office he was transferred to the Legislature Department in 1954 where he served for 35 years until retirement in 1989. Notably, within three months of his retirement, he was appointed Senator and elected as President of the Senate on 12 March 1990. Following General Elections in December 1991, which saw a change in Government, he was re-elected President of the Senate in January 1992 and continued to serve in this capacity until 1995.

Carter served as acting President of Trinidad and Tobago in 1990, during which he signed an amnesty declaration, related to the Jamaat al Muslimeen coup attempt. The amnesty, after a long and convoluted series of legal proceedings, was eventually deemed invalid by the Privy Council, overturning local judgments. But by that stage, the Privy Council said it would be oppressive to try the insurrectionists involved in 1990 – the Jamaat al Muslimeen – again.

Before independence, he was appointed Second Clerk Assistant of the Legislative Council in 1960 and was Clerk Assistant House of Representatives in 1961. After independence, he became Clerk of the Senate and Deputy Administrative Head of Parliament in 1964 and exofficio assistant secretary of the local CPA branch. He was promoted to Clerk, House of Representatives and Administrative Head of Parliament in 1975.

Carter served for 25 years as secretary and assistant secretary of the local CPA branch, and during that time he was able to engage parliamentary conferences all over the Commonwealth—in Uganda, Bahamas, in Trinidad and Tobago, Malawi, Sri Lanka, India, Canada, New Zealand, Fiji, Kenya, United Kingdom, Malaysia and Saskatchewan in Canada.

== Honors and awards ==
Carter was awarded the Medal of Merit in 1989 for Public Service to Trinidad and Tobago.

== Personal life ==
Carter was married to Barbara (née Jadunath) and was the father of four - son Wayne and daughters Ann Marie, Lisa and Julia.

== Death ==
Carter died on 21 January 2015 during a family visit in Miami, Florida. He was 85.
