= Michael J. Williams (politician) =

Trinidad and Tobago politician (born 1929)

Michael Jay Williams

President of the Senate of Trinidad and Tobago
- In office 12 January 1987 – 12 March 1990
- Preceded by: Wahid Ali
- Succeeded by: Emmanuel Carter

Personal details
- Born: 16 October 1929 (age 96)

Michael Jay Williams (born 16 October 1929) is a Trinidad and Tobago politician and businessman.

The son of Louis Jay Williams and brother of Ronald Jay Williams, Michael Williams attended Queen's University, Kingston, Ontario, Canada, to study engineering. He was appointed to the Senate of Trinidad and Tobago by A. N. R. Robinson following the National Alliance for Reconstruction victory in the 1986 General Elections. Williams served as President of the Senate between 1986 and 1990. As senate president, Williams served as acting President of Trinidad and Tobago.

He was married to Teresa Anna Tang and had 11 children, five sons and six daughters.
