= Rudolph Charles =

Trinidad and Tobago musician

Rudolph Charles (1 October 1938 – 29 March 1985) was a musician and instrument maker of the steelpan, but most notably, he was a pioneer and leader of the steelband movement in Trinidad and Tobago. Also known as Charlo, The Hammer and Trail, among other names, he led Desperadoes Steel Orchestra to 10 various victories from 1965 to 1985, including six Panoramas, two Classical Music Festivals, one Best Bomb and one Best Playing Steel Orchestra.

== Background ==
Charles was born as fourth of nine children and grew up in Laventille, a ward of Trinidad, near the capital Port of Spain. He was one of the two well known and very popular Trinidadians who was born and grew up in Laventille the other is the Queen of Bacchanal Destra Garcia. He joined the Desperadoes Steel Orchestra in 1958 and was their bandleader and tuner from 1961 until his death at the age 46 in 1985. Charles invented several instruments for the steelband, including the Nine Bass, the Rocket Pans or the Twelve Bass. He also invited other pan tuners, such as Bertie Marshall, to collaborate with him.

Rudolph Charles engaged himself strongly in the steelband movement. The boycott of the national Panorama in 1979 was a result of Charles' fight for higher recognition of pannists.

He died aged 46 on 29 March 1985, and his funeral took place on 4 April at the Cathedral of the Immaculate Conception.

== Legacy ==
In 1986 David Rudder sang the composition "The Hammer" dedicated to Rudolph Charles.

The Rudolph Charles Pan Innovation Award was founded to encourage emerging tuners, and is a part of the Trinidad and Tobago National Steelband Music Festival.

In 2005 Destra Garcia paid tribute to Charles and her home town with a song entitled "Laventille (The Hammer Revisited)", a duet with Rudder.

At UK Panorama 2013, Real Steel's winning calypso "Hammer Time" was dedicated to Rudolph Charles.

In 2014, Rudolph Charles was posthumously awarded the Chaconia Medal (Silver) for his contribution to culture at the anniversary of Independence National Awards.
