= Trinidad All-Steel Pan Percussion Orchestra =

Steel band

The Trinidad All-Steel Pan Percussion Orchestra (TASPO) was formed to participate in the 1951 Festival of Britain, having its first performance on 26 July at London's Southbank Centre. The group was the first steelband to travel abroad from Trinidad and Tobago, presenting the newly invented steelpan to an international audience.

== Members ==
Lieutenant Joseph Nathaniel Griffith (born in Barbados) was the conductor of the band. Griffith was originally part of the Trinidad Police Band.

Player	Band	DOB	DOD
Cecil “Coye” Forde	Invaders	1928/09/14	2012/12/25
Orman "Patsy" Haynes	Casablanca	1930/02/22	1985/10/29
Elliot "Ellie" Mannette	Invaders	1927/11/05	2018/08/29
Belgrave Bonaparte	Southern Symphony	1932	
Anthony "Tony" Williams	North Stars	1931/06/24	2021/12/21
Carlton "Sonny" Roach	Sun Valley	1924/08/06	1986
Philmore "Boots" Davidson	City Syncopators	1928	1993
Sterling Betancourt	Crossfire	1924/03/01	
Andrew "Pan" de la Bastide	Chicago	1927/12/01	2002/11/17
Dudley Smith	Rising Sun		
Winston "Spree" Simon	Fascinators (Tokyo)	1930	1976/11/18
Theophilus "Black James" Stephens	Free French	1933/11/04	2001/11/06

On 6 July 1951, TASPO left Trinidad for England on the SS San Mateo. Carlton "Sonny" Roach fell ill and was left behind in Martinique. The steelband performed at the Southbank Centre, London, on 26 July 1951, as well as elsewhere in Britain and in Paris, France. TASPO returned to Trinidad on 12 December 1951, the only exception being Sterling Betancourt, who stayed in London. Betancourt had been vitally involved in building up Notting Hill Carnival.

== Legacy ==
On 26 July 2022, the anniversary of TASPO's 1951 "introduction of Steelpan to the world" during the Festival of Britain was celebrated with a Google Doodle.

In July 2026, the 75th anniversary of TASPOs performance at London's South Bank was celebrated at the Royal Festival Hall.
