= Canboulay riots =

Disturbances in the British colony of Trinidad in 1881 and 1884

The Canboulay riots were a series of disturbances in the British colony of Trinidad in 1881 and 1884. The riots came about in response to efforts by the colonial police to restrict aspects of the island's annual Carnival festival. In Port of Spain, San Fernando, and Princes Town, angered Trinidadians rioted in response to the actions of police. The violence of the Canboulay Riots resulted in many injuries, as well as fatalities. As a result of the riots, new government restrictions placed on Canboulay traditions. New musical instruments and styles were created in reaction to these prohibitions, which influenced the development of calypso and later soca. Additionally, the pre-carnival tradition of J'ouvert originates with Canboulay and the Canboulay Riots.

== Background ==
The annual Carnival in Trinidad dates back to the 1780s, when an influx of immigrants from the French West Indies emigrated to Trinidad in response to the Cédula de Población. These immigrants included French planters and 'free coloureds' (free people of mixed race), as well as enslaved Africans. During the Carnival seasons, white planters staged elaborate masquerade balls and other celebrations after Christmas as a "farewell to the flesh" before the season of Lent. Enslaved Africans and 'free coloureds' were forbidden by law to participate in Carnival celebrations such as street festivities. Africans are said to have staged their own mini-carnivals, but using their own rituals and folklore and imitating or mocking their masters' masquerade balls.

Traditions were introduced to Trinidad by enslaved Africans during the 18th century. These include the calinda, a form of martial art involving stick-fighting. The calinda is likely of African origin, and is accompanied by music and dancing. Enslaved Africans also celebrated night-time harvest festival characterized by drums, singing, calinda dancing, chanting, and stick-fighting. The term "Canboulay" comes from the French cannes broullee, meaning "burnt cane". The name may refer to the putting out of cane fires, the pre-harvest cane burning for pest control, or the burning of cane as an act of sabotage during the time of slavery. Cane harvesting was a labor-intensive process, involving forced marches of slaved Enslaved Africans from neighboring plantations in order to more efficiently harvest the cane.

Trinidad was captured by the British in 1797. In 1833, the British government passed the Slavery Abolition Act, with Emancipation taking effect 1 August 1834. After Emancipation, freed Africans first celebrated their freedom on 1 August the anniversary of their emancipation, and soon began celebrating emancipation during the Carnival season. As part of this transformation, they started carrying burning sugarcane or cannes brulees (French for "burnt cane")—in celebration of Canboulay. The carnival soon featured dancing by men and women in masks. The people would also gather in kaiso tents where a "chantwell" (or lead singer) would lead them in song to vent their feelings. Kaiso music has its origins in West Africa and was brought over by the enslaved Africans who (in the early history of the art form) used it to sing about their masters. Verbal confrontations sometimes started in song duels between the chantwells, they often worsened to physical violence. Carnival was often marred by clashes between groups of revellers carrying sticks and lighted torches.

The British colonial authorities disapproved of Canboulay because of its bacchanalian overtones, but the festival was popular with the majority of the population on the island. In the 1850s, colonial authorities attempted to ban or control Canboulay several times. In the early 1880s, Captain Arthur Baker became the head of Trinidad's police force. He was determined to end Canboulay, which he perceived as a threat to public order. In 1880, Baker used a 1868 ordinance to stop Canboulay celebrations, by requiring revelers to surrender their torches and drums.

== Riots (1881-1884) ==
In 1881, colonial police attempted to prevent Canboulay festivities from taking place in Port of Spain. Special paramilitary police were drafted in from England to help with this operation. Canboulay revelers in Port of Spain, however, banded together in rebellion. A violent struggle took place between the police forces and the Canboulay band members and stickfighters. The violence of the Canboulay Riots resulted in many injuries, as well as fatalities. Governor Sir Sanford Freeling confined police to barracks in order to calm down the situation.

Freeling was recalled as governor in 1883, and Baker again sought to suppress Canboulay in 1884—this time in the southern cities of San Fernando and Princes Town. In Princes Town, the masqueraders attacked the police station after magistrate Hobson decided to confine the police to barracks because the crowd was too large. After Hobson was felled with a stone, the police opened fire on the rioters killing a youth and seriously wounding two others causing the crowd to flee. There were also serious clashes between police and rioters in San Fernando during Carnival, with the police eventually being able to suppress the riots and restore order.

In 1884, the colonial government passed the Peace Preservation Act, in an attempt to prevent violence breaking out during the Carnival. The Act prohibited public carrying of torches, drumming, blowing horns, and stick-fighting (or the assembly of ten or more people with sticks). It also established the official start of Carnival as 6:00 A.M. (the Monday before Lent).

== Legacy ==
The Canboulay Riots are an important part of Trinidad's history. The riots are commemorated annually via a Canboulay reenactment which marks the start of Carnival. The reenactment is sometimes held in the summer, as well, during the Caribbean Festival of Arts (Carifesta).

Many new musical instruments were created as a result of the prohibitions of riots and the Peace Preservation Act. The tamboo bamboo was introduced in the 1890s as a substitute for the drums and sticks. Tamboo bamboo bands were formed, consisting of multiple different instruments, each cut from bamboo: boom, foulé, cutter, and chandler. The boom serves as the bass instrument, is usually about five feet long, and is played by stamping it on the ground. The foulé is a higher-pitched instrument, providing the tenor pitch. It consists of two pieces of bamboo, each about a foot long, and is played by striking these pieces end to end. The cutter is the highest- pitched instrument in the ensemble, providing the soprano pitch. It is made from a thinner piece of bamboo (of varying length) and is struck with a stick. The chandler provides the alto sound, and is slightly larger than the cutter. These four types of instruments combined to beat out rhythms that accompanied the chantwells. The bottle-and-spoon joined drums as percussion instruments. Tamboo bamboo bands were a staple of carnival celebrations for many years, but were gradually replaced by the steel band. In the 1930s, steel pans became widely used, and remain an integral part of Carnival music contests, such as Panorama.
