= Wahid Ali =

Trinidad and Tobago politician (1928–2008)

President of the Senate of Trinidad and Tobago
- In office 6 August 1971 – 12 January 1987
- Preceded by: J. Hamilton Maurice
- Succeeded by: Michael Williams

Personal details
- Born: 27 June 1928 Xeres Road, Chaguanas
- Died: 9 August 2008 (aged 80)

Wahid Ali was a Trinidad and Tobago politician and the longest-serving President of the Senate.

Ali was born on 27 June 1928 at Xeres Road, Chaguanas. He was first appointed as a member of the Senate of Trinidad and Tobago in 1970. Ali was appointed President of the Senate of Trinidad and Tobago on 6 August 1971, and he served until 12 January 1987. As President of the Senate, he served as Acting President of the Republic on twenty occasions.

He died on 9 August 2008. He was described as a devout Muslim.
