= Occah Seapaul =

Trinidad and Tobago politician (born 1940)

Occah Seapaul MP

Speaker of the House of Representatives of Trinidad and Tobago
- In office 13 January 1992 – 26 November 1995
- Prime Minister: Patrick Manning
- Preceded by: Nizam Mohammed
- Succeeded by: Hector McClean

Personal details
- Born: April 4, 1940 (age 86)

Occah Seapaul is a Trinidadian and Tobagonian lawyer and former Speaker of the House of Representatives.

Seapaul was born on 4 April 1940. She is an attorney. She was called to the bar in London in June 1964. She was the first woman to hold the position Master of the Court in the Caribbean. She was also the first woman appointed as deputy director of public prosecution.

Seapaul was elected as the first female Speaker of the House of Representatives on 13 January 1992. The government of Patrick Manning placed her under house arrest in August 1995, because she was allegedly collaborating with the opposition of United National Congress when an MP of Manning's People's National Movement was expelled from the Parliament. She eventually ceased to hold the speakership on 26 November 1995.

Ralph Maraj is the brother of Seapaul.
