= Bertie Marshall =

Trinidad and Tobago musician

Bertram Lloyd Marshall ORTT (6 February 1936 – 17 October 2012), known as Bertie Marshall, was a pioneer, musician and music instrument maker of the steelpan.

== Career ==
Marshall was born in 1936, in Port-of-Spain, Trinidad and Tobago. As a child, he roamed the streets of John John and Success Village, Laventille. As a boy, he watched pioneering tuners at work and came into contact with Winston "Spree" Simon who created the multiple notes on the convex metal containers used for making pans. These encounters sparked his interest in the steelpan and began his secret association with pan and panmen.

Marshall began playing openly after his mother died in 1954, but had tuned his first pan long before that. At the age of 14, he got an old ping pong from Tokyo Steelband and tried to retune it, using his harmonica. By 18, he began tuning pans, guided by other tuners such as Carl Greenidge. Marshall was dissatisfied with what he called ping pong's inferior tone.

In 1956, Bertie Marshall changed the method of steelpan tuning from the inharmonic style. He tuned notes by octaves to produce harmonics. This harmonic tuning method is used for frontline steelband instruments.

Marshall is also credited with inventing the Double Tenor instrument and for being the first person to amplify the steelpan. He developed the Quadrophonics, Six Pan and Twelve Bass, together with Rudolph Charles of Desperadoes Steel Orchestra from Laventille. Marshall had been building and tuning instruments for Desperadoes since 1970.

Marshall was part of a project of the Caribbean Industrial Research Institute in 1982, which investigated the possibilities of machine production of steelpans. Because of Marshall's contributions to Trinidad & Tobago's National Instrument, the T&T government awarded him their Chaconia Gold Medal, given for "Outstanding Service to the Country". That was the first time the award was given in the field of music. He further received the Order of the Republic of Trinidad and Tobago, presented by President George Maxwell Richards in 2008.

== Death ==
Bertie Marshall died at the age of 76 on 17 October 2012, with his children at his bedside. He left behind three children, Claude, Claudine and Leanora "Jill" and eight grandchildren.

== Readings ==
Felix I. R. Blake: The Trinidad and Tobago Steel Pan: History and Evolution. ISBN 0-9525528-0-9
