= Danny Montano =

Trinidad and Tobago politician

President of the Senate of Trinidad and Tobago
- In office 17 December 2007 – 18 June 2010
- Preceded by: Linda Baboolal
- Succeeded by: Timothy Hamel-Smith

Danny Montano is a politician from Trinidad and Tobago. He was first elected as a member of the Senate of Trinidad and Tobago on 27 November 1995, and became Minister of Housing on 26 December 2001. On 15 October 2002 he became Minister of Science, Technology and Tertiary Education, stepping down on 9 November 2003 to become Minister of Legal Affairs a day later. On 14 May 2005 he was appointed Minister of Labour and Small and Micro Enterprise Development, and since 17 December 2007 has been President of the Senate.
