= Communist Party of Trinidad and Tobago =

- Founder: Hardial Bains (alleged)
- Founded: 1979
- Newspaper: Class Struggle
- Ideology: Communism; Marxism–Leninism; Anti-revisionism

The Communist Party of Trinidad and Tobago was a pro-Albanian Marxist–Leninist political party in Trinidad and Tobago. The party was founded in 1979. One source claims it was founded by Hardial Bains, the leader of Communist Party of Canada (Marxist–Leninist). CPTT published a newspaper called Class Struggle. Many of the members of the party renounced their hardline communist stances by the end of the 1980s, coinciding with the fall of the Soviet Union. Former members Michael Als and Wade Mark were involved in party politics in the late 1990s.

== See also ==
- List of anti-revisionist groups
