= Nigel de Freitas =

Trinidadian politician (born 1979)

President of the Senate of Trinidad and Tobago
- In office 18 January 2023 – 23 May 2025
- Preceded by: Christine Kangaloo
- Succeeded by: Wade Mark

Personal details
- Born: 1979 (age 45–46)

Nigel de Freitas is a Trinidadian politician from People's National Movement. He was president of the Senate of Trinidad and Tobago in 2023–2025.

He was born in 1979. He attended Bishops High School in Tobago. He got a bachelor's degree in marine and freshwater biology from University of Guelph, Canada.

He was appointed as a government senator on 23 September 2015. He was subsequently elected as vice president of the Senate. He was minister in the ministry of agriculture, land and fisheries from 16 March 2022 to January 2023, when he was elected president of the Senate.
