= Raziah Ahmed =

Trinidadian politician

President of the Senate of Trinidad and Tobago
- In office 3 February 2015 – 23 September 2015
- Preceded by: Timothy Hamel-Smith
- Succeeded by: Christine Kangaloo

Raziah Ahmed is a former Senator of the Republic of Trinidad and Tobago.

== Political involvement ==
Former President of the Senate of Trinidad and Tobago - 2015, she was the second woman in the history of Trinidad and Tobago to act as President of her country. She was the second muslim to held the position of the President of the Senate. She is a former Minister of State in the Ministry of Gender Youth and Child Development. She is the author of a continuing series of Children's books: the Nobel, Gifted Prophet series, published in the USA. Currently she is a Part Time Lecturer at a popular Business School. Senator Ahmed is a Motivational Speaker and Financial Planning Consultant (RFC until 2008). She received her MBA from the University of the West Indies, Institute of Business. She was a Columnist with the Sunday Guardian of Trinidad and Tobago and with the Sunday Newsday. Her columns Money Matters, and Wallet Watch dealt with financial advice.

Senator Ahmed was the President of TTAIFA (Trinidad and Tobago Association of Insurance and Financial Advisors), was a Board Member of CARAIFA, where she served as Chairman of the CARAIFA FOUNDATION. (Caribbean Association of Insurance and Financial Advisors), has 12 years consecutive membership of MDRT (Million Dollar Round Table), with 8 Court of the Table memberships and 1 Top of the Table. She was the first female Agency Manager at Colonial Life Insurance Company Ltd.

Raziah Ahmed née Baksh attended Iere High School, and was Valedictorian 1975 and awarded the Iere Gold Medal for Most Outstanding All Round Student. She studied at Mona Jamaica, under a scholarship from Trinidad Tesoro Petroleum Co. the forerunner company to Petrotrin.
