= Order of the Republic of Trinidad and Tobago =

- Type: Single class distinguished service decoration
- Awarded for: distinguished and outstanding service to Trinidad and Tobago.
- Presented by: Trinidad and Tobago
- Eligibility: Nationals and Non-Nationals
- Post-nominals: ORTT
- Status: Currently awarded
- Established: 2008
- Final award: 2025

Highlights
- Total: 31
- Total awarded posthumously: 5
- Ribbon bar of the award

Precedence
- Next (higher): none
- Next (lower): Chaconia Medal
- Related: Trinity Cross

The Order of the Republic of Trinidad and Tobago (ORTT) is the highest honour of Trinidad and Tobago. Established in 2008, it replaced the Trinity Cross as the decoration for distinguished and outstanding service to the country.

== Recipients ==
- Anthony Williams (2008)
- Bertie Marshall (2008)
- Brian Copeland (2008)
- George Chambers (2008, posthumous)
- Giselle Salandy (2009)
- Kamaluddin Mohammed (2010)
- Karl Hudson-Phillips (2010)
- Ulric Cross (2011)
- Keshorn Walcott (2012)
- Anthony Carmona (2013)
- Ivor Archie (2013)
- Makandal Daaga (2013)
- Errol McLead (2015)
- Winston Dookeran (2015)
- Courtenay Bartholomew (2017)
- Paula-Mae Weekes (2017)
- Marilyn Gordon (2022)
- Christine Kangaloo (2023)
- Patrick Hosein, Mark Loquan, Russell Martineau (2024)
- Narendra Modi (2025)
