= Winston Simon =

Trinidad and Tobago musician

Winston "Spree" Simon (1930 – 18 April 1976) was a Trinidadian inventor, pioneer and musician of the steelpan.

== Life ==
Simon was born in Laventille, Trinidad. He is credited with the invention of the Ping Pong steelpan instrument. Simon also was part of TASPO, the Trinidad All Steel Percussion Orchestra and visited Great Britain in 1951.

Winston "Spree" Simon worked closely with Anthony Williams, who later invented the fourth and fifth soprano pan. Simon also gave Bertie Marshall significant impulses for his work in developing harmonical tuning.

The American musician and composer Van Dyke Parks celebrated the life of Winston Simon in the song "Tribute to Spree" on his album Clang of the Yankee Reaper written and first recorded by Lord Kitchener.

Simon is said to have invented the 8-note ping pong in 1943 and the 14-note ping pong in 1946.

== See also ==
- Steelpan
- Ellie Mannette
