= Liam Teague =

Trinidadian composer, arranger and steelpan performer

- Born: 1974 (age 51–52); Trinidad and Tobago
- Education: Northern Illinois University
- Occupations: Composer, arranger, musician, professor
- Instruments: Steelpan
- Website: liamteague.com

Liam Teague (born in 1974) is a Trinidadian composer, arranger, and steelpan performer.

== Life ==
Teague was born in Trinidad and Tobago in 1974. He attended Northern Illinois University in the US, where he earned his bachelor's degree in music (1997), as well as his master's degree in music (1999). He currently works as a professor at Northern Illinois University, where he teaches music and serves as the Chair of Steelpan Studies.

== Discography ==
- 1993: Hands Like Lightning (Engine Room Recording)
- 1996: Emotions of Steel (Engine Room Recording)
- 2000: T'NT (Sack Records)
- 2010: Open Window (Rhythmic Union Records)

== Awards and honours ==
- Steel Band Professor and Director at Northern Illinois University
- Winner of the Trinidad and Tobago National Steelband Festival Solo Championship
- Winner of the Saint Louis Symphony Volunteers Association Young Artist Competition
- Appeared in concert with Grammy-nominated musicians Paquito D'Rivera, Dave Samuels, Zakir Hussain and Dame Evelyn Glennie.
- Awarded national honour of the Hummingbird Medal (Silver)
- Anthony N. Sabga Caribbean Award for Excellence
- Received keys to the City of San Fernando
