= Steelpan =

Musical instrument from Trinidad and Tobago

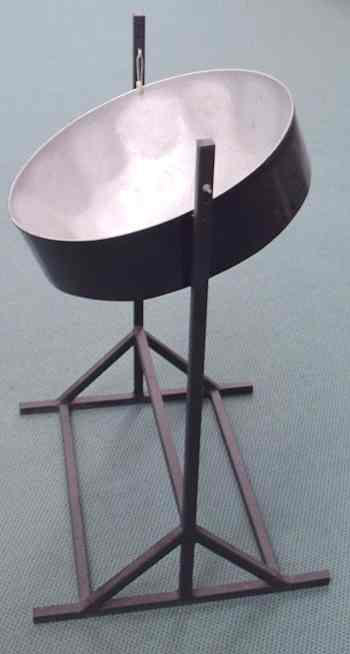

Percussion instrument
- Other names: Steel drum, pan
- Classification: Percussion
- Hornbostel–Sachs classification: 111.241.12, 111.241.22 (Gongs with divided surface sounding different pitches, Sets of gongs with divided surface sounding different pitches)
- Developed: 1880–1937

Playing range
- A1–G6

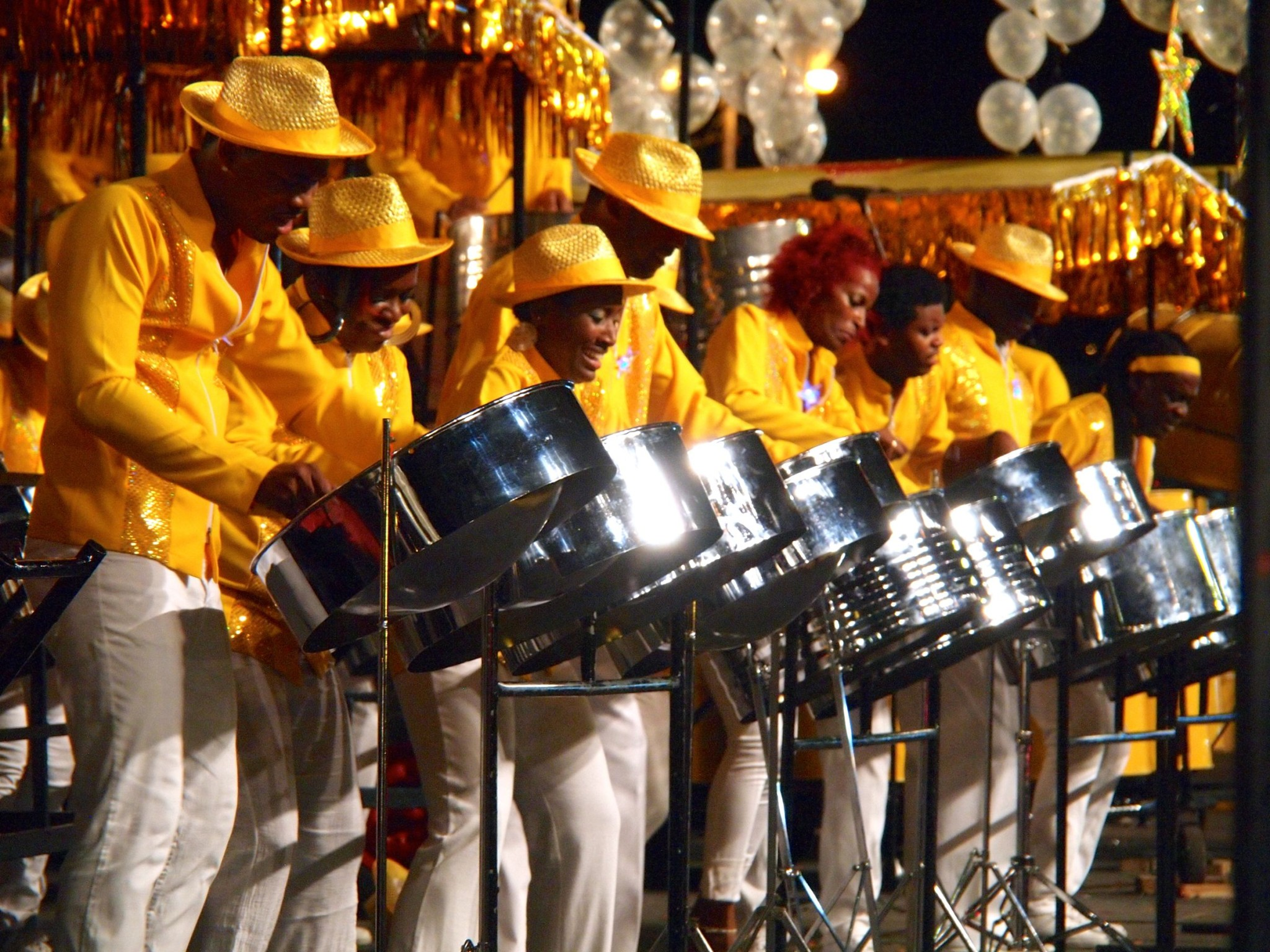
A steelband in Trinidad and Tobago, 2013

The steelpan (also known as a pan or steel drum) is a musical instrument originating in Trinidad and Tobago. Steelpan musicians are called pannists.

In 1992, the steelpan was declared Trinidad and Tobago’s national instrument by Prime Minister Patrick Manning. This helped turn the steelpan into a source of national pride and cultural identity, recognized both locally and internationally.

The steelpan developed in Trinidad and Tobago during the 1930s and 1940s and evolved from earlier Carnival percussion traditions, including Tamboo bamboo. It became an important part of Trinidad and Tobago Carnival and is now the country's national instrument.

In 2023, the United Nations General Assembly declared 11 August as World Steelpan Day. The following year, the Parliament of Trinidad and Tobago officially recognised the steelpan as the country's national instrument.

== Description ==
The modern pan is a chromatically pitched percussion instrument made from 200-litre industrial drums.

Drum refers to the steel drum containers from which the pans are made; the steel drum is more correctly called a steel pan or pan as it falls into the idiophone family of instruments, and so is not a drum (which is a membranophone). Some steelpans are made to play in the Pythagorean musical cycle of fourths and fifths.

A pan is played using a pair of straight sticks tipped with rubber; the size and type of rubber tip varies according to the class of pan being played. Some musicians use four pansticks, holding two in each hand. This grew out of Trinidad and Tobago's early 20th-century Carnival percussion groups known as tamboo bamboo.

The pan is the national instrument of Trinidad and Tobago and appears on the country's current coat of arms.

== Origin ==
Steelpans developed in the early to mid 1900s, but with roots going back much earlier, including the talking drums of West African cultures which were used for ceremonies and communicating messages at a distance.

As a result of the transatlantic slave trade, African slaves were brought to the Americas, including Trinidad. In the 1780s, French colonists arrived in Trinidad and Tobago and brought street festival traditions. In 1785, plantation owners held the first Carnival in Trinidad. Many white plantation owners masqueraded as slaves and marched down the streets mocking African slave dress, singing, and dance customs, including banging on talking drums. Though they were mimicked, enslaved Africans were not allowed to join the festivities. In response, the Africans organized underground Carnivals of their own, taking place in cabins and backyards. Inspired by ancient traditions, Africans incorporated masks, feathers, beads, and drumming.

In 1789, Spanish governor of Trinidad José María Chacón issued a directive that all Africans (the majority of the population) would observe Roman Catholic religion and all Christian holy days. The purpose was to further erase West African culture and religious beliefs. However, the enslaved Africans were able to preserve their traditions by camouflaging them within Christian holidays. For example, on Sundays, enslaved people would "put on their best clothes and go to drum dances held in different yards or on the land away from the plantation where they were allowed to grow their own crops...[They] would dance to the music and rhythms of the skin drums and gourd rattles."

In 1834, slaves were emancipated in Trinidad and Tobago following the Slavery Abolition Act 1833, but segregation and indentured servitude continued. After emancipation, Africans annually celebrated Canboulay, a harvest festival involving calypso drumming. In 1881, the Canboulay riots occurred, which were a series of revolts during the festival. After this, stick-fighting and African percussion music were banned throughout the 1880s. They were replaced by bamboo sticks beaten together, which were themselves banned in turn.

The first instruments developed in the evolution of steelpan were tamboo bamboos, tunable sticks made of bamboo wood. These were hit onto the ground and with other sticks in order to produce sound. Tamboo bamboo bands included percussion of a (gin) bottle and spoon. By the mid-1930s, bits of metal percussion were being used in the tamboo bamboo bands, the first probably being either the automobile brake hub "iron" or the biscuit drum "boom". The former replaced the gin bottle-and-spoon, and the latter the "bass" bamboo that was pounded on the ground.

In 1937, percussionists reappeared in Laventille, transformed as an orchestra of frying pans, dustbin lids, and oil drums. In 1941, the U.S. Navy established a presence in Trinidad. The pannists helped to popularise steelpan music among the soldiers, which began its international popularisation. At the time of the steelpan's popularity in Trinidad it was seen as being associated with a violent or derelict crowd. It was unacceptable for women to be involved in such activities. Culturally the stigma was focused on the idea that women belonged in the home or with the children and not out in the street with the pan players. As the instrument became more mainstream women were allowed to join and the stigma that went along with playing the instrument subsided. In 1939 the first all-steel band, Alexander's Ragtime Band, emerged, and by 1940 it had become the preferred carnival accompaniment of young underprivileged men.

The 55-gallon oil drum was used to make steelpans from around 1947. The Trinidad All-Steel Pan Percussion Orchestra (TASPO), formed to attend the Festival of Britain in 1951, was the first steelband whose instruments were all made from oil drums. They performed 26 July, thus introducing the steelpan and a new music genre to the world. Members of TASPO included Ellie Mannette and Winston "Spree" Simon. Hugh Borde led the National Steel Band of Trinidad & Tobago at the Commonwealth Arts Festival in England, as well as the Esso Tripoli Steel Band, which played at the World's Fair in Montreal, Canada, and later toured with Liberace. They were featured on an album with him.

Three steel pans were used onstage in the 1954 Broadway musical House of Flowers. When Trinidadian-born dancer Geoffrey Holder was hired for its cast, he suggested the incorporation of three drummers from his dance company, Michael Alexander (who made the instruments), Roderick Clavery, and Alphonso Marshall; the three doubled as dancers in the show.

=== Evolution and developments ===
Circle of fifths arrangement of notes on typical tenor (1), double second (2), double guitar (3) and tenor bass (4) pans

Anthony Williams designed the "fourths and fifths" arrangement of notes, known as the circle of fifths. This has become the standard form of note placement for lead pans. Other important developments include the tuning of harmonic overtones in individual notes, developed simultaneously and independently by Bertie Marshall and Alan Gervais.

In the United States, steelpan instruments were marketed as early as 1961.

The Caribbean Research Institute CARIRI investigated possibilities to mass-produce raw forms with the use of pressing machines in the 1970s. Much of this project took place in Sweden in collaboration with the Saab Company. Although first results were promising, the project has been abandoned due to lack of finances and support by local pan tuners in Trinidad. Another method of shaping the pan was attempted: by spinning. The pan was spun on a lathe-like device, and a roller on the end of a bar was used to sink the pan. While this did create pre-sunk pans, a problem was that there would often be scratches and grooves in the steel.

A Swiss steelpan manufacturer (PANArt) researched the field of fine-grain sheet steel and developed a deep-drawn raw form which was additionally hardened by nitriding. This process, and the new instruments they called pang, were presented at the International Conference of Steel pan and Science in Port-of-Spain in 2000.

Electronic steelpans have also been developed. One such version is the E-Pan, invented by Salmon Cupid, who holds utility patents for it. Another is the Percussive Harmonic Instrument (PHI).

== Construction ==
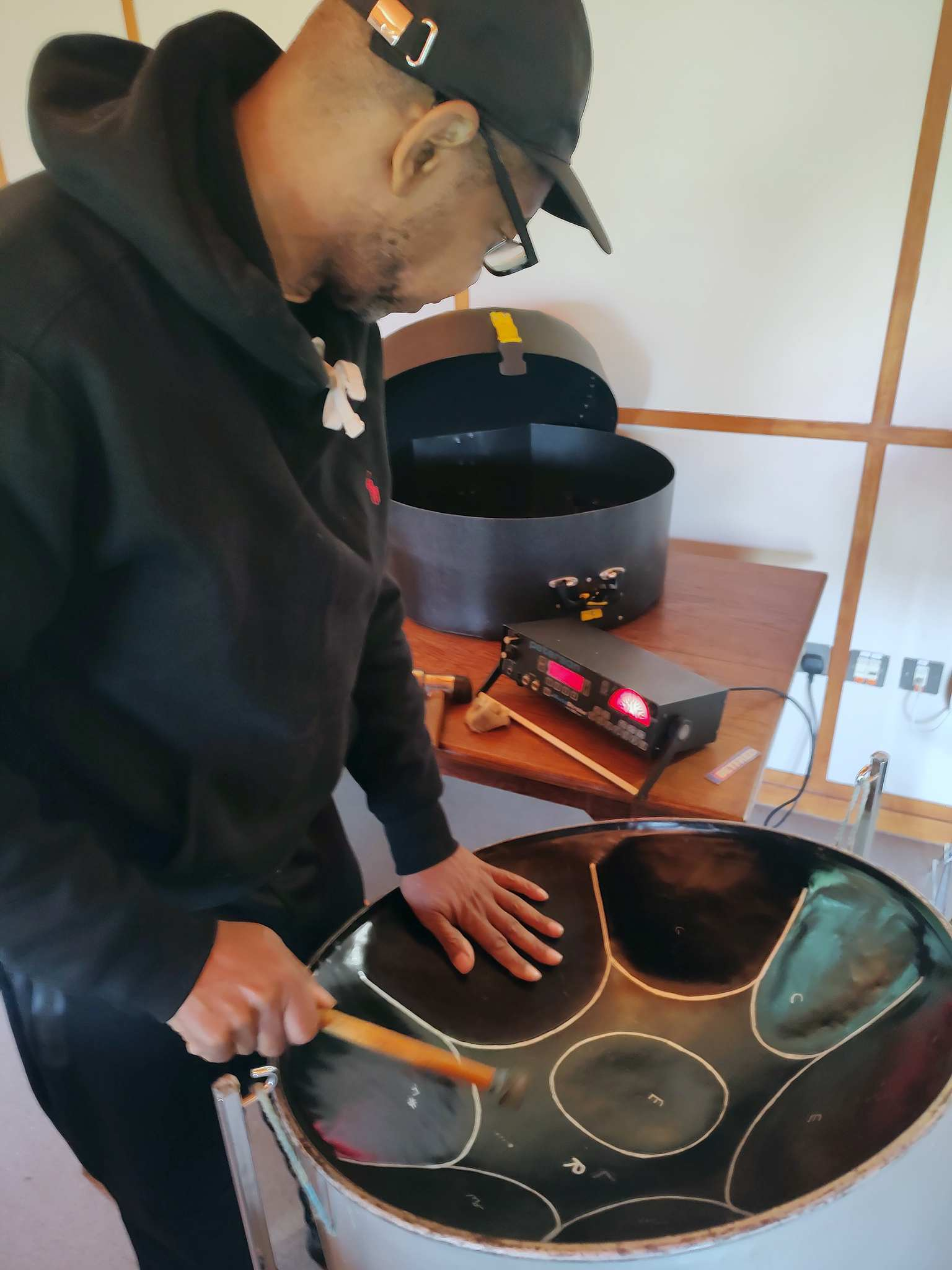
Tuning a steelpan with a strobe tuner

The note's size corresponds to the pitch—the larger the oval, the lower the tone.

The size of the instrument varies from one pan to another. It may have almost all of the "skirt" (the cylindrical part of the oil drum) cut off and around 30 soprano-range notes. It may use the entire drum with only three bass notes per pan, in which case one person may play six such pans. The length of the skirt generally corresponds to the tessitura (high or low range) of the drum. The pans are usually either painted or chrome plated. Other processes such as nickel plating, powdercoating, or hardening can also be applied as a finish.

Despite being a relatively new member of the percussion family, steelpan tuning techniques have advanced rapidly. Strobe tuners are ideally suited for the task. The need to see the first few overtones further makes a strobe tuner a necessity for steelpan tuning. Steelpan makers have used strobe tuners since it was discovered that, by adjusting the overtones (first (fundamental), second, and third partial), the pan's sound seemed to sparkle in a way that it did not previously.

There are several ways in which a steelpan may become out of tune (most commonly this is caused by playing the steelpan with excessive force and incorrect handling) and it is quite common that steelbands arrange to have their instruments tuned once or twice a year. A tuner must have great skill in their work to manage to make the notes sound both good and at the correct pitch. Much of the tuning work is performed using hammers.

== Classification ==
In the beginning of the steelband movement, players would play a single pan only, now commonly called around the neck instruments. Later on, some steelpans became chromatic by using multiple pans, particularly for the bass registers, which have fewer notes per pan owing to the larger sizes of the lower note areas. Following are some of the most popular instruments:

Instrument	Pitch	Inventor
Single Tenor, or Ping Pong	Soprano	Winston "Spree" Simon
Spiderweb Lead	Soprano	Tony Williams
Invader Lead	Soprano	Ellie Mannette
Double Tenor	Mezzo-soprano	Bertie Marshall
Double Second	Alto	Ellie Mannette
Double Guitar	Tenor	Jonathan Francis
Quadrophonic (four pans)	Tenor	Rudolph Charles
Quadduet	Baritone	Ellie Mannette
Triple Guitar	Baritone	Ellie Mannette
Cello	Baritone	Ellie Mannette
Tenor Bass	Bass	Ellie Mannette
Six Bass	Bass	Ellie Mannette
Nine Bass	Bass	Rudolph Charles
Twelve Bass	Bass	Rudolph Charles

== Music and competitions ==
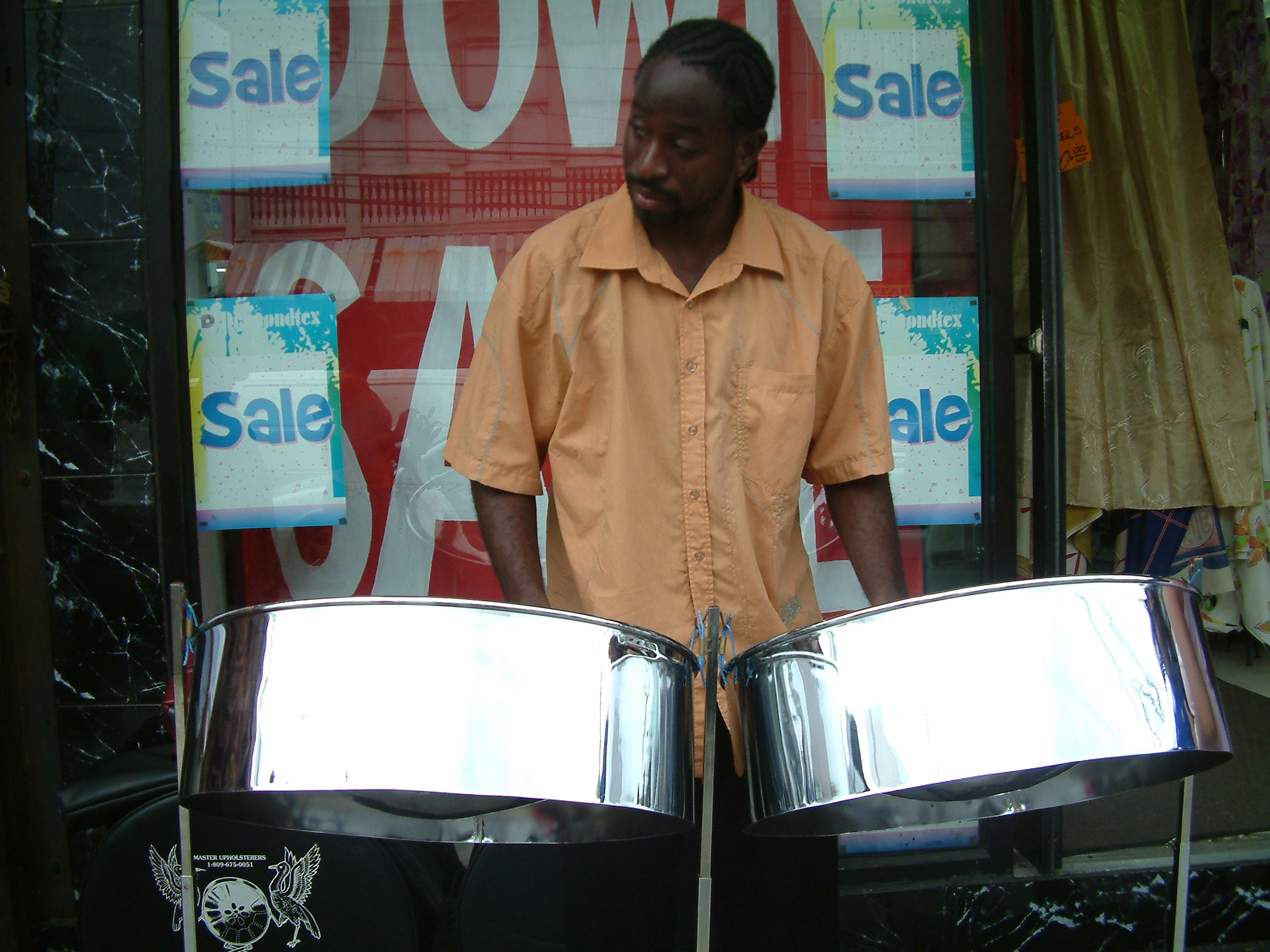
A musician playing the double tenor steelpan

The repertoire of the steelband is extensive. Steelbands in Trinidad have a tradition of re-interpreting the current year's calypsos for carnival performance; rarely will a calypso from a previous year be heard at carnival or the Panorama music competition. Bands that perform all year round (both in Trinidad and world-wide) have long prided themselves on being able to perform many types of music, particularly Latin and jazz numbers, film music and other popular tunes. Pannists also have a tradition of performing classical music which dates back to 1946, both in calypso tempo (known as "The Bomb") and straight (generally in concert or music festival contexts). In these contexts, accuracy and faithfulness to the original are highly prized.

An international festival, the World Steelband Music Festival, has been held intermittently in Trinidad since 1964, where steelbands perform a test piece (sometimes specially composed, or a selected calypso); a piece of choice (very often a "classic" or European art-music work); and calypso of choice, in a concert-style venue. Panorama, the largest steelband contest in the world, occurs during Carnival celebrations in Trinidad. In 2020, the world's first online steelpan competition, PanoGrama, was launched by Nevin Roach. Since 1978 a national Panorama competition has been held in the United Kingdom as part of the annual Notting Hill Carnival celebration. Brooklyn, NY, home to a large West Indian population, has hosted an annual Steelband Panorama since 1972 as part of its annual Labor Day Carnival festivities.

Steelpans were introduced to the genre of jazz fusion by players such as Dave Samuels and Othello Molineaux in the 1970s, and Jonathan Scales in the 2000s. They are featured in the early fusion album Morning Dance by Spyro Gyra.

== Pannists ==
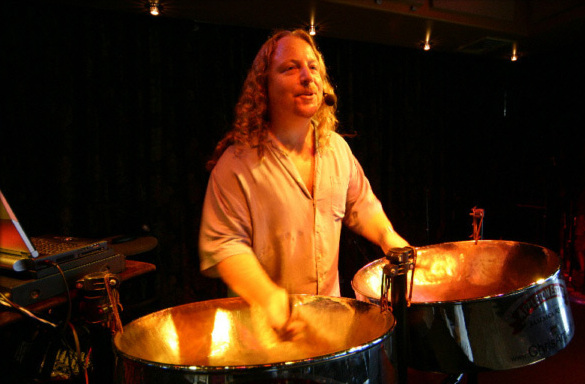
Steel pannist performing with a backing track

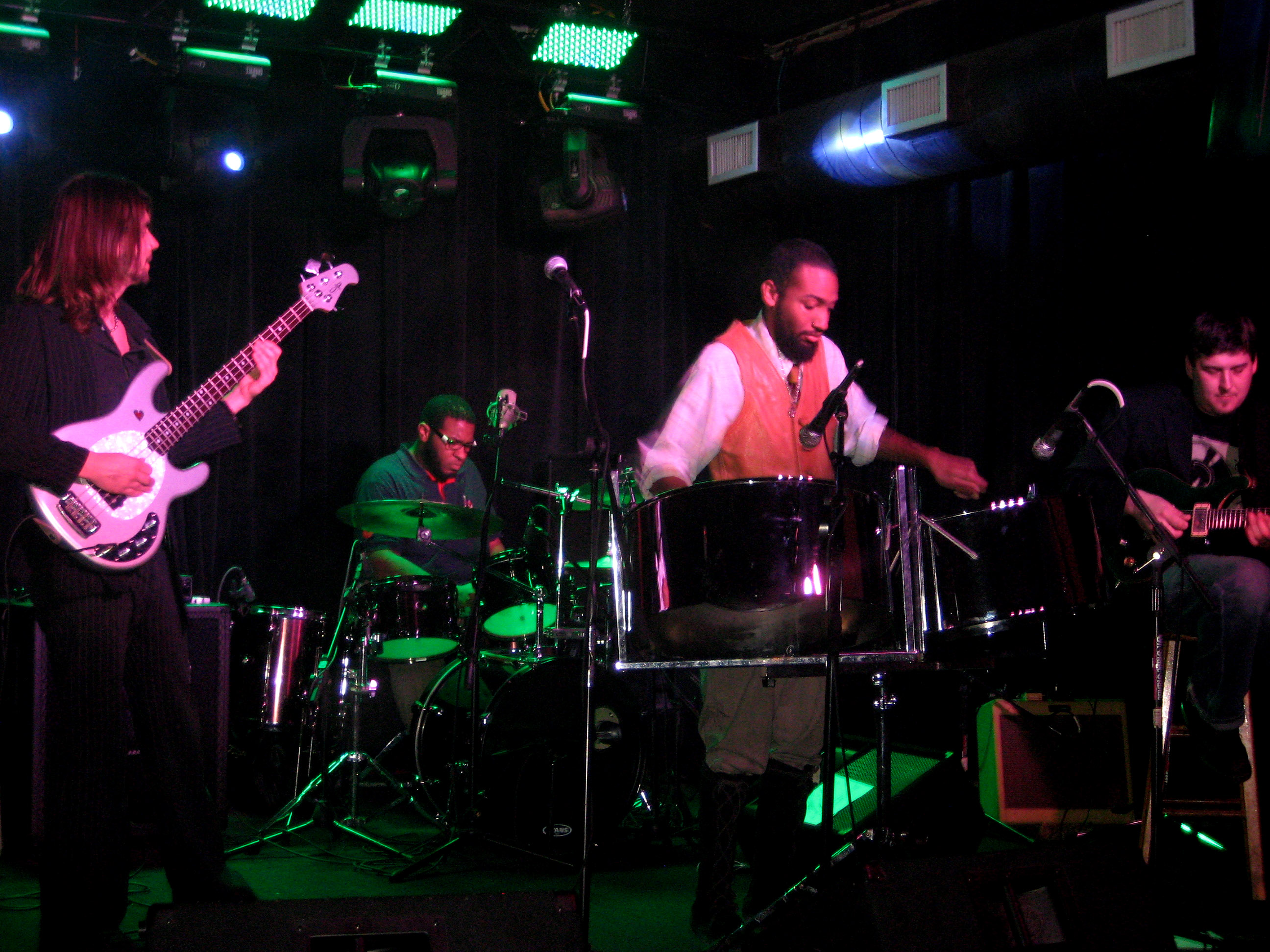
American pannist Jonathan Scales and his band performing in 2011

A pannist (sometimes panist or panman), is a person who plays the steelpan. A professional pannist may perform solo, play with a steel band, or accompany singers or solo instrumentalists.

Pannists may play with their respective bands in large competitions, and generally memorize everything that they perform.

The pannist's top position in a Panorama steelband is that of the captain. These large ensembles often include section leaders: accomplished pannists that monitor the various voices in the band.

Influential pannists include Ellie Mannette, the "Father of the Modern Steel Drum" and an accomplished panman, and Winston "Spree" Simon, the inventor and a skilled player of the "Ping Pong" pan.

=== Notable pannists ===
- Ellie Mannette
- Winston "Spree" Simon
- Ray Holman
- Liam Teague
- Len "Boogsie" Sharpe
- Russ Henderson
- Andy Akiho
- Othello Molineaux
- Jonathan Scales
- Yann Tomita
- Ralph MacDonald
- Robert Greenidge
- Andy Narell
- Tracy Thornton

== See also ==
- Hang (instrument) – a similar instrument with a convex rather than concave surface
- Handpan – a musical instruments created from Hang
