= Linda Baboolal =

Trinidad and Tobago politician and physician (1941–2019)

President of the Senate of Trinidad and Tobago
- In office 5 April 2002 – 17 December 2007
- Preceded by: Ganace Ramdial
- Succeeded by: Danny Montano

Personal details
- Born: 31 January 1941
- Died: 12 September 2019 (aged 78)

Linda Savitri Baboolal (31 January 1941 – 12 September 2019) was a Trinidad and Tobago politician and physician who served as the first female President of the Senate of Trinidad and Tobago (2002–2007). She was also Minister of Social Development and Minister of Health, and the first female chairperson of the People's National Movement (PNM).

== Early life and education ==
Linda Mohan was born in Siparia, Trinidad to parents Solomon and Sylvia Mohan. She was the eldest child of six — five girls and one boy.

== Career ==
Her childhood dream was to become a medical doctor - which she accomplished along with her husband, Michael Baboolal, in Dublin, Ireland. She interned at the Port of Spain General Hospital.

After their children were grown, she was approached by a new political party, National Alliance for Reconstruction (NAR), to be one of their candidates for election to government. She considered this at the time, but due to time constraints she declined.

She was actively involved in many charitable organizations - especially with the drug addiction rehabilitation center at Mount St. Benedict - which was the first of its kind in the country.

In 1991, she was again approached by the PNM to be a candidate in the general election and this time she accepted. She was the representative for the San Juan/Barataria constituency. She was appointed Minister of Social Services and then Minister of Health. At the following election, she lost her seat to the opposition but was then made the first female chairperson of the PNM.

She did not run for the next election but was still active in the party. She was President of the Senate - during which time she acted as President of Trinidad and Tobago on numerous occasions.

== Personal life ==
She was married to Michael Baboolal. She died in 2019.
