= Arnold Thomasos =

Trinidad and Tobago politician (1906–1990)

Clytus Arnold Thomasos

Speaker of the House of Representatives of Trinidad and Tobago
- In office 29 December 1961 – 27 November 1981
- Preceded by: Edgar Mortimer Duke
- Succeeded by: Matthew Ramcharan

Personal details
- Born: 23 July 1906 Arima
- Died: 20 December 1990 (aged 84)
- Party: People's National Movement
- Children: Gloria Thomasos-Pollard

Clytus Arnold Thomasos was a Trinidad and Tobago politician and the longest-serving Speaker of the House of Representatives.

Thomasos was born on 23 July 1906 in Arima. In the elections of 1956, he was People's National Movement's candidate for Arima constituency. He was elected as member of the Legislative Council of Trinidad and Tobago from 1956 to 1961. In October 1956 he was elected as deputy speaker of the Legislative Council.

Thomasos was elected Speaker of the House of Representatives on 29 December 1961. He served almost 20 years until November 1981, when he retired due to ill health.

He died on 20 December 1990.
