= Ellie Mannette =

Trinidadian musician and instrument maker (1927–2018)

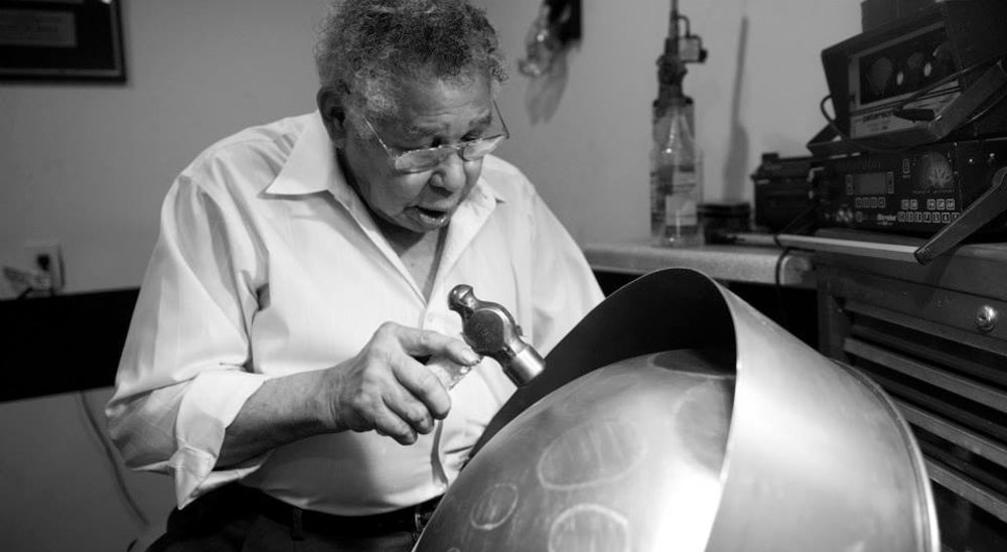
- Mannette creating a steel pan in 2016
- Born: Elliott Anthony Mannette; 5 November 1927; Sans Souci, Trinidad
- Died: 29 August 2018 (aged 90); Morgantown, West Virginia, U.S.
- Occupations: Steel pan musician and musical instrument maker
- Spouses: Jacqueline Patricia Mannette (married 1974); Joyce Kingston (deceased)
- Children: 10

Elliott Anthony "Ellie" Mannette^{[a]} (5 November 1927 – 29 August 2018) was a Trinidadian musical instrument maker and steel pan musician, also known as the "father of the modern steel drum".

== Life ==
Born in Sans Souci, Trinidad, Mannette as a young child developed a passion for metal and tools for metalworking, and would become engaged in the evolution of the phenomenon of sounding steel. At the age of 11, he was a member of Alexander's Ragtime Band created by Alexander Ford. From the middle of the 1930s, percussion bands of different quarters of Port-of-Spain were in competition with each other. Legend says that Mannette was the first person to use a discarded oil barrel to build a steel pan: "He sank the lid to create a tensed playing surface and fired the metal to improve the acoustic properties." From about 1939 to 1941, he performed with his own band, the Oval Boys (the name taken from the oval sports pavilion opposite the band's rehearsal space).

In 1948, Mannette was formally offered a scholarship to study music in London which he turned down in order to be able to build more steel pans.

In 1951, TASPO (Trinidad All Steel Percussion Orchestra) traveled to Great Britain to present the new musical instrument at the Festival of Britain. Mannette was a member and tuner for this orchestra, which consisted of leading figures of different Trinidadian steel bands.

After having visited the United States in the beginning of the 1960s to build up the US Navy Steel Band, he was invited to New York City to build instruments for an inner city youth program. This invitation had been carried out by Murray Narell, a New York social worker and father of Jeff and Andy Narell. At this time, Mannette tuned his instruments by ear. Eventually he learned about the necessity of concert pitch A440Hz and the use of strobe tuners.

Since 1967, Mannette had been building up several hundred steel bands all over the United States mainly in colleges and universities, but also for private institutions. In 1991, he was invited by West Virginia University to show interested students how to build and play steel pans. What was meant to be a guest-semester eventually turned into a longtime relationship called the University Tuning Project and later on the company Mannette Steel Drums.

“I always knew in my heart one day
that my work would find its way,
I could not tell you how,
there was no one there for me to show the way
but I figured it out.
I figured it all through for all of you to see today.”
~Ellie Manette

Mannette died on 29 August 2018, in Morgantown, West Virginia, United States, of kidney failure. He is survived by his second wife, Jacqueline Edwards, six children, four stepchildren, and many grand- and great-grandchildren.

== Merits ==
Mannette was credited with several innovations which have proven to be essential for the evolution of steel pan. He was the first to use a 55-gallon oil barrel instead of biscuit tins or soap boxes. Furthermore, Mannette was the person to sink the top of the drum into a concave shape, thus having more space to place notes as well as achieving a better isolation between the different pitches. Mannette has developed many instruments of the steel pan family. His use of the whole tone scale on two resonance bodies has become a widely common standard.

Mannette developed his own skills and style over many years. Within the University Tuning Project at West Virginia University in Morgantown, West Virginia, US, he passed on his knowledge of pan building and tuning to many students. His works can be seen in many museums and galleries including the Smithsonian Institution, the Metropolitan Museum of Art, and the Contemporary Art Gallery in New York.

== Awards ==
In 1969, Mannette was awarded the Hummingbird Medal (Silver) of Trinidad and Tobago for his innovations in pan making. For more than 30 years, he was at the forefront of the steelband movement in the United States; in recognition of his contributions to the art form, he received a 1999 National Heritage Fellowship from the National Endowment for the Arts, which is the United States government's highest honor in the folk and traditional arts. In November 2000, he was awarded an Honorary Doctorate from the University of the West Indies and returned home to Trinidad, after a 33-year absence, to accept it. The same year he also received the Chaconia Medal Silver from his home country, for outstanding cultural achievement.

In 2003, Mannette was admitted to the Hall of Fame of the Percussive Arts Society of the United States, when he was quoted as saying: "Looking back more than half a century during my humble beginnings in this unique art form, no one during that period could have envisioned the rapid growth of this instrument. Through the years as I developed my skills, my entire mindset was sharing my knowledge with others for the betterment of this instrument."

== See also ==
- Steelpan
- Electronic tuner
