= List of speakers of the House of Representatives of Trinidad and Tobago =

Speaker of the House of Representatives of Trinidad and Tobago

- Flag of Trinidad and Tobago

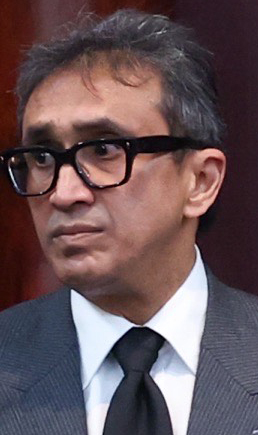
- Incumbent; Jagdeo Singh since 23 May 2025
- Style: The Honourable (formal); Mister Speaker (informal)
- Appointer: Members of the House of Representatives
- Term length: During the life of the House of Representatives of Trinidad and Tobago (five years maximum)
- Inaugural holder: John L.H.V. Savary; Legislative Assembly (1950–1955); Arnold Thomasos; Independent Parliament (1961–1981)
- Formation: 20 October 1950
- Deputy: Deputy Speaker of the House of Representatives
- Salary: TT$29,590 (per month) (Speaker); TT$18,280 (per month) (Deputy Speaker)
- Website: ttparliament.org

List of Speakers of the House of Representatives of Trinidad and Tobago.

== List ==
=== Legislative Assembly ===
Below is a list of speakers of the Legislative Assembly 1950–1961:

Name	Term served	Elected	Legislative Council
John L.H.V. Savary	1950–1955	October 20, 1950	8th
Ashford Sinanan	1955–1956	March 1955	8th
Edgar Mortimer Duke	1956–1961	October 28, 1956	9th

=== House of Representatives ===
Below is a list of speakers of the House of Representatives of Trinidad and Tobago:

Name	Term served	Elected	Independent Parliament
Arnold Thomasos	1961–1981	December 29, 1961	1st Independent Parliament
Arnold Thomasos	1961–1981		2nd Independent Parliament
Arnold Thomasos	1961–1981		3rd Independent Parliament
Arnold Thomasos	1961–1981		1st Republican Parliament
Matthew Ramcharan	1981–1986	November 27, 1981	2nd Republican Parliament
Nizam Mohammed	1986–1991	January 12, 1987	3rd Republican Parliament
Occah Seapaul	1992–1995	January 13, 1992	4th Republican Parliament
Hector McClean	1995–2000	November 27, 1995	5th Republican Parliament
Rupert Griffith	2001–2002	January 12, 2001	6th Republican Parliament
Barendra Sinanan	2002–2010	October 17, 2002	8th Republican Parliament
Barendra Sinanan	2002–2010	December 17, 2007	9th Republican Parliament
Wade Mark	2010–2015	June 18, 2010	10th Republican Parliament
Bridgid Annisette-George	2015–2025	September 23, 2015	11th Republican Parliament
Bridgid Annisette-George	2015–2025	August 28, 2020	12th Republican Parliament
Jagdeo Singh	2025–present	May 23, 2025	13th Republican Parliament

== Sources ==
- Official website of the Parliament of Trinidad and Tobago
