= President of the Senate of Trinidad and Tobago =

- Flag of Trinidad and Tobago

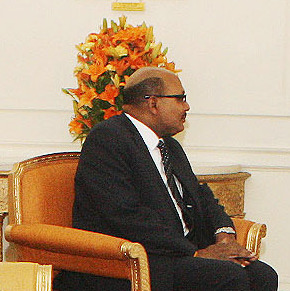
- Incumbent; Wade Mark since 23 May 2025
- Style: The Honourable (formal); Mr. President (informal)
- Appointer: Members of the Senate
- Term length: During the life of the Senate of Trinidad and Tobago (five years maximum)
- Inaugural holder: J. Hamilton Maurice (1961-1971)
- Formation: 29 December 1961
- Deputy: Vice President of the Senate
- Salary: TT$29,590 (per month) (President); TT$18,280 (per month) (Vice President)
- Website: ttparliament.org

The president of the Senate of Trinidad and Tobago is generally elected from the government benches. The president chairs debates in the chamber of the Senate of Trinidad and Tobago and stands in for the country's president during periods of absence or illness (Constitution of Trinidad and Tobago, section 27). A vice-president of the Senate is also elected from among the senators. The current president of the Senate is Senator Wade Mark.

== Presidents of the Senate ==
President	Served	Elected	Notes
J. Hamilton Maurice	1961 – 1971	29 December 1961	
Wahid Ali	1971 – 1986	18 June 1971	
Michael Williams	1987 – 1990	12 January 1987	
Emmanuel Carter	1990 – 1995	12 March 1990	
Ganace Ramdial	1995 – 2002	27 November 1995	
Linda Baboolal	2002 – 2007	5 April 2002	
Danny Montano	2007 – 2010	17 December 2007	
Timothy Hamel-Smith	2010 – 2015	18 June 2010	
Raziah Ahmed	2015	3 February 2015	
Christine Kangaloo	2015 – 2023	23 September 2015	
Nigel de Freitas	2023 – 2025	18 January 2023	
Wade Mark	2025 –	23 May 2025	

== Vice-presidents of the Senate ==
Vice-President	Served	Appointed	Notes
Lancelot Beckles	1961 – 1970	29 December 1961	
A. Date Camps	1970 – 1971	21 May 1970	
Canute E. Spencer	1971 – 1976	18 June 1971	
J. Hamilton-Holder	1976 – 1981	24 September 1976	
Emru Millette	1981 – 1986	27 November 1981	
Carlyle Walters	1987 – 1988	12 January 1987	
Leonard Bradshaw	1988 – 1991	12 April 1988	
Ainsley Mark	1992 – 1995	13 January 1992	
Philip Hamel-Smith	1995 – 2000	27 November 1995	
Wade Mark	2001	12 January 2001	
Christine Kangaloo	2002	5 April 2002	
Rawle Titus	2002 – 2007	17 October 2002	
George Hadeed	2007 – 2010	17 December 2007	
Lyndira Oudit	2010 – 2013	18 June 2010	
James Lambert	2013 – 2015	10 September 2013	
Nigel De Freitas	2015 – 2022	23 September 2015	
Muhammad Yunus Ibrahim	2022 – 2025	22 March 2022	
Kenya Charles	2025 –	23 May 2025	
