= Tamboo bamboo =

Type of idiophone

Tamboo bamboo is a Trinidadian percussion instrument (idiophone) created in Trinidad BWI, and is a notable precursor to the creation of steelpan. Its name derives from the French word for drum (tambour) and the material from which the instrument is predominantly made from. It is still played by carnival-goers in Trinidad today, although it was the dominant instrument at carnival at the turn of the twentieth century.
