= House of Representatives (Trinidad and Tobago) =

Lower house of the Parliament of Trinidad and Tobago

Coordinates: 10°39′12″N 61°30′42″W

House of Representatives of Trinidad and Tobago
- 13th Republican Parliament of Trinidad and Tobago
- Flag Coat of Arms

Type
- Type: Lower house of the Parliament of Trinidad and Tobago

Leadership
- Speaker: Jagdeo Singh (Note: Singh was elected Speaker of the House of Representatives under the nomination of the UNC. However, the position of Speaker of the House of Representatives is officially one without political affiliation.) since 23 May 2025
- Deputy Speaker: Aiyna Ali, UNC since 23 May 2025
- Prime Minister: Kamla Persad-Bissessar, UNC since 1 May 2025
- Leader of Government Business: Barry Padarath, UNC since 23 May 2025
- Leader of the Opposition: Pennelope Beckles-Robinson, PNM since 6 May 2025
- Opposition Chief Whip: Marvin Gonzales, PNM since 23 May 2025

Structure
- Seats: 41; 21 or (20 plus the Speaker of the House of Representatives) for a majority
- Political groups: Government (26): United National Congress–Coalition of Interests (26); Official Opposition (13): People's National Movement (13); Other Opposition (2): Tobago People's Party (2)

Elections
- Voting system: First-past-the-post
- Last election: 28 April 2025

Meeting place
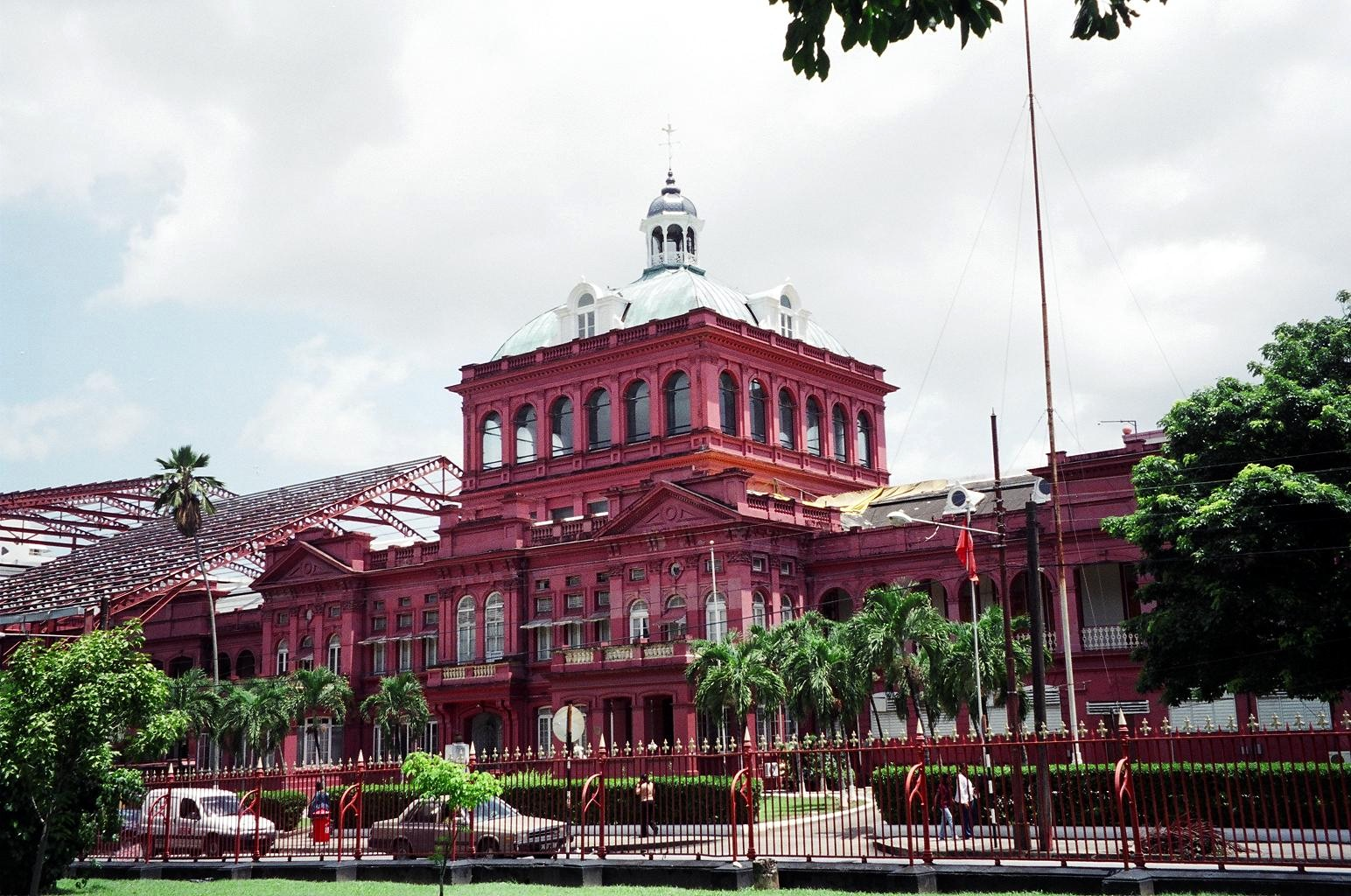
- The Red House, Abercromby Street, Downtown, Port of Spain, Trinidad and Tobago

Website
- www.ttparliament.org

Constitution
- Constitution of Trinidad and Tobago

The House of Representatives is the elected lower house of the bicameral Parliament of Trinidad and Tobago, along with the President and Senate of Trinidad and Tobago. The House of Representatives sits at the Red House. It has 41 members, each elected to represent single-seat constituencies. The Parliament is elected with a five-year term, but may be dissolved earlier by the President if so advised by the Prime Minister.

After an election, the person commanding the support of the most members of the House is appointed Prime Minister and asked to form a government.

Five constituencies were added in the 2007 election; there were 36 constituencies prior to 2007. There are now 41 constituencies.

The Presiding Officer of the House of Representatives is the Speaker of the House, who can either be one of the elected 41 members, or come from outside. This has implications for the calculation of special majority votes (42 members instead of 41).

As of 20 April 2021, there are only 12 female members (28.6%), and three members born in Tobago (7.3%).

== 2025 Election ==
Party	Seats	+/–
United National Congress	26	+7
People's National Movement	13	–9
Tobago People's Party	2	New
Patriotic Front	0	New
Congress of the People	0	0
National Transformation Alliance	0	New
Progressive Empowerment Party	0	0
New National Vision	0	0
All People's Party	0	New
Trinidad Humanity Campaign	0	0
National Coalition for Transformation	0	New
Movement for National Development	0	0
The Hyarima Movement	0	New
Progressive Democratic Patriots	0	0
Innovative Democratic Alliance	0	New
Class Action Reform Movement	0	New
Unity of the People	0	New
Independents	0	0
Total	41	0
Source: Elections and Boundaries Commission (preliminary results)

== Current members of Parliament ==
=== Speaker of the House of Representatives ===
Name	Image	Party Appointed by	Since
The Honourable Jagdeo Singh		Independent	23 May 2025

== See also ==
- Parliament of Trinidad and Tobago
- Senate of Trinidad and Tobago
- Elections in Trinidad and Tobago
- List of political parties in Trinidad and Tobago
- List of speakers of the House of Representatives of Trinidad and Tobago
- Politics of Trinidad and Tobago
- List of Trinidad and Tobago MPs
