= 2026 Tobago House of Assembly election =

Legislative election

- 12 January 2026

15 seats in the Tobago House of Assembly 8 seats needed for a majority
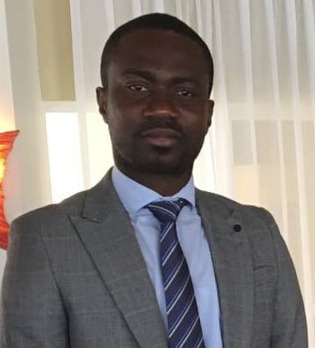

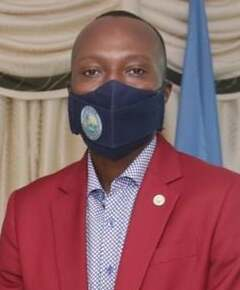
	First party	Second party
Leader	Farley Chavez Augustine	Ancil Dennis
Party	TPP	PNM
Leader since	2023	2022
Last election	New	40.9%, 1 seat
Seats won	15	0
Seat change	▲15	▼1
Popular vote	16,239	10,459
Percentage	60.4%	38.9%
Swing	New	▼2.0%
Chief Secretary before election
Farley Chavez Augustine
Tobago People's Party
Chief Secretary after election
Farley Chavez Augustine
Tobago People's Party

An election for the Tobago House of Assembly (THA) was held in Tobago on 12 January 2026. The election saw the ruling Tobago People's Party (TPP) win a landslide victory, winning all 15 seats.

== Background ==
In the previous December 2021 election, the Progressive Democratic Patriots (PDP) won a landslide victory, winning 14 out of 15 seats, with the PDP's Farley Chavez Augustine becoming Chief Secretary of Tobago. In December 2022, 13 PDP MPs and several councillors (appointed members of the THA) left the party and continued to form government as a collective of independents under Augustine’s leadership. In August 2023, the governing independent MPs formed the Tobago People's Party.

== Election preparation ==
In June 2025, the Tobago Council of the People's National Movement (PNM) announced that they had initiated a process for selecting candidates for the next THA election. By August 2025, the PNM had selected all 15 candidates for the election.

In October 2025, the PDP revealed they had already initiated the process of screening candidates. In the same month, the ruling party of Tobago, the TPP, announced a timeline for candidate applications, with applications opening on 7 October and closing on 17 October. In late October, following the close of nominations, TPP revealed 55 people had applied to be candidates.

On 10 November 2025, the Elections and Boundaries Commission announced it was in a state of readiness for an election being called.

On 12 November, following a request by the Chief Secretary, the THA was dissolved, and a new election was required. However, an election date was not initially announced, although the election was required to be held between 12 January and 12 February 2026 according to the requirements set out in section 22 of the THA Act 40 from 1996. On 1 December 2025, the election date was announced as 12 January 2026. On 8 December 2025, PDP party leader Watson Duke announced that the PDP would not contest the election and made statements seen as showing support for the TPP, however he did not make an outright endorsement.

== Campaign ==
Following the close of nominations for the election in December 2025, the Election and Boundaries Commission confirmed there were 15 candidates from the TPP, 15 from the PNM, 11 from the IDA, and 1 from Unity of the People, meaning a total of 42 candidates contesting the 15 THA electoral districts.

In late December 2025, Watson Duke, Leader of the PDP, formally endorsed the TPP and encouraged PDP supporters to back the TPP in order to prevent a PNM government.

== Results ==
The election saw the TPP win all 15 electoral districts, with the PNM losing its only seat.

Party	Votes	%	Seats	+/–
Tobago People's Party	16,239	60.40	15	New
Tobago Council of the People's National Movement	10,459	38.90	0	–1
Innovative Democratic Alliance	180	0.67	0	0
Unity of the People	8	0.03	0	0
Total	26,886	100.00	15	0
Valid votes	26,886	99.61		
Invalid/blank votes	105	0.39		
Total votes	26,991	100.00		
Registered voters/turnout	53,239	50.70		
Source: Elections and Boundaries Commission

== Aftermath ==
Following the election defeat for the PNM, including their sole THA representative, Kelvon Morris losing his seat, party leader Ancil Dennis indicated he would be resigning as leader.
