= Tobago People's Party =

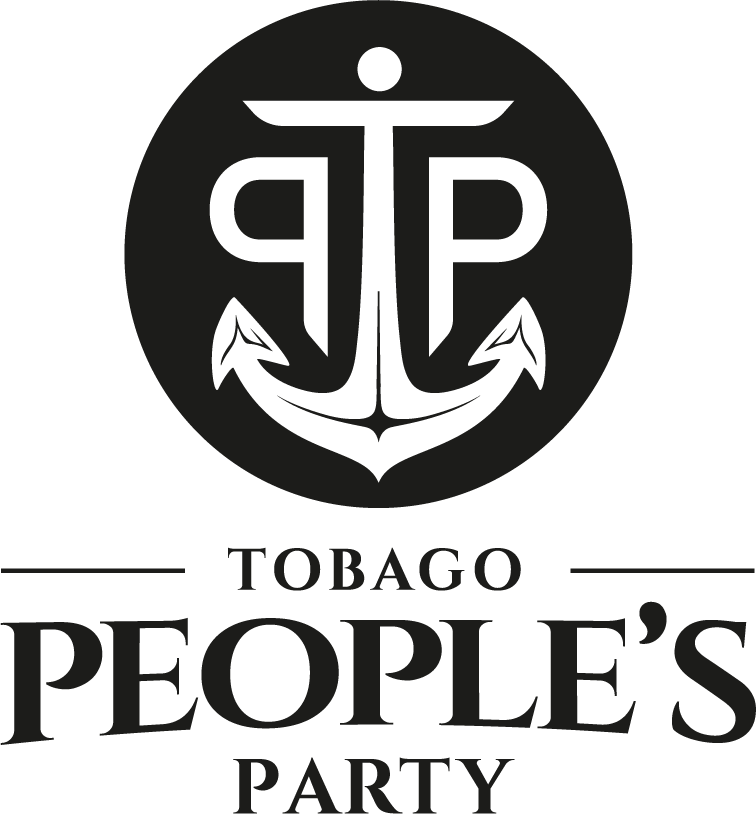
- Abbreviation: TPP
- Leader: Farley Chavez Augustine
- Founder: Farley Chavez Augustine
- Founded: August 12, 2023
- Split from: Progressive Democratic Patriots
- Ideology: Tobago autonomism Tobago self-determination
- Colors: Blue
- Senate: 0 / 31
- House of Representatives: 2 / 41
- Tobago House of Assembly: 15 / 15

Website
- tpptobago.org

The Tobago People's Party (TPP) is a political party in Trinidad and Tobago. It was founded in August 2023 by the Chief Secretary of Tobago Farley Chavez Augustine and is currently the governing party in the Tobago House of Assembly (THA).

== History ==
The party was formed from 13 Tobago House of Assembly members who had been elected as part of the Progressive Democratic Patriots in the December 2021 snap election. In 2022 they resigned from the PDP leaving the party leader, Watson Duke, as the sole PDP member of the Tobago House of Assembly.

The party won both Tobago seats in the 2025 Trinidad and Tobago general election taking both seats from the People's National Movement. This also marks the first time since 2013 that three political parties are represented Parliament.

In the 2026 Tobago House of Assembly election, the TPP won a landslide victory, winning all 15 electoral districts.

== Election results ==
=== House of Representatives ===
Election	Party leader	Votes			Seats		Position	Government
Election	Party leader	No.	%	+/–	No.	+/–	Position	Government
2025	Farley Chavez Augustine	13,857	2.23	New	2 / 41	▲2	3rd	Coalition of Interests

=== Tobago House of Assembly ===
Election	Party leader	Votes			Seats		Government	Ref?
Election	Party leader	No.	%	+/–	No.	+/–	Government	Ref?
2026 (Note: 2026 THA election preliminary results from the Elections and Boundaries Commission)	Farley Chavez Augustine	16,240	60.4	New	15 / 15	▲15	Government	
