= Innovative Democratic Alliance =

- Abbreviation: IDA
- Leader: Denise Tsoiafatt Angus
- Founded: August 2021
- Colors: Purple
- Senate: 0 / 31
- House of Representatives: 0 / 41
- Tobago House of Assembly: 0 / 15

Website
- www.ida-tt.com

The Innovative Democratic Alliance (IDA) is a minor political party in Tobago. It does not hold any representation in the House of Representatives or the Tobago House of Assembly.

== History ==
The IDA was launched in August 2021 by Denise Tsoiafatt Angus. The IDA initially announced 12 candidates for the December 2021 Tobago House of Assembly election, and ultimately put forward 13 candidates for the election, receiving 295 votes (or 1.01% of the vote share) and failing to win any seats. The party ran candidates in both of Tobago's House of Representatives constituencies for the 2025 Trinidad and Tobago general election, however won 143 votes (0.02%), with both candidates being unsuccessful.

In November 2025, the party confirmed it would contest the next Tobago House of Assembly election. The IDA stood 11 candidates in the 2026 Tobago House of Assembly election, with preliminary results showing the party received 181 votes (0.67%) and won no seats.

== Election results ==
=== House of Representatives ===
| Election | Party leader | Tobago | | | +/– | Government |
| Election | Party leader | Votes | % | Seats | +/– | Government |
|---|---|---|---|---|---|---|
| 2025 | Denise Tsoiafatt Angus | 143 | 0.02 | 0 / 2 | New | Extra-parliamentary |

=== Tobago House of Assembly ===
| Election year | Party leader | Votes | % | Seats | +/– | Government |
|---|---|---|---|---|---|---|
| Dec 2021 | Denise Tsoiafatt Angus | 295 | 1.01 (#3) | 0 / 15 | New | Extra-parliamentary |
| 2026 (Note: 2026 THA election preliminary results from the Elections and Boundaries Commission) | Denise Tsoiafatt Angus | 181 | 0.67 (#3) | 0 / 15 | Steady | Extra-parliamentary |

== Leadership ==
The party is led by Denise Tsoiafatt Angus, who was formerly the Presiding Officer of the Tobago House of Assembly.
