= Winston Duke =

Tobagonian actor (born 1986)

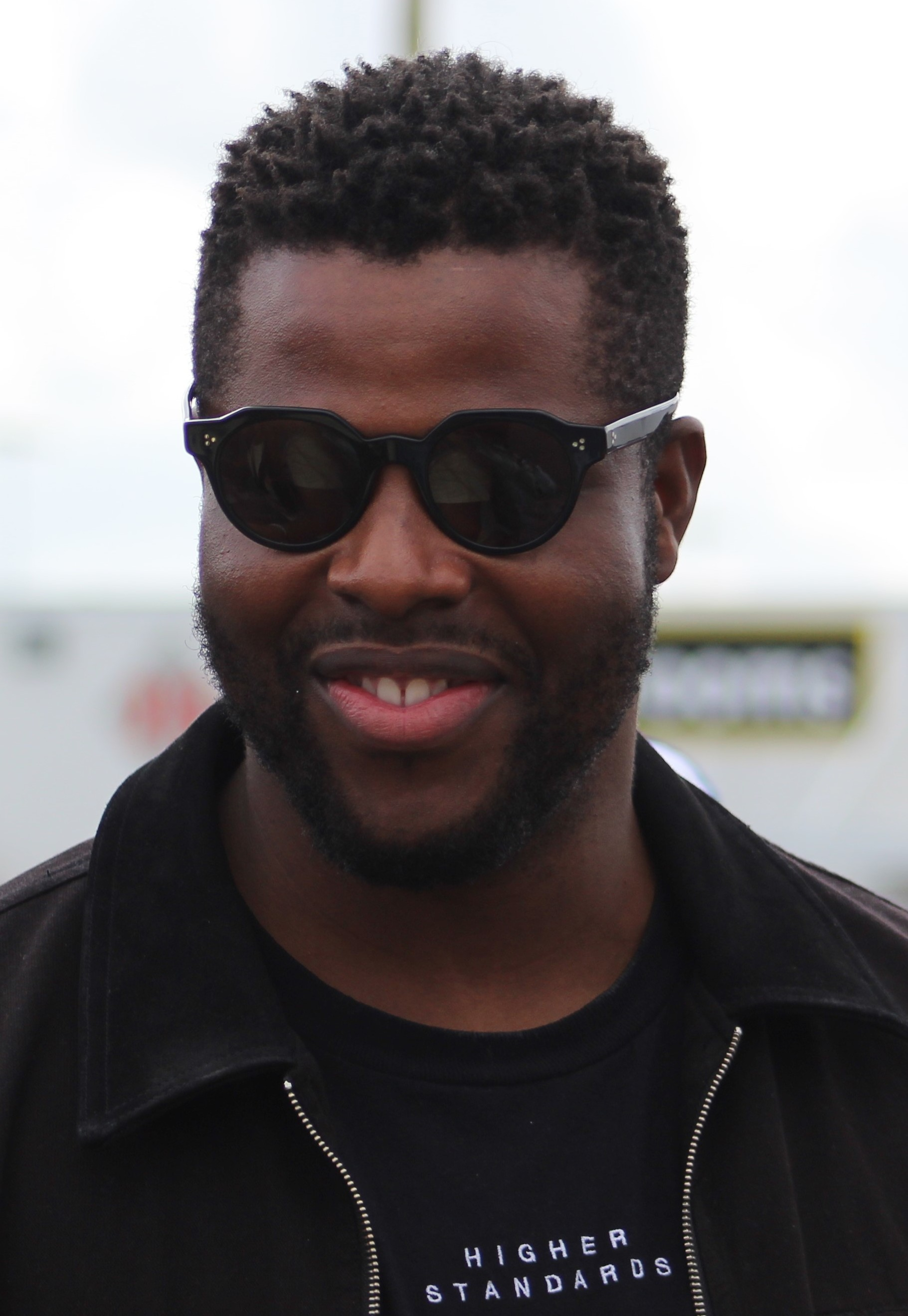
- Duke in 2020
- Born: 15 November 1986 (age 39); Argyle, Tobago, Trinidad and Tobago
- Citizenship: Trinidad and Tobago; United States; Rwanda (since 2023)
- Education: University at Buffalo (BA); Yale University (MFA)
- Occupation: Actor
- Years active: 2014–present
- Relatives: Watson Duke (cousin)

Winston Duke (born 15 November 1986) is a Trinidadian and Tobagonian actor. Duke was born in Tobago and moved to Brooklyn, New York, United States, at age nine.

Duke began his career with minor roles in theatre productions and recurring roles on the CBS science fiction series Person of Interest (2014–2015) and the ABC sitcom Modern Family (2016). He rose to prominence after playing M'Baku in several films of the Marvel Cinematic Universe, which is one of the highest-grossing media franchises. He has since taken roles in the horror film Us (2019), the fantasy drama film Nine Days (2020), and the action comedy films Spenser Confidential (2020) and The Fall Guy (2024).

== Early life, family and education ==
Winston Duke was born in the village of Argyle, Tobago in the country of Trinidad and Tobago on 15 November 1986. He was raised by Cora Pantin, a single mother who was a Tobagonian government worker and restaurant owner. He does not have a relationship with his father. He has an older sister, Cindy. His cousin is the Tobagonian politician and Progressive Democratic Patriots leader Watson Duke.

As a child, Duke worked at his mother's restaurant, seating customers at their tables and learned how to "charm" strangers at an early age. When he was nine years old, his mother decided to move her family to the US. She sold the restaurant and their possessions. The three of them settled in a studio apartment in Brooklyn, New York City, where Cindy could attend medical school.

Duke attended a public primary school in Crown Heights, and often frequented the local library and comic book store after school. He graduated from Brighton High School in Rochester, New York in 2004. He attended the University at Buffalo, earning a Bachelor of Arts in theatre. He subsequently earned a Master of Fine Arts in acting at Yale School of Drama, graduating in 2013. His mother died in 2022 at age 66.

== Career ==
Duke started acting in theatre productions for Portland Stage Company and Yale Repertory Theatre before being cast in Person of Interest. In 2012 Duke returned to his native Trinidad and Tobago to appear in the theatre production of An Echo in the Bone starring alongside actress Taromi Lourdes Joseph and directed by fellow Yale alumna Timmia Hearn Feldman.

He was cast in a few roles in television series, such as a football star who is a victim of a prank and in turn commits a hate crime in Law & Order: Special Victims Unit, a gang leader in Person of Interest and a football player in Modern Family.

In September 2016, Duke was cast in the role of M'Baku in Black Panther after Marvel tested several actors for the role, including Yahya Abdul-Mateen II. It was released in 2018. Wesley Morris of The New York Times named his performance in Black Panther as one of the best in 2018, describing him as "funny, shameless [and] imposing". He reprised the role in Avengers: Infinity War (2018) and Avengers: Endgame (2019), which are among the highest-grossing films ever made.

In 2019, Duke starred in the hit horror film Us, directed by Jordan Peele. In October 2019, Duke signed on to headline in the Apple TV+ drama series Swagger, but due to an injury suffered on-set in February 2020, he was replaced by O'Shea Jackson Jr. In September, Duke was named Actor of the Year by GQ Australia. He starred in Nine Days (2020), directed by Edson Oda, as a manager who interviews unborn souls and selects them to live on Earth. In March 2020, he starred alongside Mark Wahlberg in the Netflix thriller Spenser Confidential.

On 24 October 2021, Duke received the Maverick Award at the Newport Beach Film Festival. It was reported in July 2021 that Duke would be playing Bruce Wayne/Batman in the Spotify podcast audio drama Batman Unburied, which was released in 2022. Although Duke worried that backlash from fans about a Black actor playing Wayne would surface, his role was instead met with support and intrigue. Duke reprised his role as M'Baku in Black Panther: Wakanda Forever (2022), and the upcoming Avengers: Doomsday (2026) and Black Panther III (2028). He has appeared in a Savage X Fenty fashion show.

== Personal life ==
Duke is friends with actress Lupita Nyong'o, whom he met while attending Yale and went on to co-star with in several films. According to Esquire magazine, he is an "art fanatic".

In September 2023, Duke became a naturalized citizen of Rwanda.

== Filmography ==
=== Film ===
Key
†	Denotes films that have not yet been released

Year	Title	Role	Notes	Ref.
2018	Black Panther	M'Baku		
2018	Avengers: Infinity War	M'Baku		
2019	Us	Gabriel "Gabe" Wilson / Abraham		
2019	Avengers: Endgame	M'Baku		
2020	Nine Days	Will	Also executive producer	
2020	Spenser Confidential	Hawk		
2022	Black Panther: Wakanda Forever	M'Baku		
2024	The Fall Guy	Dan Tucker		
2026	Avengers: Doomsday †	M'Baku	Post-production	
TBA	Slime †	TBA (voice)	In production	
TBA	Jabari's People †	TBA	Post-production	

=== Television ===
Year	Title	Role	Notes	Ref.
2014	Law & Order: Special Victims Unit	Cedric Jones	Episode: "Gridiron Soldier"	
2014–2015	Person of Interest	Dominic Besson / Mini	Recurring role; 7 episodes	
2015	The Messengers	Zahir Zakaria	Recurring role; 3 episodes	
2015	Major Crimes	Curtis Turner	Episode: "#FindKaylaWeber"	
2016	Modern Family	Dwight	Recurring role; 3 episodes	
2026	Invincible	Space Racer (voice)	Recurring role	

=== Podcast ===
Year	Title	Role	Notes
2022	Batman Unburied	Bruce Wayne	Season One

== Awards and nominations ==
Awards and nominations received by Winston Duke
Award	Year (Note: Indicates the year of ceremony. Each year is linked to the article about the awards held that year, wherever possible.)	Category	Nominated work	Result	Ref.
AARP Movies for Grownups Awards	2019	Best Ensemble	Black Panther	Nominated	
Austin Film Critics Association Awards	2018	Best Ensemble	Black Panther	Nominated	
Black Reel Awards	2019	Outstanding Breakthrough Performance, Male	Black Panther	Won	
Black Reel Awards	2019	Outstanding Ensemble	Black Panther	Won	
Black Reel Awards	2022	Outstanding Actor	Nine Days	Nominated	
Black Reel Awards	2023	Outstanding Ensemble	Black Panther: Wakanda Forever	Nominated	
Critics' Choice Awards	2019	Best Acting Ensemble	Black Panther	Nominated	
Denver International Film Festival	2020	Excellence in Acting	Nine Days	Won	
Fangoria Chainsaw Awards	2020	Best Actor	Us	Nominated	
Georgia Film Critics Association	2019	Best Ensemble	Black Panther	Nominated	
MTV Movie & TV Awards	2018	Best Fight (Note: Shared with Chadwick Boseman.)	Black Panther	Nominated	
MTV Movie & TV Awards	2023	Best Kick-ass Cast	Black Panther: Wakanda Forever	Nominated	
NAACP Image Awards	2019	Outstanding Breakthrough Performance in a Motion Picture	Black Panther	Nominated	
NAACP Image Awards	2019	Outstanding Ensemble Cast in a Motion Picture	Black Panther	Won	
NAACP Image Awards	2019	Outstanding Supporting Actor in a Motion Picture	Black Panther	Nominated	
NAACP Image Awards	2020	Outstanding Actor in a Motion Picture	Us	Nominated	
NAACP Image Awards	2023	Outstanding Ensemble Cast in a Motion Picture	Black Panther: Wakanda Forever	Won	
Newport Beach Film Festival Awards	2021	Maverick Award	Nine Days	Won	
Online Film & Television Association Awards	2019	Best Ensemble	Black Panther	Nominated	
Screen Actors Guild Awards	2019	Outstanding Performance by a Cast in a Motion Picture	Black Panther	Won	
Seattle Film Critics Society Awards	2018	Best Ensemble	Black Panther	Nominated	
Washington D.C. Area Film Critics Association Awards	2018	Best Ensemble	Black Panther	Nominated	
