= Farley Chavez Augustine =

Tobagonian educator and politician (born 1985)

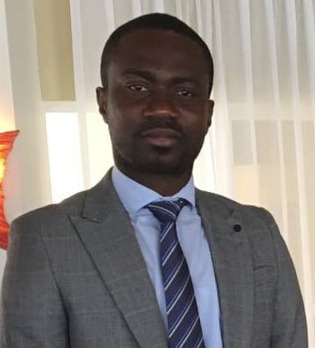
- Augustine in 2017

Chief Secretary of Tobago
- Incumbent
- Assumed office 8 December 2021
- Preceded by: Ancil Dennis

Personal details
- Born: 1985 (age 40–41) Speyside, Tobago, Trinidad and Tobago
- Party: Tobago People's Party
- Other political affiliations: Progressive Democratic Patriots (until 2023)

Farley Chavez Augustine (born 1985) is a Tobagonian politician and educator serving as the current Chief Secretary of Tobago, the island's head of government. He holds the additional executive role of secretary for finance, trade and the economy.

== Early life ==
Augustine was raised in Speyside. He attended the University of the West Indies before returning to Tobago to become a high school teacher.

== Political career ==
In the December 2021 Tobago House of Assembly election, the Progressive Democratic Patriots (PDP) party, which had declared Augustine to be its candidate for Chief Secretary, won a majority in the Tobago House of Assembly (THA). Augustine was thus named the Chief Secretary in 2021. In 2023, after a conflict with the PDP's leader, he formed his own party, the Tobago People's Party, to which most members of the THA defected.

In 2024, the opposition Tobago Council of the People's National Movement accused Augustine of accepting bribes. Augustine denied these charges.

== Personal life ==
Augustine is a member of the Seventh-day Adventist Church.
