= Watson Duke =

Tobagonian politician (born 1965))

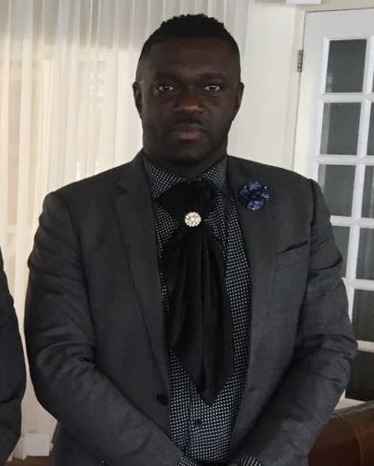
Duke in 2017

Watson Duke (born 1965) is a Tobagonian politician and trade unionist. He is the current president of the Progressive Democratic Patriots, a political party in Trinidad and Tobago.

Duke was born in Tobago and educated at the Scarborough Secondary School. He later attended the University of the West Indies, where he received a bachelor's degree in Industrial Relations. After graduation, Duke worked as a teacher and later as a trade unionist, serving as the President of the Tobago branch of the Public Services Association (PSA) from 2001 to 2015. His cousin is actor Winston Duke, famed for his role in Black Panther.

In 2013, Duke founded the Tobago Organization of the People (TOP) and was elected as its leader. The TOP is a progressive political party that advocates for greater autonomy for Tobago as well as regional issues. In the 2015 Tobago House of Assembly elections, Duke was elected as a member of the Assembly, representing the electoral district of Tobago East. He was re-elected in the 2020 Tobago House of Assembly elections and currently serves as the Leader of the Opposition in the Assembly.

Duke has been a critic of the government's handling of the COVID-19 pandemic and has called for greater transparency and accountability in the management of public funds. In addition to his political career, Duke is also a businessman and owns several companies in Tobago. He is married and has three children.

Watson Duke and the Tobago Organization of the People (TOP) have been advocates for greater autonomy for Tobago and have aspirations for independence from Trinidad and Tobago. Duke has argued that Tobago, as a separate island with its own distinct culture and economy, should have more control over its own affairs and should not be dependent on the decisions of the government in Trinidad. TOP has called for a referendum on Tobago's political status, arguing that the island should have the right to determine its own future. Duke and the TOP believe that independence for Tobago would allow the island to fully realize its potential and to pursue its own development goals without interference from Trinidad.
