= Laurel Lezama-Lee Sing =

Trinidad and Tobago politician

The Honourable Laurel Lezama-Lee Sing

Member of the Senate
- In office 28 August 2020 – 25 September 2024

Personal details
- Party: People's National Movement (PNM)

Laurel Lezama-Lee Sing (née Lezama) is a Trinidad and Tobago politician from the People's National Movement (PNM).

== Career ==
In the 2010 Trinidad and Tobago general election, she was the PNM candidate in Arima. In September 2024, she resigned from the Senate and was replaced by Ancil Dennis. This was after a lawsuit was filed by her husband Daren Lee Sing. Lezama-Lee Sing remains as education officer for the PNM.

== Personal life ==
She and her husband have three daughters. They separated in 2024.
