= Speyside, Trinidad and Tobago =

Village in northern Tobago

Coordinates: 11°18′N 60°32′W

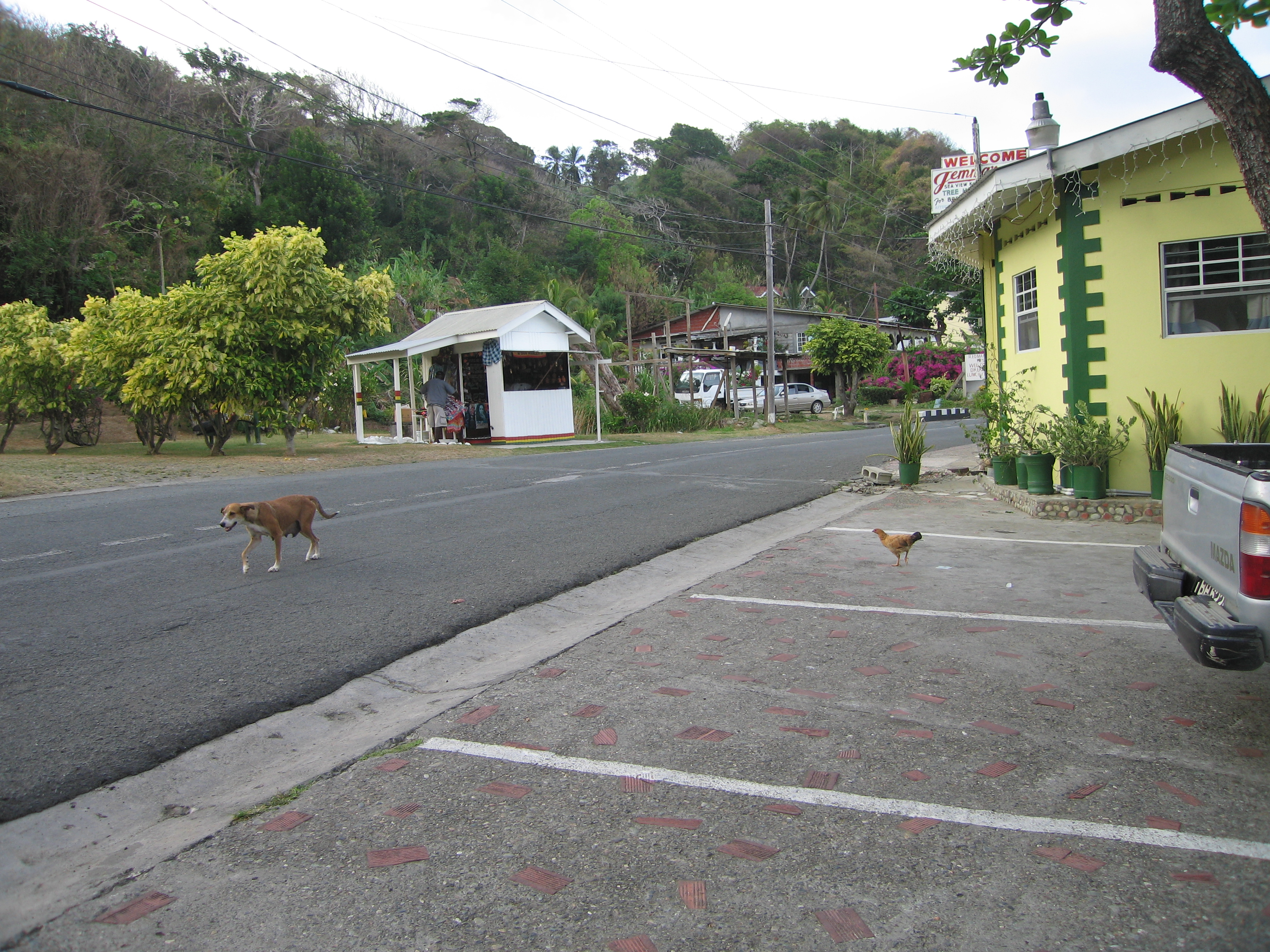
View of the town

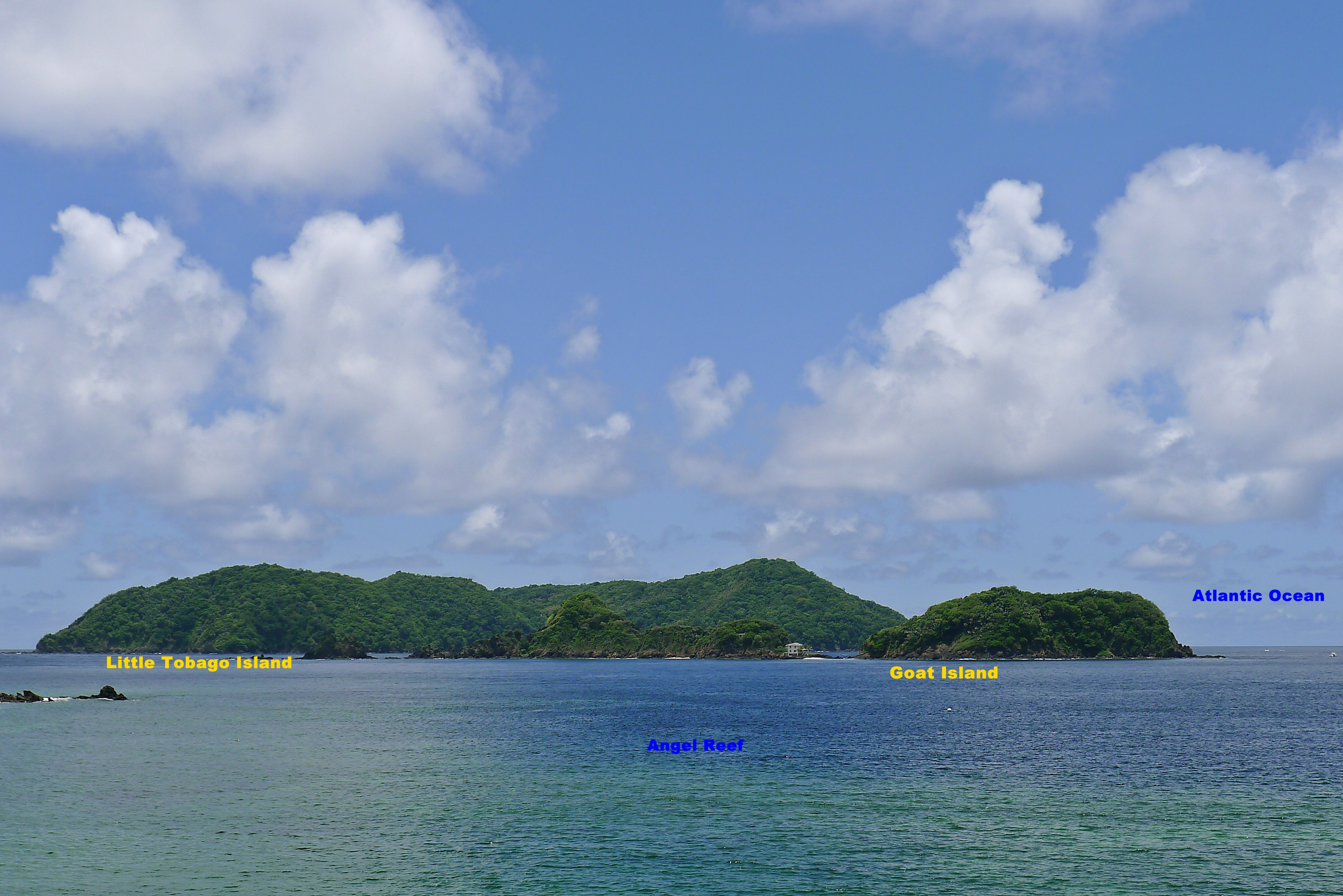
Little Tobago Island and Goat Island

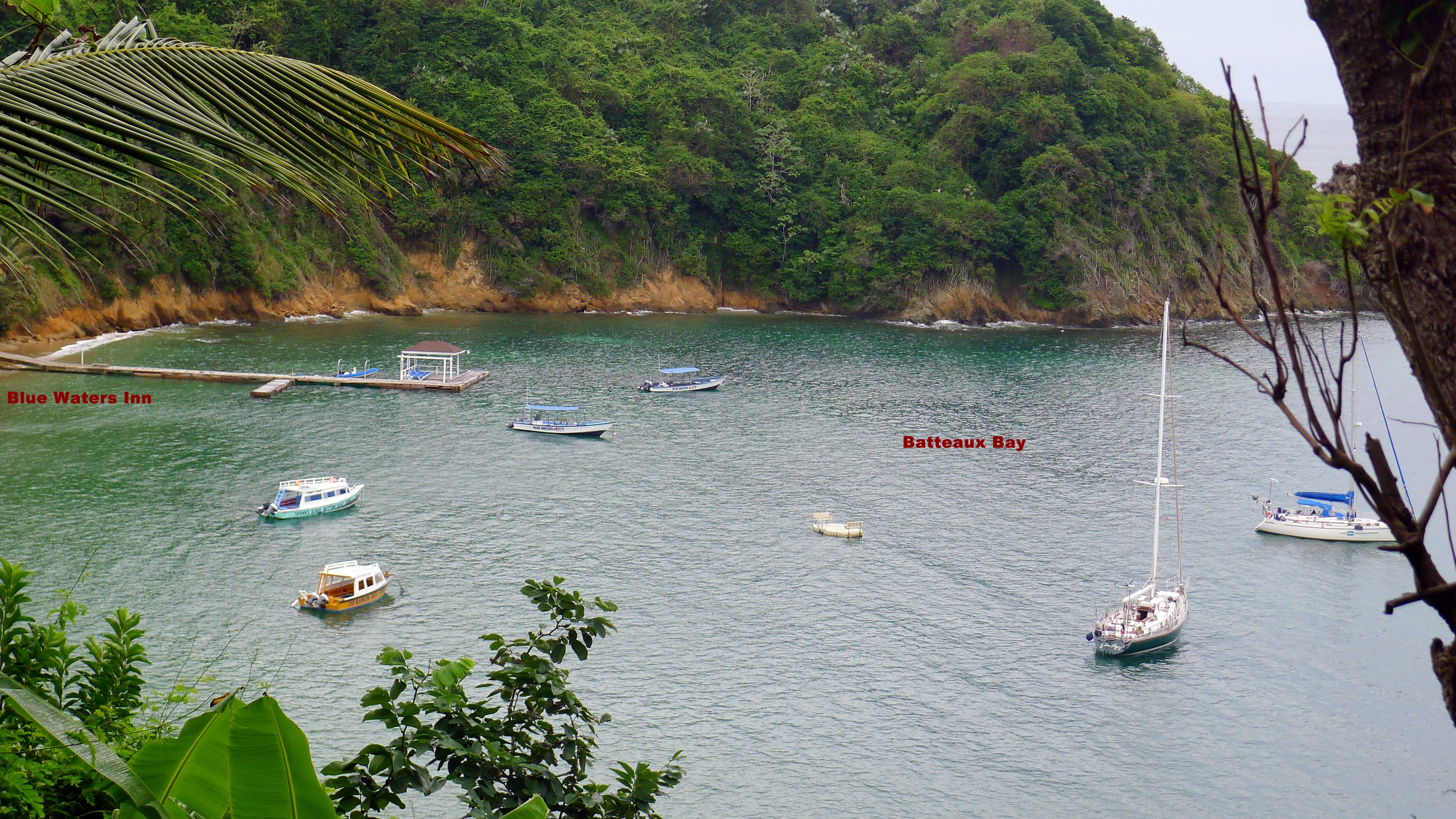
Batteaux Bay

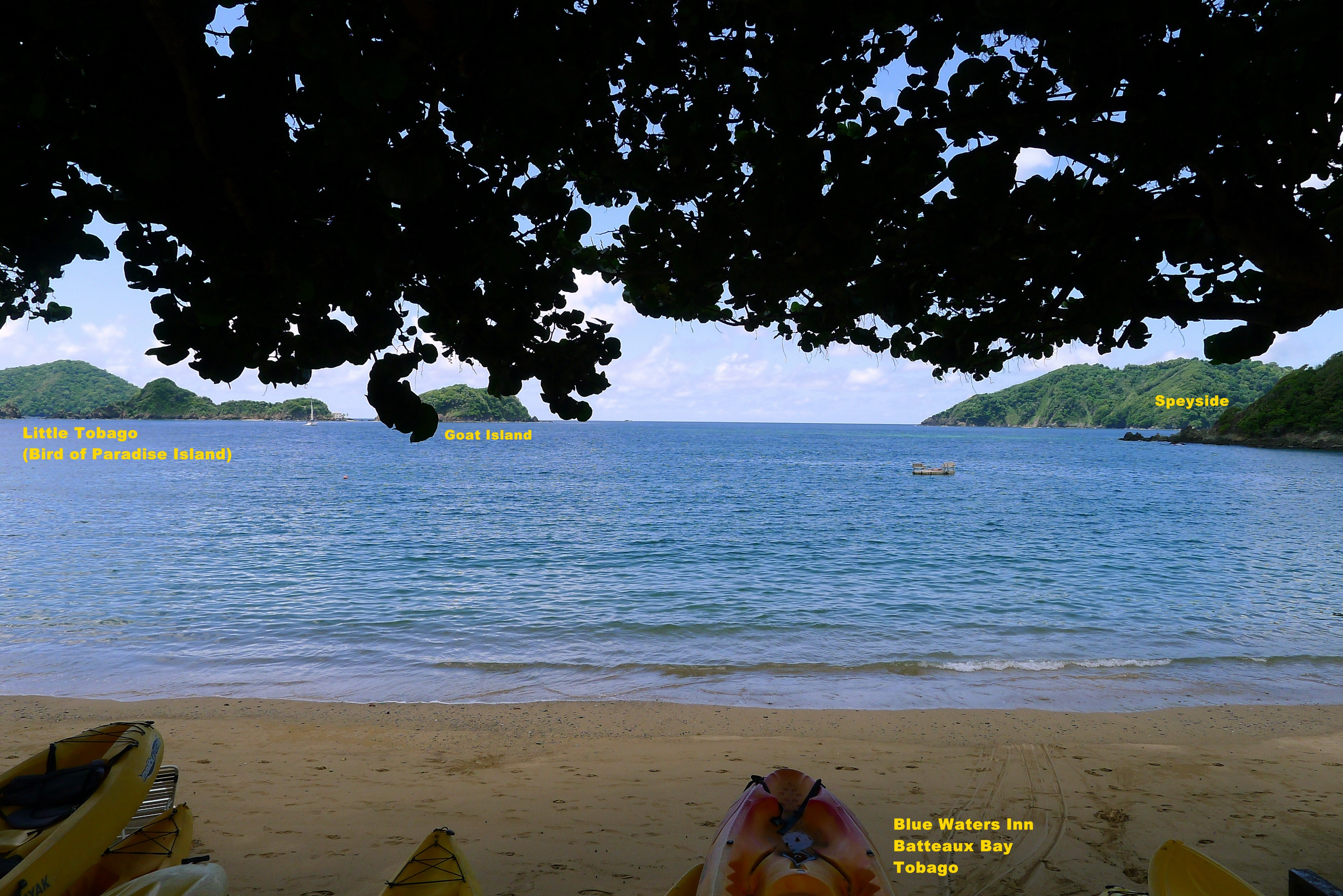
View from the Blue Waters Inn, a resort near the small town of Speyside. A coral reef can be seen off shore, and a bird sanctuary in the distance (Little Tobago Island). Goat Island is also Visible

Speyside is a village in northern Tobago within Saint John Parish. It lies on the leeward coast, across from the island of Little Tobago (for which it is a departure point), 26 km northeast of Scarborough, overlooking Tyrrel's Bay. At the census of population in 2000, the town had a population of 1100.

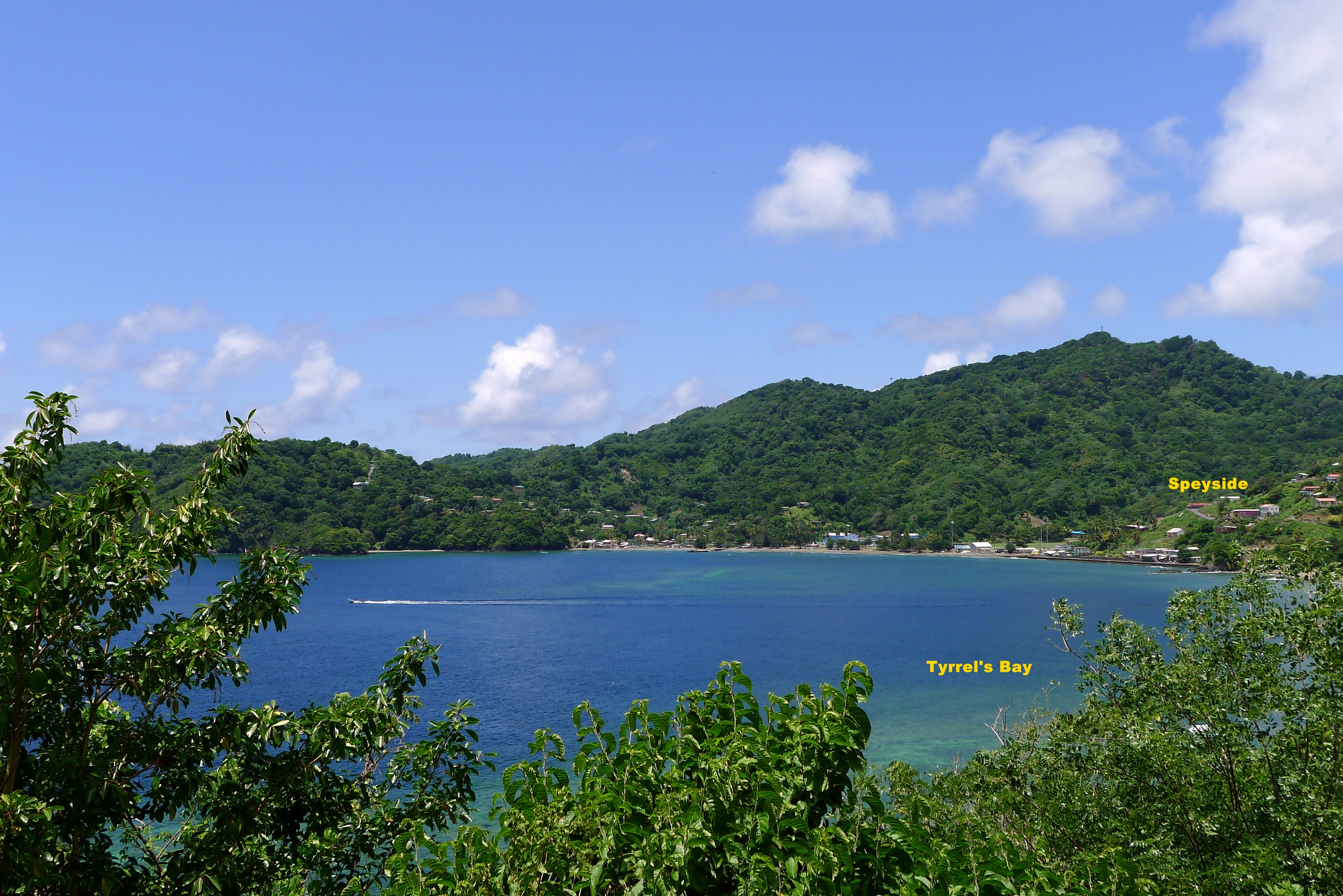
View of Speyside and Tyrrel's Bay from a distance

Speyside has some of the best coral reefs on the island of Tobago, and is a popular dive site. The reefs are less disturbed than the more famous Buccoo Reef in southwestern Tobago.

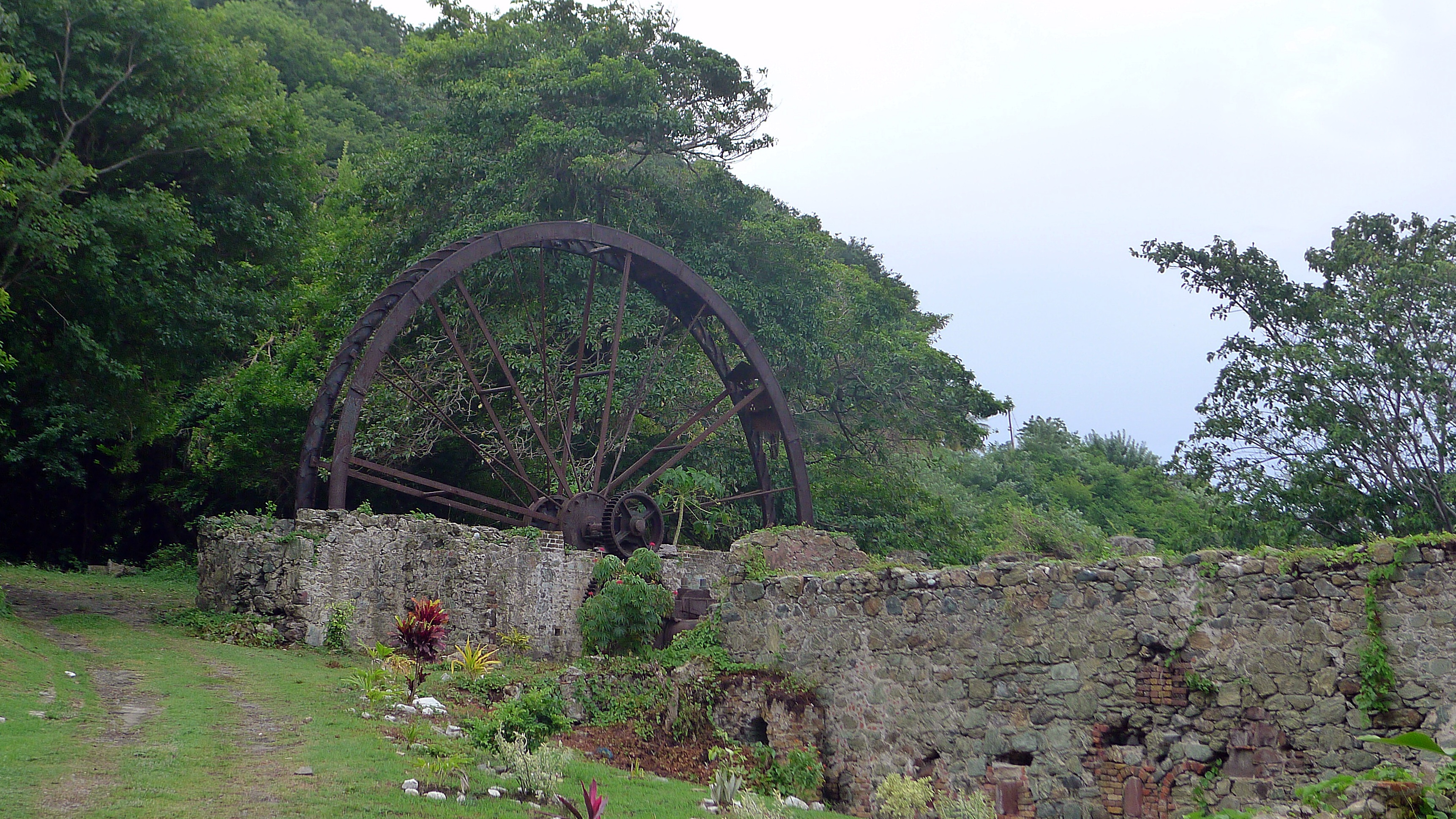
Speyside - Water Wheel

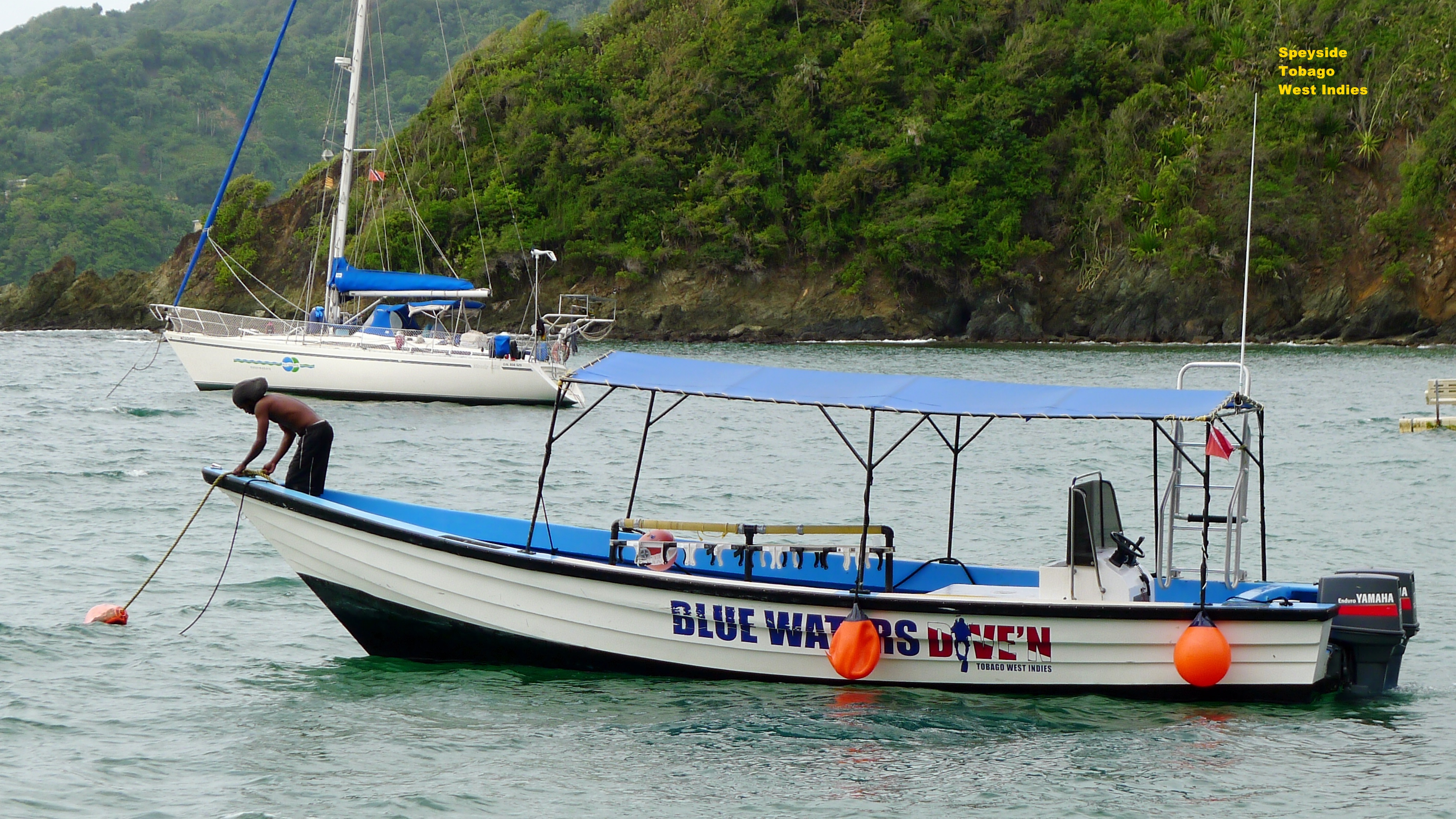
View of a popular diving site offshore

== Infrastructure ==
Speyside is linked to the rest of Tobago by the Windward Road. There is a jetty off the Lucy Vale Road. The town has a high school, Speyside High School, and a health centre, Speyside Health Centre. There are also various hotels and inns as well as a resort, Blue Waters Inn, located on Batteaux Bay.

== Geography ==
Speyside is surrounded by the mountains of Tobago's Main Ridge. The surrounding terrain is very hilly and some roads are very steep. The majority of the town is situated on Tyrrel's Bay. Goat Island and Little Tobago island are located just offshore. The surrounding waters have some of the best coral reefs on the island of Tobago and the sea between the islands is shallow, which allows for glass bottom boats to make trips to the islands.

== Diving ==
With some of the best coral reefs in Tobago located just offshore, Speyside is a very popular dive destination. At Kelleston Drain, just off Little Tobago, divers can observe the world's largest single brain coral colony. At Japanese Gardens, divers witness the most colourful dive site in Speyside. There are also numerous wrecks just offshore, such as the wreck of the Trinity.
