= December 2021 Tobago House of Assembly election =

Legislative election

- 6 December 2021

15 seats in the Tobago House of Assembly 8 seats needed for a majority
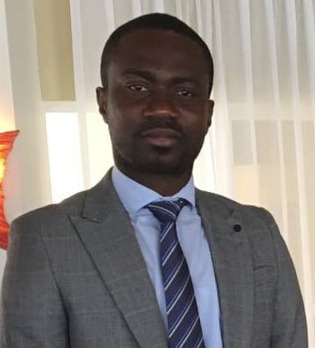

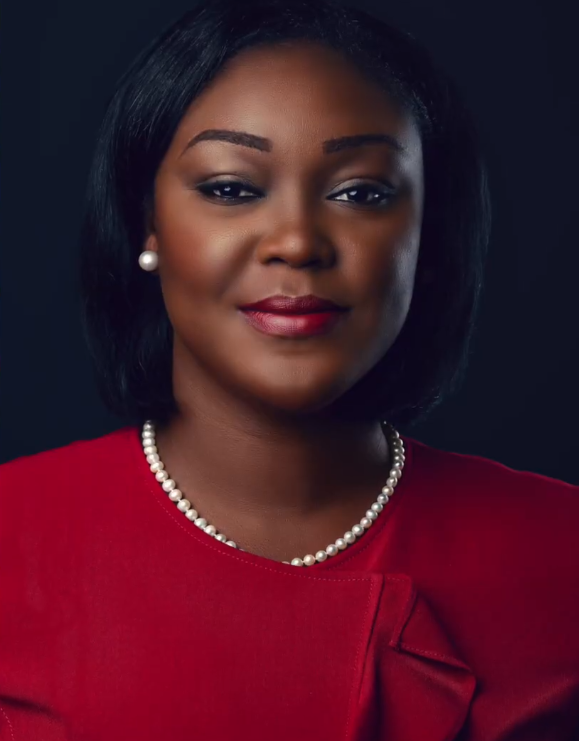
	First party	Second party
Leader	Farley Chavez Augustine	Tracy Davidson-Celestine
Party	PDP	PNM
Leader since	– (Note: Augustine was publicly endorsed as the PDP's Chief Secretary candidate on 25 January 2021, but Watson Duke is party leader.)	27 January 2020
Leader's seat	Parlatuvier / L’Anse Fourmi / Speyside	Lambeau / Signal Hill (lost)
Last election	48.50%, 6 seats	50.36%, 6 seats
Seats won	14	1
Seat change	▲8	▼5
Popular vote	16,933	11,943
Percentage	58.04%	40.93%
Swing	▲9.54%	▼9.43%
Chief Secretary before election
Ancil Dennis (caretaker government)
PNM
Chief Secretary after election
Farley Chavez Augustine
PDP

Snap House of Assembly elections were held in Tobago on 6 December 2021 to elect all 15 members of the Tobago House of Assembly (THA). The election was called following a deadlock created by the January 2021 elections which resulted in a tie between the People's National Movement (PNM) and the Progressive Democratic Patriots (PDP), with both parties winning six seats. As a result, the number of seats in the legislature was increased from 12 to 15 (an odd number) to avoid ties.

The result was a 14-1 victory for the PDP, ending 21 consecutive years of PNM control of the THA. Tobago PNM leader Tracy Davidson-Celestine also lost her constituency election. The incumbent Chief Secretary of Tobago, Ancil Dennis of the PNM, who held a caretaker role since 6 May 2020 due to the resignation of then Chief Secretary Kelvin Charles as a result of the January 2021 election deadlock, was succeeded by Farley Chavez Augustine of the PDP. Augustine was sworn in as the 5th Chief Secretary of the Tobago House of Assembly on 9 December 2021.

== Background ==
=== January 2021 Tobago House of Assembly election ===
The January 2021 Tobago House of Assembly election was held on 25 January 2021 where 12 members were elected in the eleventh election since the THA was established in 1980. This election marked the first time in history an electoral deadlock in the Assembly occurred, where the PNM and the PDP won an equal number seats of 6-6, triggering a constitutional crisis with both political parties and Prime Minister Keith Rowley seeking senior counsel advice on the way forward. This election was the first time in 20 years that the PNM lost its absolute majority.

=== THA Amendment Act 2021 ===
To break the deadlock and a solution to the constitutional crisis Parliament passed and assented the THA Amendment Act in March 2021 gave the Election and Boundaries Commission (EBC) a mandate to increase the number of seats in the Tobago's regional assembly from 12 to an uneven 15 to avoid potential seat ties in the future. On 15 September the House of Representatives passed the EBC (Local Government and Tobago House of Assembly) (Tobago) Order by a margin of 21–18, after which it was passed in the Senate. The bill added three new seats: Lambeau/Lowlands, Darryl Spring/Whim, and Mt St George/Goodwood where two of the original districts were slightly modified under the bill. After the Act being signed into law by the President on 6 October 2021, Chief Secretary Ancil Dennis announced that the December 2021 THA elections were to be held on 6 December 2021.

=== Lead candidates ===
Incumbent Minority Leader in the THA, PDP political leader and Public Services Association President Watson Duke publicly reaffirmed his endorsement of the incumbent assembly member for Parlatuvier/L’Anse Fourmi/Speyside and PDP deputy political leader, Farley Chavez Augustine, as the party's lead candidate for the election. Following the January 2021 Tobago House of Assembly election Tracy Davidson-Celestine, leader of the PNM Tobago Council, became the first female political leader of the THA. Her endorsement was reaffirmed by the PNM Tobago Council and Rowley in his position as political leader of the PNM.

=== New political party ===
On 1 August 2021, Emancipation Day, a new political party called the Innovative Democratic Alliance (IDA) was launched by former PNM member Denise Tsoiafatt Angus who ran unsuccessfully as an independent in the January 2021 elections for the Scarborough/Calder Hall seat. In November 2021, the party unveiled 12 candidates for the 6 December elections with Tsoiafatt-Angus competing for the Bethel/New Grange seat.

== Electoral system ==
All fifteen members are elected via First-past-the-post voting.

All Tobagonians and Commonwealth citizens aged 18 or over, legally resident in Tobago and who have resided in an electoral district for at least two months prior to the election date are entitled to vote in the elections.

== Campaign ==
With the loss of four seats to the PDP in the January 2021 THA elections resulting in a 6-6 deadlock, the PNM lost their majority in the Assembly after 20 years of control. With the stakes even higher than the January elections, the PDP campaigned on being an indigenous Tobagonian party proposing a change of the current order to attain independent self-government and equality of status to Trinidad within the Republic. The PNM focused on their 20 years of stable leadership of the Assembly, their management during the COVID-19 pandemic, and the continuous forging of sustainable development throughout the island. Concerns were raised that Trinidadian personalities were attempting to influence the Tobagonian electorate both on the ground and on social media. Accusations were then levelled towards the Election and Boundaries Commission (EBC) for gerrymandering in favor of the PNM with the creation of three new seats as a solution to the 6-6 deadlock.

During the campaign trail past issues were rehashed; the incomplete Main Ridge Forest zip line project and the leadership decisions of Tracy Davidson-Celestine surrounding the resignation of Kelvin Charles as Chief Secretary and the expulsion from the PNM Tobago Council of the then-Presiding Officer (now IDA founder) and Political Leader, Dr. Denise Tsoiafatt Angus. As for the PDP, allegations were made that they were a proxy for the United National Congress (UNC) with the aim for Tobago to secede from Trinidad. Also, the leadership role and past decision making of controversial political leader Watson Duke as Public Services Association President were highlighted. Questions were raised about his treatment towards women, including the issue of being charged with rape in 2016 that is still ongoing before the court. As a tactical change from the January elections, Duke took a reserved approach as Political Leader with Farley Augustine being pushed to the frontline as the face of the PDP.

In the final weeks of the campaign, lewd videos and leaked WhatsApp voice notes began circulating on social media of PNM candidate for Parlatuvier/L'Anse Fourmi/Speyside Franka Cordner making disparaging remarks towards THA Chief Secretary Ancil Dennis and Member of Parliament for Tobago East Ayanna Webster-Roy, remarks that Cordner has since apologized for. Meanwhile, in Trinidad, the UNC accused the Prime Minister Dr. Keith Rowley, himself a Tobagonian and the political leader of the PNM, for failing to declare to the Integrity Commission his interest in the Inez Gate Private Development at Shirvan Road, Mount Pleasant. This charge was vigorously defended and dismissed by Dr. Rowley in a media conference accusing the UNC of intervening and assisting the PDP in the final week of the election campaign.

== Results ==
Party	Votes	%	Seats	+/–
Progressive Democratic Patriots	16,933	58.04	14	+8
Tobago Council of the People's National Movement	11,943	40.93	1	–5
Innovative Democratic Alliance	295	1.01	0	New
Unity of the People	6	0.02	0	0
Class Action Reform Movement	0	0.00	0	0
Total	29,177	100.00	15	+3
Valid votes	29,177	99.67		
Invalid/blank votes	97	0.33		
Total votes	29,274	100.00		
Registered voters/turnout	51,383	56.97		
Source: Elections and Boundaries Commission
