= Buccoo Reef =

Coral reef ecosystem of Tobago

Coordinates: 11.185°N 60.833°W

Designations

Ramsar Wetland
- Official name: Buccoo Reef / Bon Accord Lagoon Complex
- Designated: 8 July 2005
- Reference no.: 1496

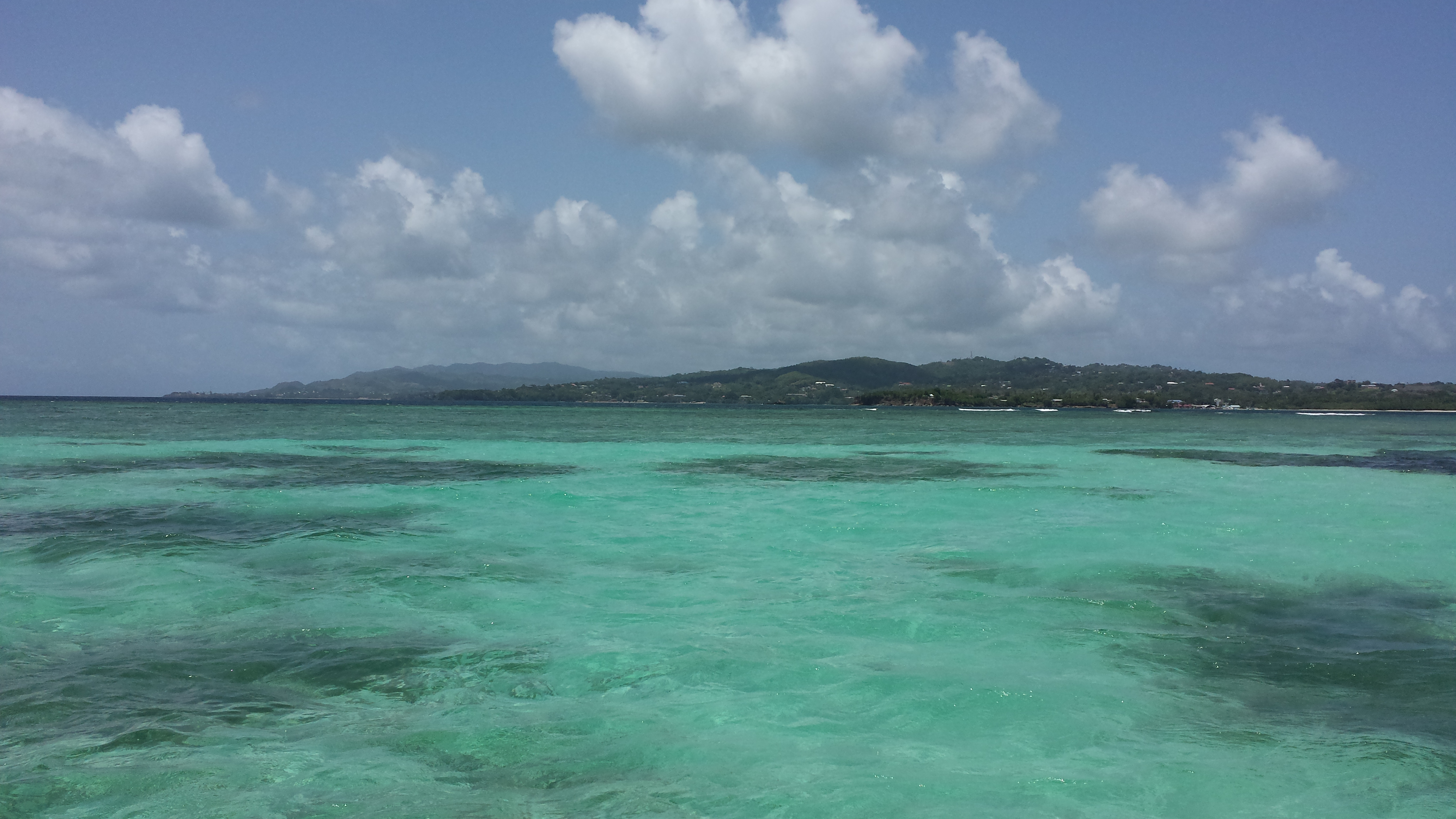
The shallow waters of the Buccoo Reef Complex, Tobago, West Indies

The island of Tobago has multiple coral reef ecosystems. The Buccoo Reef, the Culloden Reed and Speyside Reef are the three largest coral reef marine ecosystems in Tobago. The Buccoo Reef is a coralline reef ecosystem that is located on the southwestern region of Tobago. It is a popular ecotourism attraction where tourists can snorkel and see the coral reefs and schools of fish without diving equipment. The Trinidad and Tobago Tourism Ministry estimates that 90% of its tourists visit the Buccoo Reef while exploring Tobago. The Buccoo Reef, also known as the Buccoo Reef Complex, spans 7 km^{2} and has five reef flats that can reach up to 25 metres in depth. The reef complex has been designated as part of a protected Ramsar site since 2005.

In 1973, the Buccoo Reef Complex was designated as a protected marine park, called the Buccoo Reef Marine Park to monitor the health of the coral reef ecosystem. Approximately 90% of Tobago's coastal shoreline is protected by coral reefs, including the Buccoo Reef Complex. These coral reefs help protect Tobago's land from eroding and avoiding landslides. In 1999, a non-profit organization called the Buccoo Reef Trust was created to help the Trinidad and Tobago government in developing its marine education department and organizing sustainability projects, including the preservation of the Buccoo Reef Complex and other coral reefs.

The Buccoo Reef Complex is made up of a shallow lagoon, seagrass beds and a mangrove wetland. The dominant corals in the Buccoo Reef Complex are the Montastrea species, the thin finger (Porites divaricata) corals and the fire corals (Millepora species). In this region, the coral reefs experience two seasons: the dry season, which spans from January to May, and the wet season, which spans from June to December. Sea surface temperatures in the Buccoo Reef Complex range between 26 °C to 31 °C. The Buccoo Reef complex receives freshwater and nutrients from the Orinoco River. The nutrient flow from the Orinoco River allow the proliferation of plankton. Approximately 119 species of fish inhabit the Buccoo Reef Complex. These fish species benefit from the pool of plankton and they use the Buccoo Reef Complex to spawn and regenerate their populations.

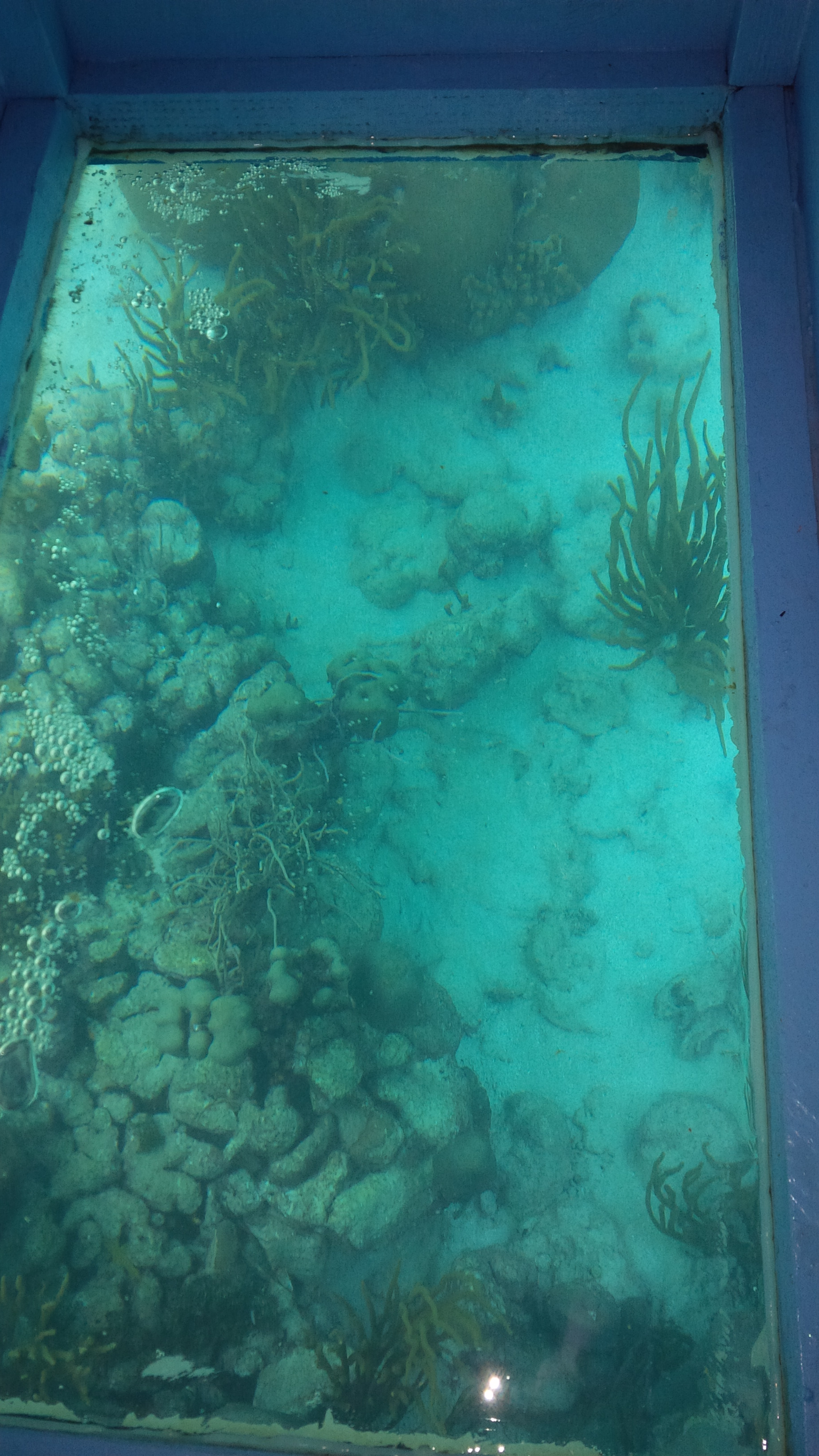
A picture of the Buccoo Reef Complex from a glass boat tour.

Since 1970, the Buccoo Reef Complex has been declared at risk by marine scientists due to the rise of pollution, poor water quality, eutrophication and coral bleaching Approximately 28% of coral cover in the Buccoo Reef Marine Park has decreased from 1994 to 2008. Coral reef health has also declined during this period due to sedimentation, nutrient runoff from and thermal stress from urbanization in Tobago. Three major coral bleaching events occurred in Tobago in 1998, 2005 and 2010 that also affected the coral cover of many coral reefs, including the Buccoo Reef. Following the bleaching event in 2005, the Buccoo Reef Trust conducted a study on the impact of bleaching event on all coral reefs across Tobago. It was found that many of the dominant corals in the Buccoo Reef Complex were significantly bleached. After the 2010 coral bleaching event in Tobago, the overall hard coral taxa cover has decreased from 25.19% in 2010 to 16.38% in 2012 at the Buccoo Reef Complex. Over the 2010–2012 period, macroalgae species increased from 15.87% cover to 37.90% cover in the Buccoo Reef Complex.
