= Progressive Democratic Patriots =

- Abbreviation: PDP
- Leader: Watson Duke
- Chairperson: Sean Alexander Nedd
- Founder: Watson Solomon Duke
- Founded: December 2015
- Headquarters: Portmall, Milford Road, Scarborough, Saint Andrew, Tobago, Trinidad and Tobago
- Ideology: Tobago autonomism Tobago independence
- Colors: Green; Black
- Senate: 0 / 31
- House of Representatives: 0 / 41
- Tobago House of Assembly: 0 / 15

Website
- pdptobago.org

The Progressive Democratic Patriots (PDP) is a political party in Trinidad and Tobago. Founded in 2016, it became the second-largest party in Tobagonian politics following the decline of the Tobago Organisation of the People. The party planned to contest the Trinidadian local election and every seat in the next general election, officially launching as a national party on 1 May 2022. It later provided a plan for Tobagonian independence.

In the January 2021 Tobago House of Assembly election, the party won the same number of seats (6) as the Tobago Council of the People's National Movement, breaking their streak of winning every Tobago House of Assembly election since 2001. It later led to a snap election being called in December 2021 Tobago House of Assembly election December to break the tie, as well as an increase in the number of legislative seats from 12 to 15 (an odd number) to avoid future ties.

In the December 2021 Tobago House of Assembly snap election, the PDP won an unprecedented 14 out of the 15 seats available, ending 21 consecutive years of PNM control over the Assembly. PDP member Farley Chavez Augustine was sworn in as the 5th Chief Secretary of the Tobago House of Assembly on 9 December 2021.

In 2022, 13 PDP members of the Tobago House of Assembly left the party, leaving the leader, Watson Duke, as the sole PDP Assembly member. The party did not contest the 2026 Tobago House of Assembly election, and Watson Duke endorsed the Tobago People's Party.

== Election results ==
=== House of Representatives ===
Election	Party leader	Tobago			+/–	Government
Election	Party leader	Votes	%	Seats	+/–	Government
2020	Watson Duke	10,367	38.6 (#2)	0 / 2	New	No seats
2025	Watson Duke	1,396	5.2 (#3)	0 / 2	Steady	No seats

=== Tobago House of Assembly ===
Election year	Party leader	Votes	%	Seats	+/–	Govt?
2017	Watson Duke	7,537	31.0 (#2)	2 / 12	New	Opposition
Jan 2021	Watson Duke	12,798	48.5 (#2)	6 / 12	▲4	Snap election
Dec 2021	Watson Duke	16,933	58.0 (#1)	14 / 15	▲8	Government (2021–2022)
Dec 2021	Watson Duke	16,933	58.0 (#1)	14 / 15	▲8	Opposition (2022–)
2026	Didn't contest election and party leader endorsed the Tobago People's Party					
