= Ancil Dennis =

Tobago politician

The Honourable Ancil Dennis
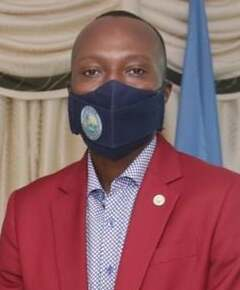
- Ancil Dennis in 2021

Member of the Senate
- Incumbent
- Assumed office 25 September 2024

Chief Secretary of Tobago
- In office 6 May 2020 – 8 December 2021
- Preceded by: Joel Jack
- Succeeded by: Farley Chavez Augustine

Personal details
- Party: People's National Movement (PNM)

Ancil Dennis is a Tobago politician from the People's National Movement. He served as Chief Secretary of Tobago from 2020 to 2021.

== Career ==
In September 2024, he replaced Laurel Lezama-Lee Sing in the Senate. He was formerly the Deputy Presiding Officer of the Tobago House of Assembly. At 26, Dennis became the youngest assemblyman after winning Buccoo/Mt Pleasant in the 2013 Tobago House of Assembly election.
