= Tobago =

Autonomous island in the Republic of Trinidad and Tobago

- Ward
- Ward of Tobago
- Etymology: Tabaco (transl. Tobacco)
- Map of Tobago with its parishes

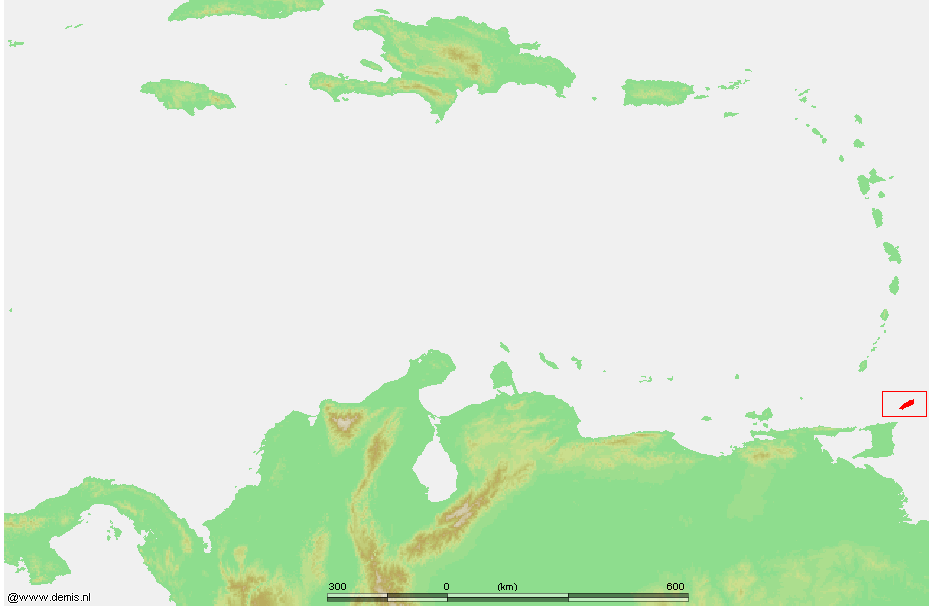
- Location of Tobago in the Caribbean
- Country: Trinidad and Tobago
- Capital and largest city: Scarborough; 11°11′0″N 60°44′15″W
- Official languages: English
- Vernacular language: Tobagonian Creole
- Ethnic groups (2011): 85.3% African; 8.5% Mixed; 4.2% Dougla; 2.5% Indian; 1.0% Other; 2.6% Not stated
- Religion (2011): 72.9% Christianity; 66.2% Protestantism; 6.6% Roman Catholicism; 12.4% Other; 5.4% None; 9.8% Not stated
- Demonym(s): Tobagonian
- Government: Autonomous administrative division
  - Chief Secretary: Farley Chavez Augustine
  - House Presiding Officer: Abby Taylor
- Legislature: Tobago House of Assembly

National representation
  - House of Representatives: 2 MPs

Area
  - Total: 300 km^{2} (120 sq mi)

Population
  - 2011 census: 60,735
  - Density: 203/km^{2} (525.8/sq mi)
- Currency: Trinidad and Tobago dollar (TTD)
- Time zone: UTC-4 (AST)
- Driving side: Left
- Calling code: +1 (868)

Tobago, (Note: Pronounced /təˈbeɪɡoʊ/) officially the Ward of Tobago, is an island and ward in Trinidad and Tobago. It is 35 kilometres (20 nautical miles) northeast of the larger island of Trinidad and about 160 kilometres (85 nautical miles) off Venezuela's northeastern coast. It is southeast of Grenada and southwest of Barbados.

== Etymology ==
Christopher Columbus named Tobago Belaforme "because from a distance it seemed beautiful". The Spanish friar Antonio Vázquez de Espinosa wrote that the Kalina (mainland Caribs) called the island Urupina because of its resemblance to a big snail, while the Kalinago (Island Caribs) called it Aloubaéra, supposedly because it resembled the alloüebéra, a giant snake that supposedly lived in a cave on the island of Dominica. The earliest known record of the use of the name Tabaco to refer to the island is a Spanish royal order issued in 1511. That name was inspired by the resemblance of the island's shape to the fat cigars smoked by the Taíno inhabitants of the Greater Antilles.

== History ==
=== Indigenous Tobago ===
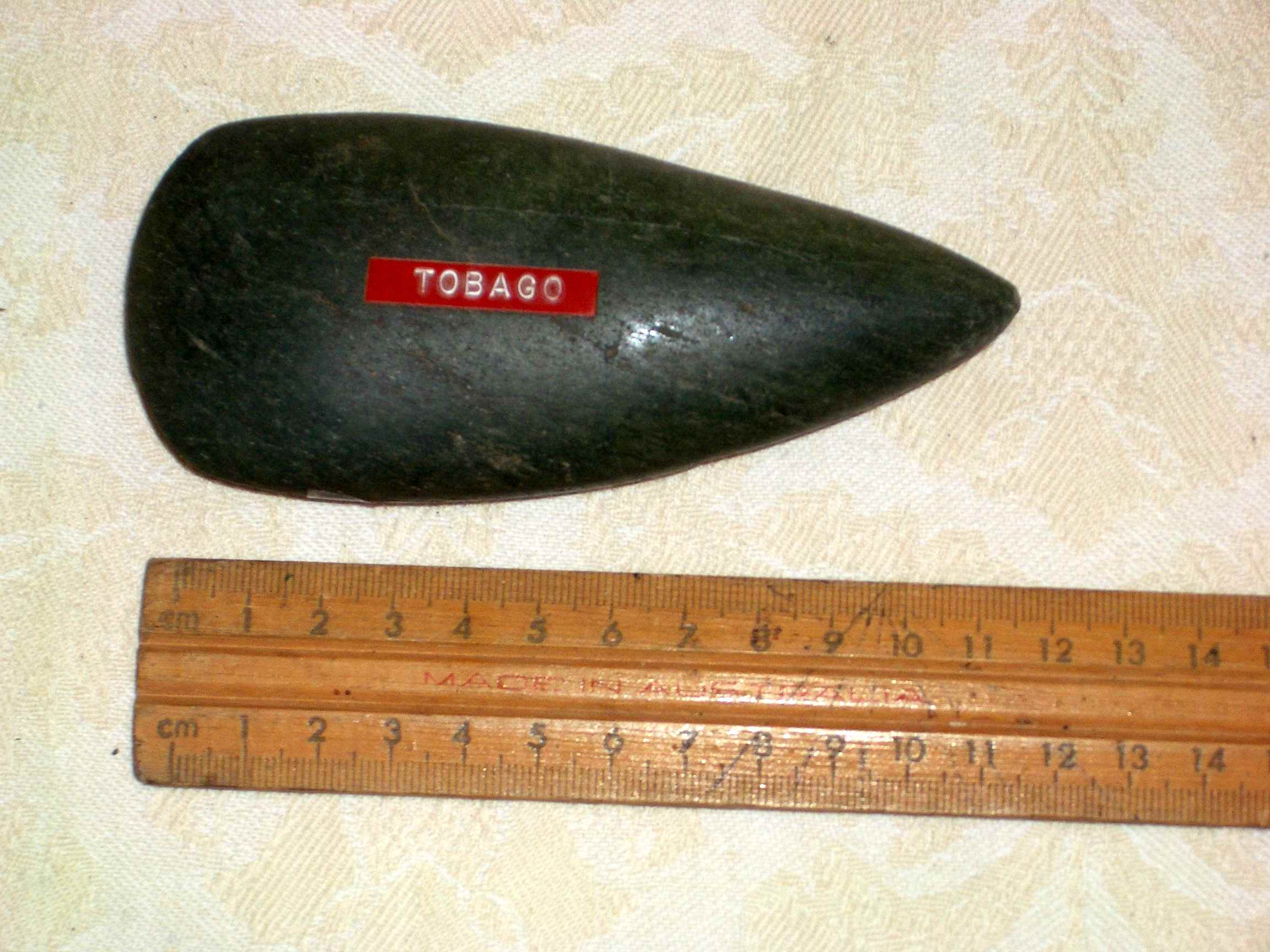
Greenstone ceremonial axe, from shell midden, Mount Irvine Bay, Tobago, 1957.

Tobago was settled by Indigenous people belonging to the Ortoiroid cultural tradition sometime between 3500 and 1000 BCE. In the first century of the Common Era, Saladoid people settled in Tobago. They brought with them pottery-making and agricultural traditions, and are likely to have introduced crops which included cassava, sweet potatoes, Indian yam, tannia and corn. Saladoid cultural traditions were later modified by the introduction of the Barrancoid culture, either by trade or a combination of trade and settlement. After 650 CE, the Saladoid culture was replaced by the Troumassoid tradition in Tobago. Troumassoid traditions were once thought to represent the settlement of the "Island Caribs" in the Lesser Antilles and Tobago, but this is now associated with the Cayo ceramic tradition. No archaeological sites exclusively associated with the Cayo tradition are known from Tobago.

Tobago's location made it an important point of connection between the Kalinago of the Lesser Antilles and their Kalina allies and trading partners in the Guianas and Venezuela. In the 1630s Tobago was inhabited by the Kalina, while the neighbouring island of Grenada was shared by the Kalina and Kalinago.

Columbus sighted Tobago on 14 August 1498 but he did not land. The Spanish settlers in Hispaniola were authorised to conduct slave raids against the island in a royal order issued in 1511. These raids, which continued until at least the 1620s, decimated the island's population.

=== European colonisation ===
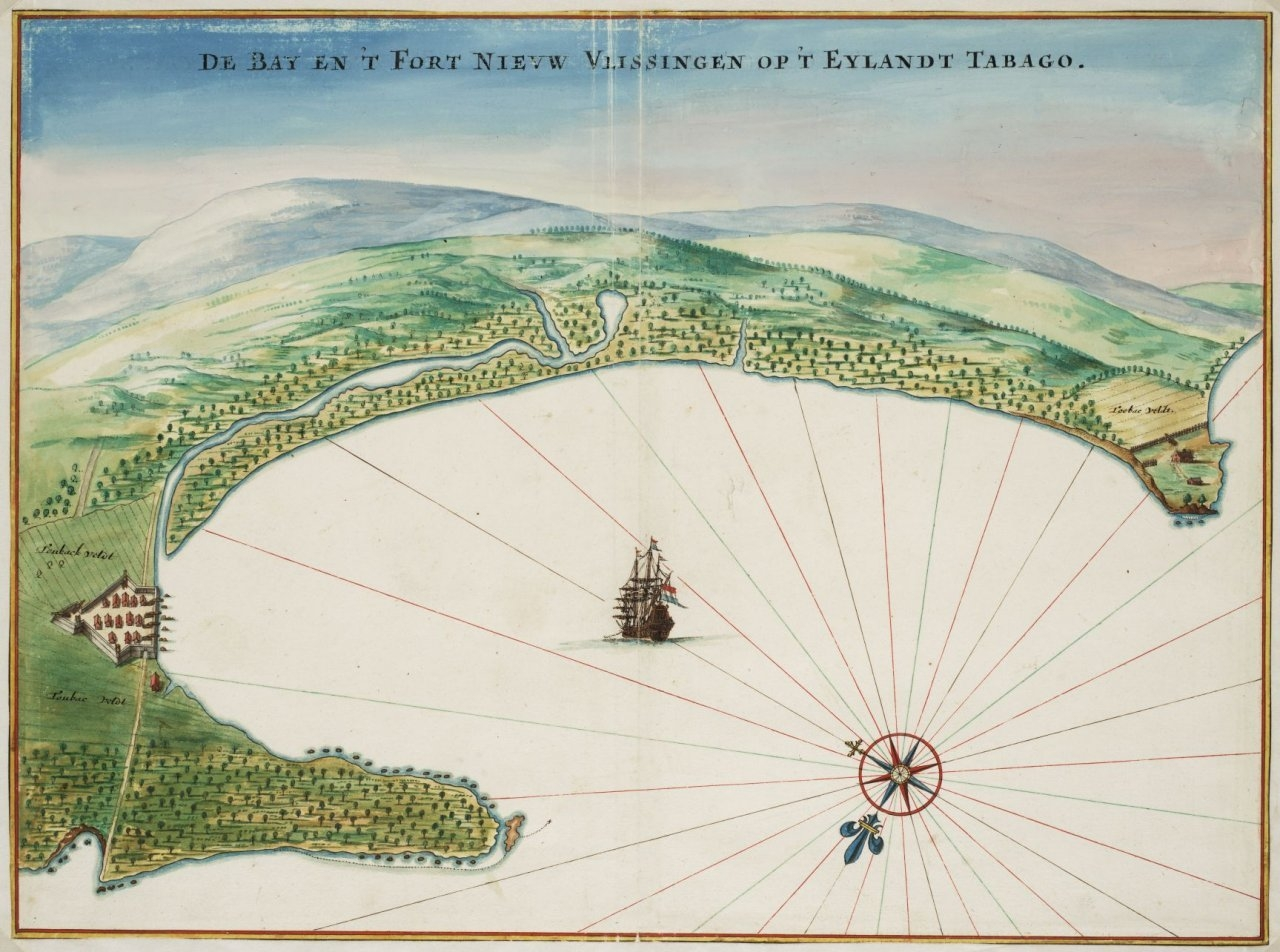
Seventeenth-century map showing the fort of Nieuw Vlissingen.

In 1628, Dutch settlers established the first European settlement in Tobago, a colony they called Nieuw Walcheren at Great Courland Bay. They also built a fort, Nieuw Vlissingen, near the modern town of Plymouth. The settlement was abandoned in 1630 after Indigenous attacks, but was re-established in 1633. The new colony was destroyed by the Spanish in Trinidad after the Dutch supported a Nepoyo-led revolt in Trinidad. Attempts by the English to colonise Tobago in the 1630s and 1640s also failed due to Indigenous resistance.

Over the ensuing years, the Curonians (Duchy of Courland), Dutch, English, French, Spanish and Swedish had caused Tobago to become a focal point in repeated attempts of colonisation, which led to the island having changed hands 33 times, the most in Caribbean history, before the Treaty of Paris ceded it to the British in 1814. In 1662, the Dutch brothers Adrian and Cornelius Lampsins were granted the title of Barons of Tobago, and ruled until the English captured the island in 1666. Adrian briefly recaptured Tobago in 1673, but was killed in battle when the English, under Sir Tobias Bridge, yet again took control of the island.

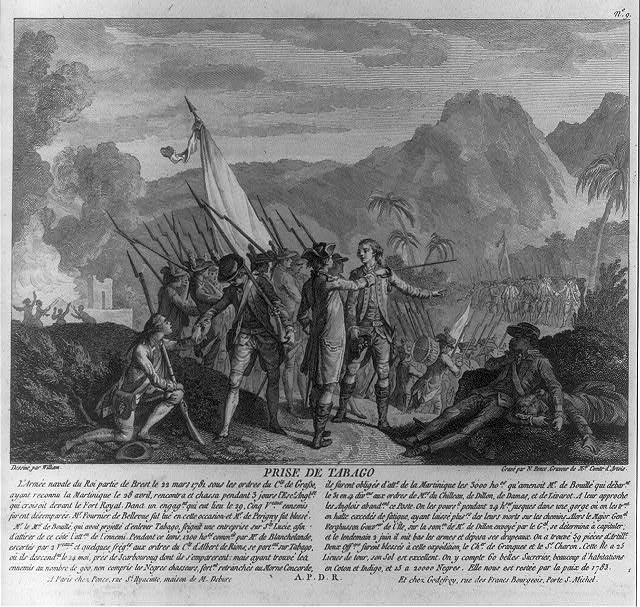
French attack on the British island of Tobago in 1781 with text. French painting from 1784.

From about 1672, during the temporary English rule of 1672–1674, Tobago had a period of stability during which plantation culture began. Sugar, cotton and indigo factories sprang up and Africans were imported by the British to work as slaves. The economy flourished. France had abandoned the island to Britain in 1763, and by 1777 Tobago was exporting great quantities of cotton, indigo, rum and sugar.

In 1781, the French retook the island during the Invasion of Tobago. On 24 May 1781, the fleet of Comte de Grasse landed troops on the island under the command of General Marquis de Bouillé. By 2 June 1781, they had successfully gained control of the island.

=== British rule and independence ===
In 1814, when the island again came under British control, another phase of successful sugar-production began. But a severe hurricane in 1847, combined with the collapse of plantation underwriters, end of slavery in 1834 and the competition from sugar with other European countries, marked the end of the sugar trade. In 1889, the island became a ward of Trinidad. Without sugar, the islanders had to grow other crops, planting acres of limes, coconuts and cocoa and exporting their produce to Trinidad. In 1963, Hurricane Flora ravaged Tobago, destroying the villages and crops. A restructuring programme followed and attempts were made to diversify the economy. The development of a tourist industry began.

Trinidad and Tobago obtained independence from the British Empire in August 1962 and became a republic on 31 August 1976.

== Geography ==
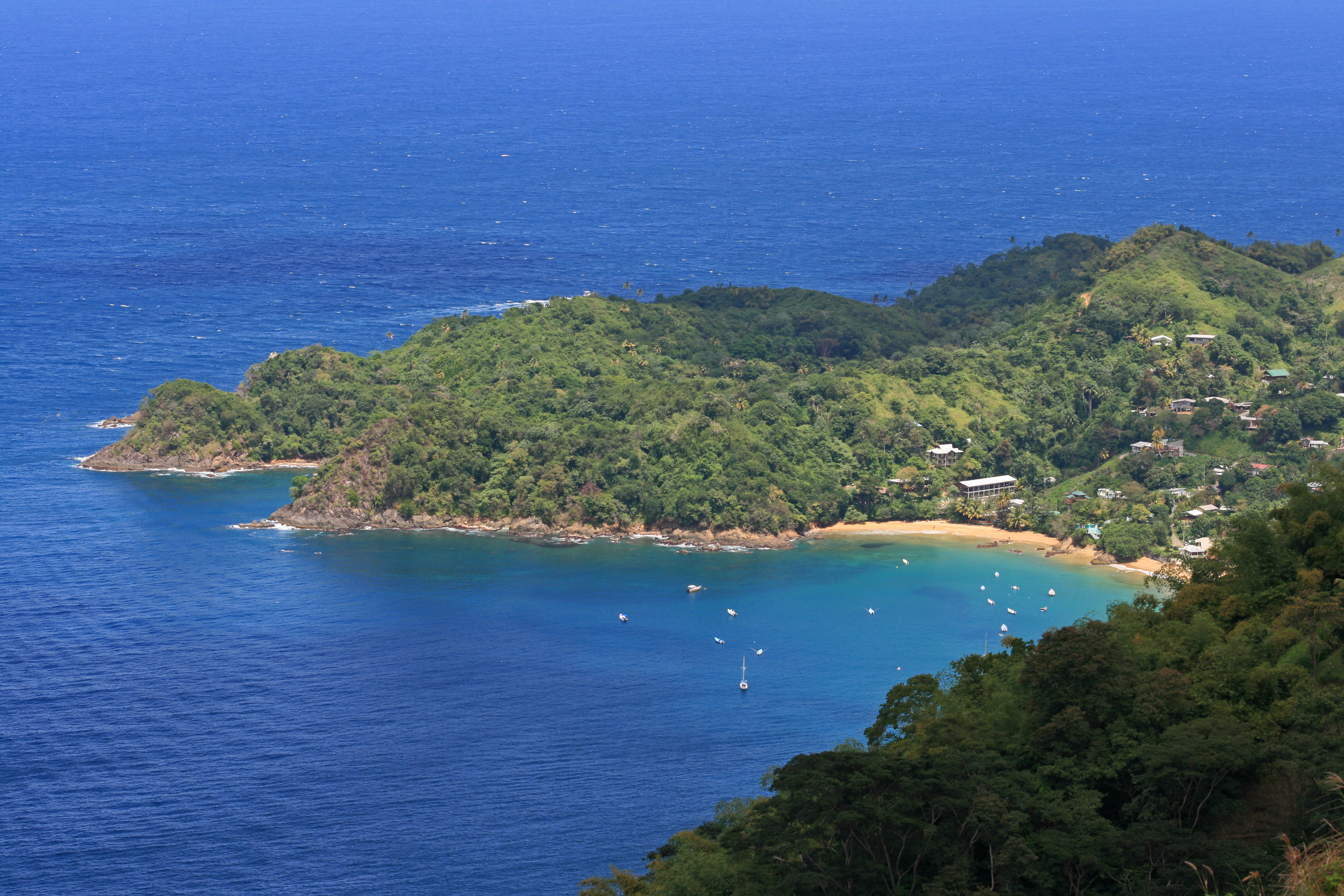
Castara Bay

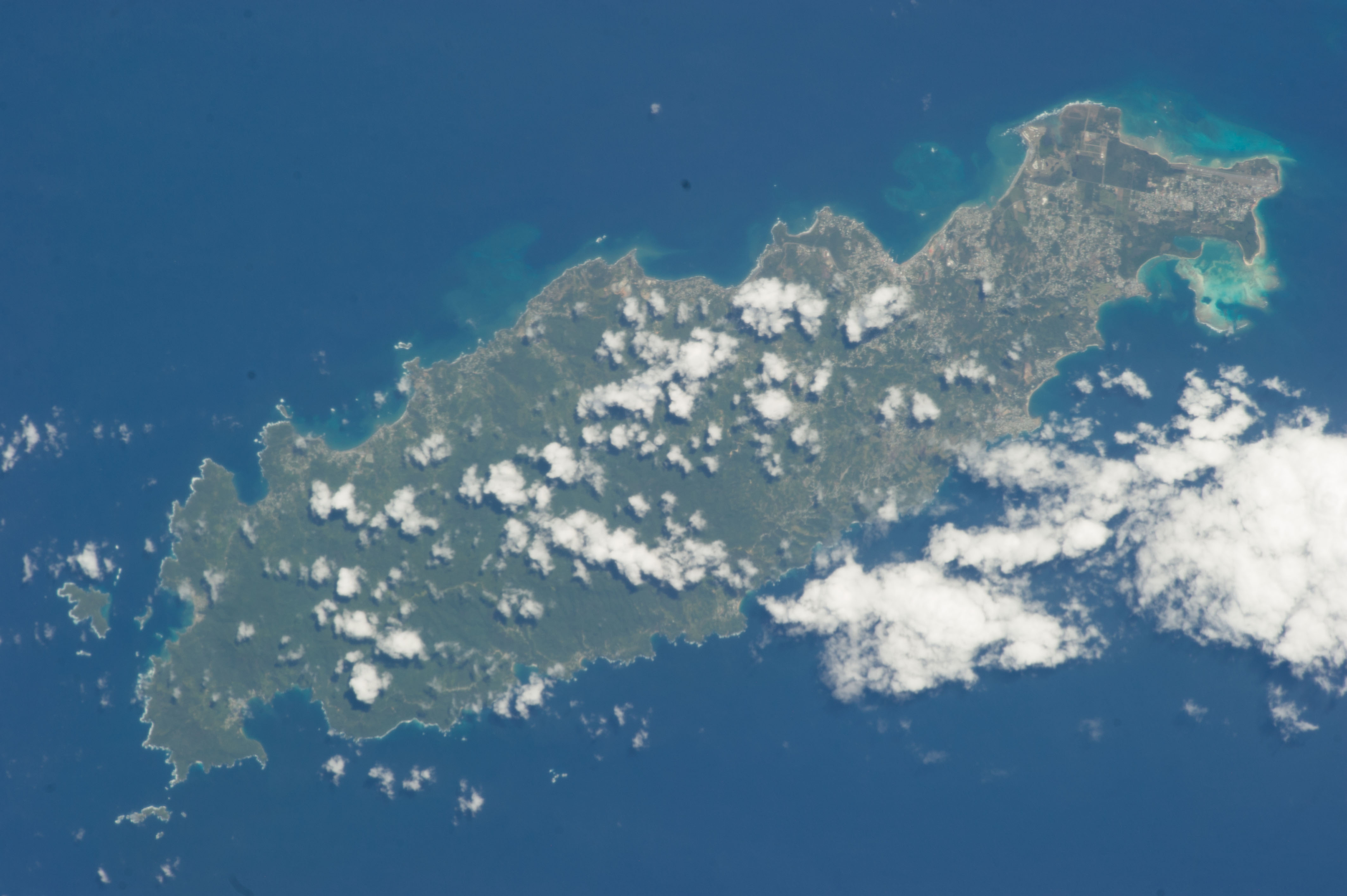
Tobago from space

Tobago has a land area of 300 km^{2} and is approximately 40 kilometres (25 miles) long and 10 kilometres (6 miles) wide. It is located at latitude 11° 15' N, longitude 60° 40' W, slightly north of Trinidad.

The island of Tobago is the main exposed portion of the Tobago terrane, a fragment of crustal material lying between the Caribbean and South American Plates. Tobago is primarily hilly, mountainous and of volcanic origin. The southwest of the island is flat and consists largely of coralline limestone. The mountainous spine of the island is called the Main Ridge. The highest point in Tobago is the 550 metres (1,800 ft) Pigeon Peak near Speyside.

=== Climate ===
The climate is tropical, and the island lies just south of the Atlantic Main Development Region, making it vulnerable to occasional low-latitude tropical cyclones. Average rainfall varies between 3,800 mm (150 inches) on the Main Ridge to less than 1,250 mm (49 inches) in the southwest. There are two seasons: a wet season between June and December, and a dry season between January and May.

Climate data for Tobago (A.N.R. Robinson International Airport) (1973–2004)
Month	Jan	Feb	Mar	Apr	May	Jun	Jul	Aug	Sep	Oct	Nov	Dec	Year
Record high °C (°F)	32.4 (90.3)	33.1 (91.6)	33.2 (91.8)	35.0 (95.0)	34.0 (93.2)	33.4 (92.1)	33.0 (91.4)	35.0 (95.0)	33.8 (92.8)	33.7 (92.7)	32.8 (91.0)	36.1 (97.0)	36.1 (97.0)
Mean daily maximum °C (°F)	30.2 (86.4)	30.5 (86.9)	30.9 (87.6)	31.4 (88.5)	31.7 (89.1)	31.1 (88.0)	30.7 (87.3)	31.2 (88.2)	31.5 (88.7)	31.4 (88.5)	30.9 (87.6)	30.3 (86.5)	31.0 (87.8)
Daily mean °C (°F)	26.3 (79.3)	26.5 (79.7)	26.8 (80.2)	27.6 (81.7)	28.1 (82.6)	27.6 (81.7)	27.4 (81.3)	27.6 (81.7)	27.8 (82.0)	27.6 (81.7)	27.3 (81.1)	26.7 (80.1)	27.3 (81.1)
Mean daily minimum °C (°F)	22.5 (72.5)	22.5 (72.5)	22.8 (73.0)	23.9 (75.0)	24.6 (76.3)	24.2 (75.6)	24.0 (75.2)	24.0 (75.2)	24.1 (75.4)	23.9 (75.0)	23.6 (74.5)	23.0 (73.4)	23.6 (74.5)
Record low °C (°F)	19.0 (66.2)	19.0 (66.2)	19.2 (66.6)	18.7 (65.7)	21.0 (69.8)	20.1 (68.2)	21.0 (69.8)	20.3 (68.5)	20.0 (68.0)	19.1 (66.4)	19.2 (66.6)	19.6 (67.3)	18.7 (65.7)
Average precipitation mm (inches)	65.9 (2.59)	52.8 (2.08)	21.4 (0.84)	52.9 (2.08)	105.8 (4.17)	172.5 (6.79)	266.9 (10.51)	244.6 (9.63)	182.6 (7.19)	240.2 (9.46)	207.5 (8.17)	161.0 (6.34)	1,774.2 (69.85)
Average precipitation days (≥ 1 mm)	9.8	7.0	5.2	5.2	8.9	15.6	17.1	15.4	13.7	14.8	16.2	13.0	142.0
Source: NOAA

==== Hurricanes ====
The island was struck by Hurricane Flora in 1963. The effects were so severe that they changed the face of Tobago's economy. The hurricane laid waste to the banana, coconut, and cacao plantations that largely sustained the economy, and it wreaked considerable damage on the largely pristine tropical rainforest that makes up a large proportion of the interior of the island's northern half. Many of the plantations were subsequently abandoned, and the economy changed direction away from cash crop agriculture and toward tourism. Hurricane Ivan, while less severe than Flora, also caused significant damage in 2004.

== Government ==
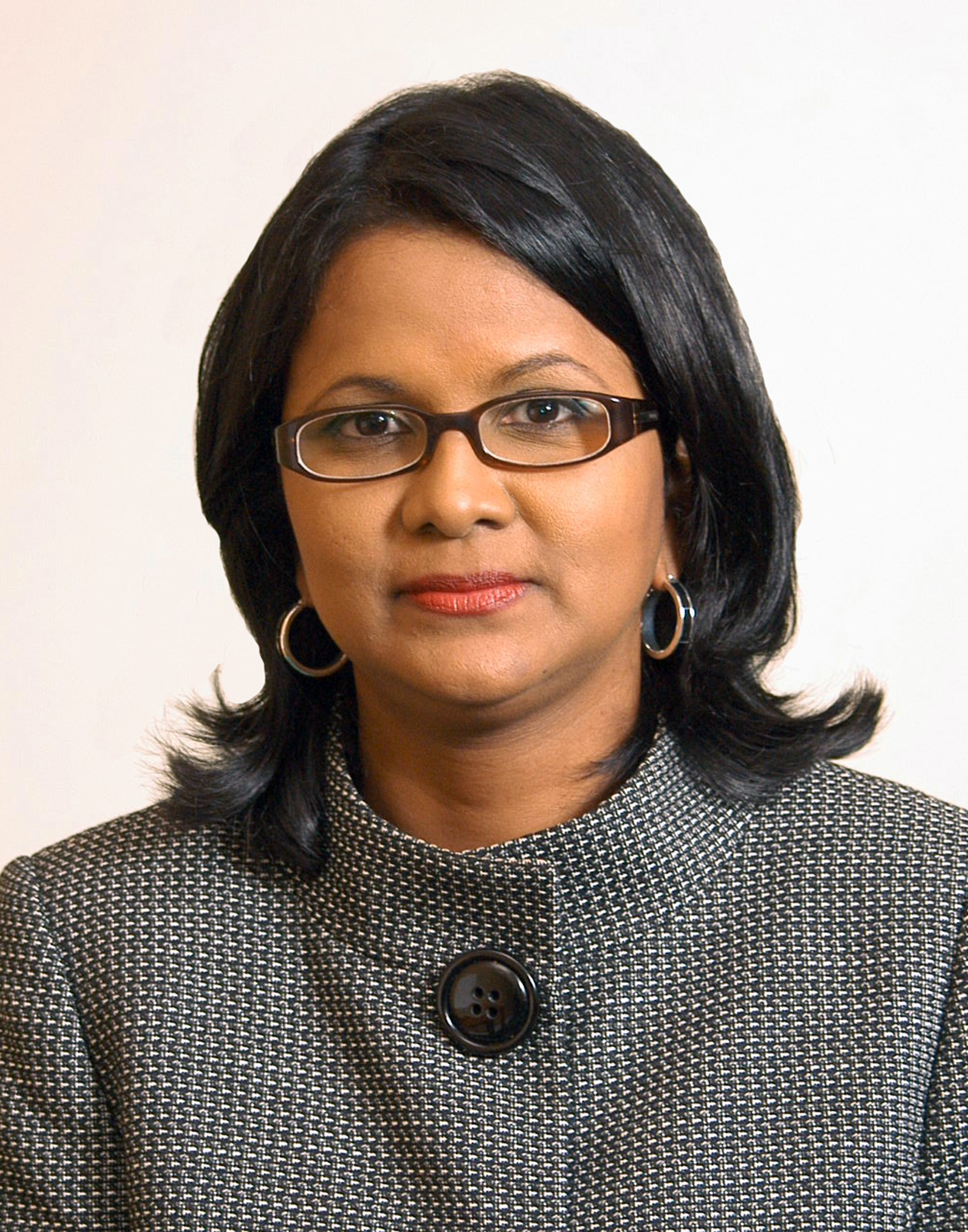
Christine Kangaloo
President of Trinidad and Tobago
since 20 March 2023

Central and local government functions in Tobago are handled by the Tobago House of Assembly. The current Chief Secretary of Tobago is Farley Chavez Augustine from the Progressive Democratic Patriots, which controls 14 of the 15 seats in the Assembly, with the Tobago Council of the People's National Movement led by Ancil Dennis controlling one seat since the December 2021 Tobago House of Assembly election.

Tobago is represented by two seats in the Parliament of Trinidad and Tobago, Tobago East and Tobago West. The two seats were controlled by the Tobago Council of the People's National Movement, which won and retained them in the 2015 and 2020 Trinidad and Tobago general election. In the 2025 general election, held on 28 April 2025, both seats were won by the Tobago People’s Party, ending decades of representation by the People’s National Movement on the island.

This marked the first occasion in which a Tobago-based political party secured both of the island’s parliamentary seats, reflecting a significant shift in the island’s political landscape and strengthening the TPP’s role in national affairs.

=== Districts ===
Historical parishes of Tobago

Historically, Tobago was divided into seven parishes (Saint Andrew, Saint David, Saint George, Saint John, Saint Mary, Saint Patrick and Saint Paul). In 1768 each parish of Tobago nominated representatives to the Tobago House of Assembly. On 20 October 1889 the British crown implemented a Royal Order in Council constituting Tobago as a ward of Trinidad, thus terminating local government on Tobago and forming a unified colony government.

In 1945 when the county council system was first introduced, Tobago was administered as a single county of Trinidad.

In 1980 provisions were made for the Tobago House of Assembly to be revived as an entity providing local government in Tobago. Under the revived system, Tobago is made up of 12 local electoral districts with each district electing one Assemblyman to the THA.

No.	Electoral districts
1	Bagotelle / Bacolet
2	Belle Garden / Glamorgan
3	Bethel / New Grange
4	Bethesda / Les Coteaux
5	Bon Accord / Crown Point
6	Buccoo / Mt. Pleasant
7	Darryl Spring / Whim
8	Lambeau / Lowlands
9	Mason Hall / Moriah
10	Mt. St. George / Goodwood
11	Parlatuvier / L’Anse Fourmi / Speyside
12	Plymouth / Black Rock
13	Roxborough / Argyle
14	Scarborough / Mt. Grace
15	Signal Hill / Patience Hill

== Demographics ==
The population was 60,874 at the 2011 census. The capital, Scarborough, has a population of 17,537. While Trinidad is multiethnic, Tobago's population is primarily of African descent, with a growing proportion of Trinidadians of East Indian descent and Europeans. Between 2000 and 2011, the population of Tobago grew by 12.55 per cent, making it one of the fastest-growing areas of Trinidad and Tobago.

=== Ancestry and ethnicity ===
Tobago racial breakdown
Racial composition	2011
Afro–Trinidadians and Tobagonians	85.2%
Dougla (Indian and Black)	4.2%
Multiracial	4.2%
Indo-Trinidadians and Tobagonians	2.5%
White Trinidadian/Tobagonian	0.7%
Native American (Amerindian)	0.1%
Chinese	0.08%
Arab (Syrian/Lebanese)	0.02%
Other	0.1%
Not stated	2.6%

=== Religion ===
Tobago religious breakdown
Religious composition	2011
Seventh-day Adventism	16.26%
Pentecostalism/Evangelicalism/Full Gospel	14.69%
Anglicanism	12.80%
Spiritual Baptist	10.56%
Roman Catholicism	6.64%
Methodism	4.93%
Moravian	4.56%
Jehovah's Witnesses	1.62%
Orisha-Shango	1.52%
Hinduism	0.67%
Baptists	0.63%
Islam	0.57%
Rastafari	0.39%
Presbyterianism/Congregationalism	0.18%
Other	10.38%
Not Stated	9.83%
None	5.39%

== Economy ==
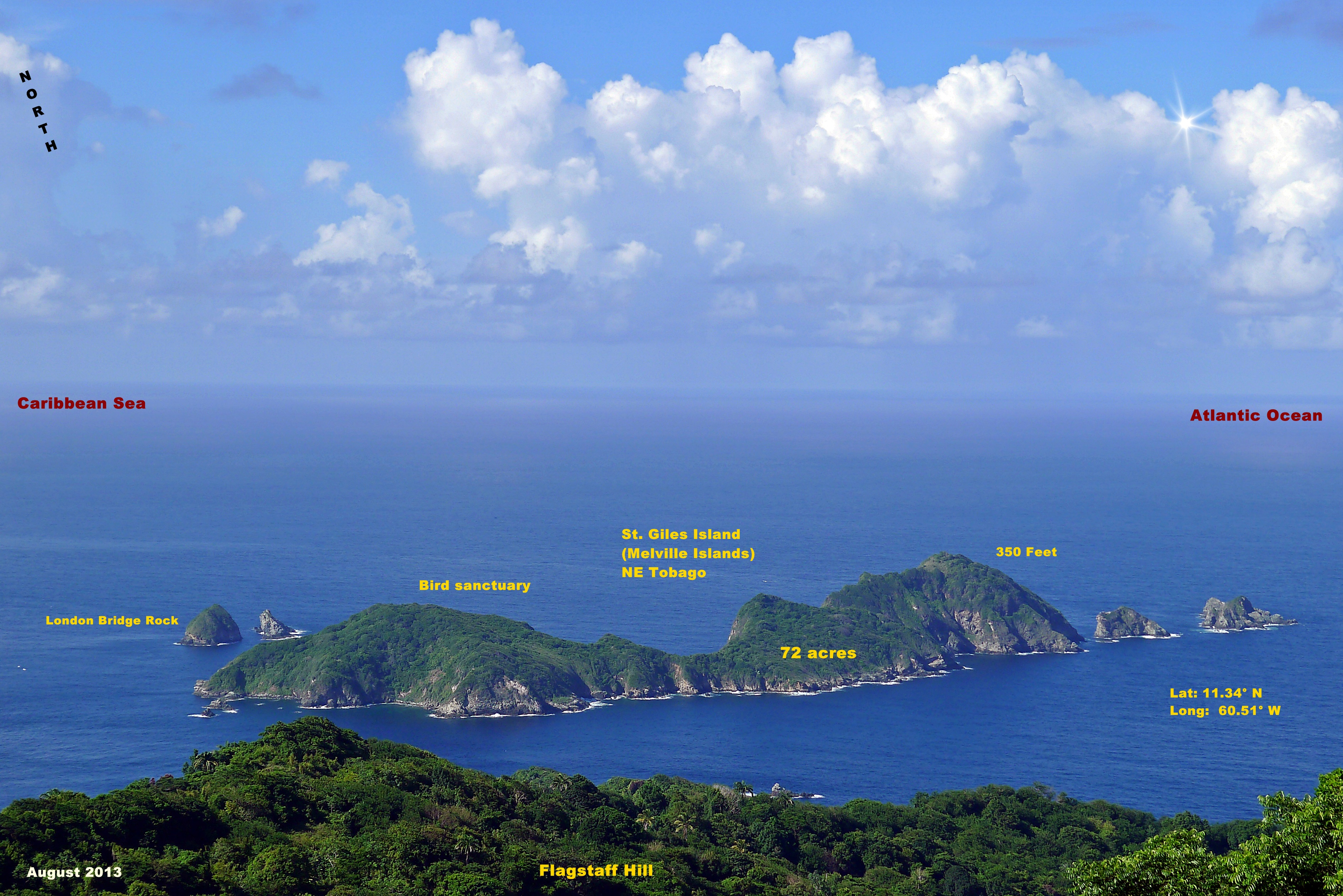
St Giles Island, northernmost part of Trinidad and Tobago, a bird sanctuary

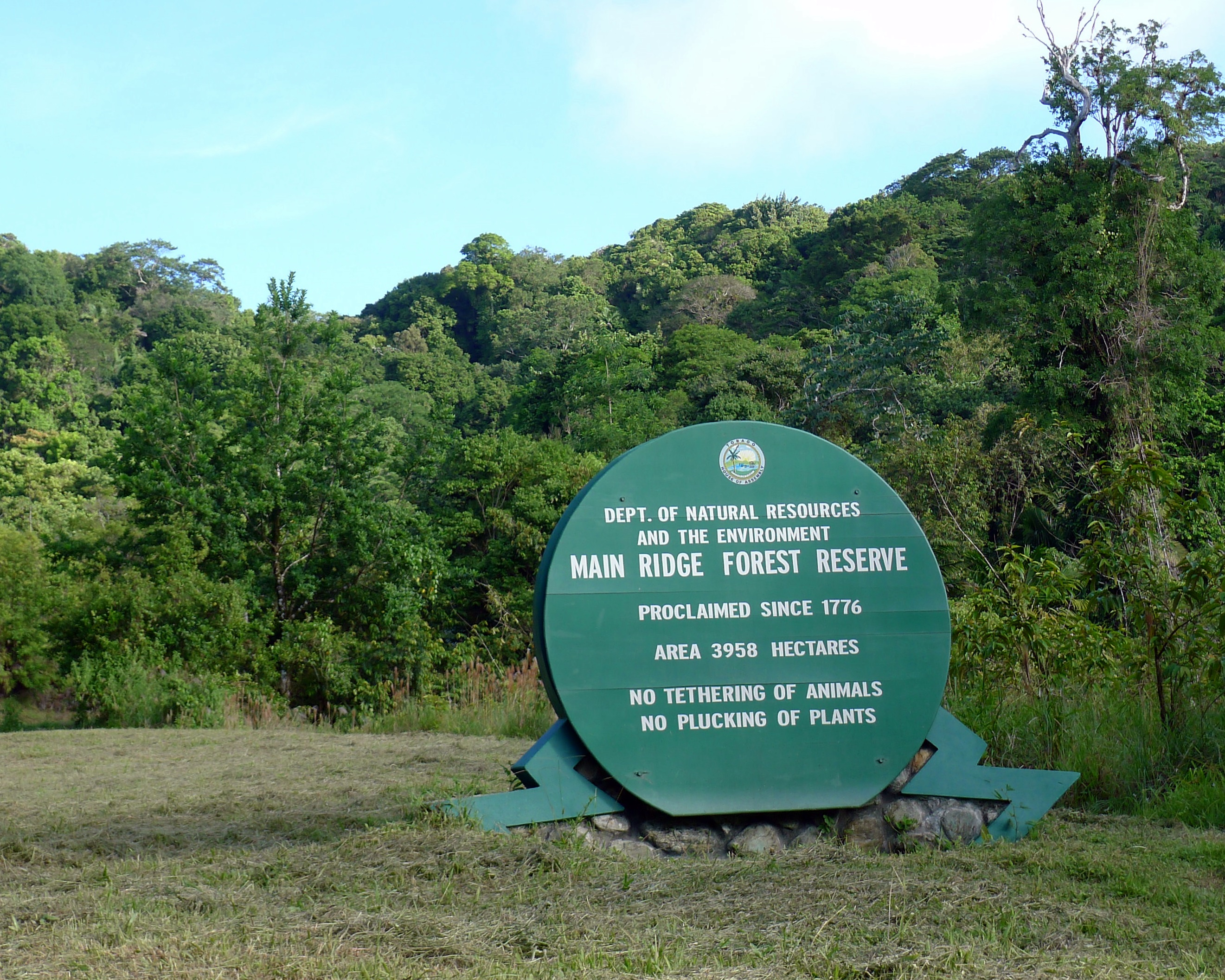
Tobago – August 2013 (1530)

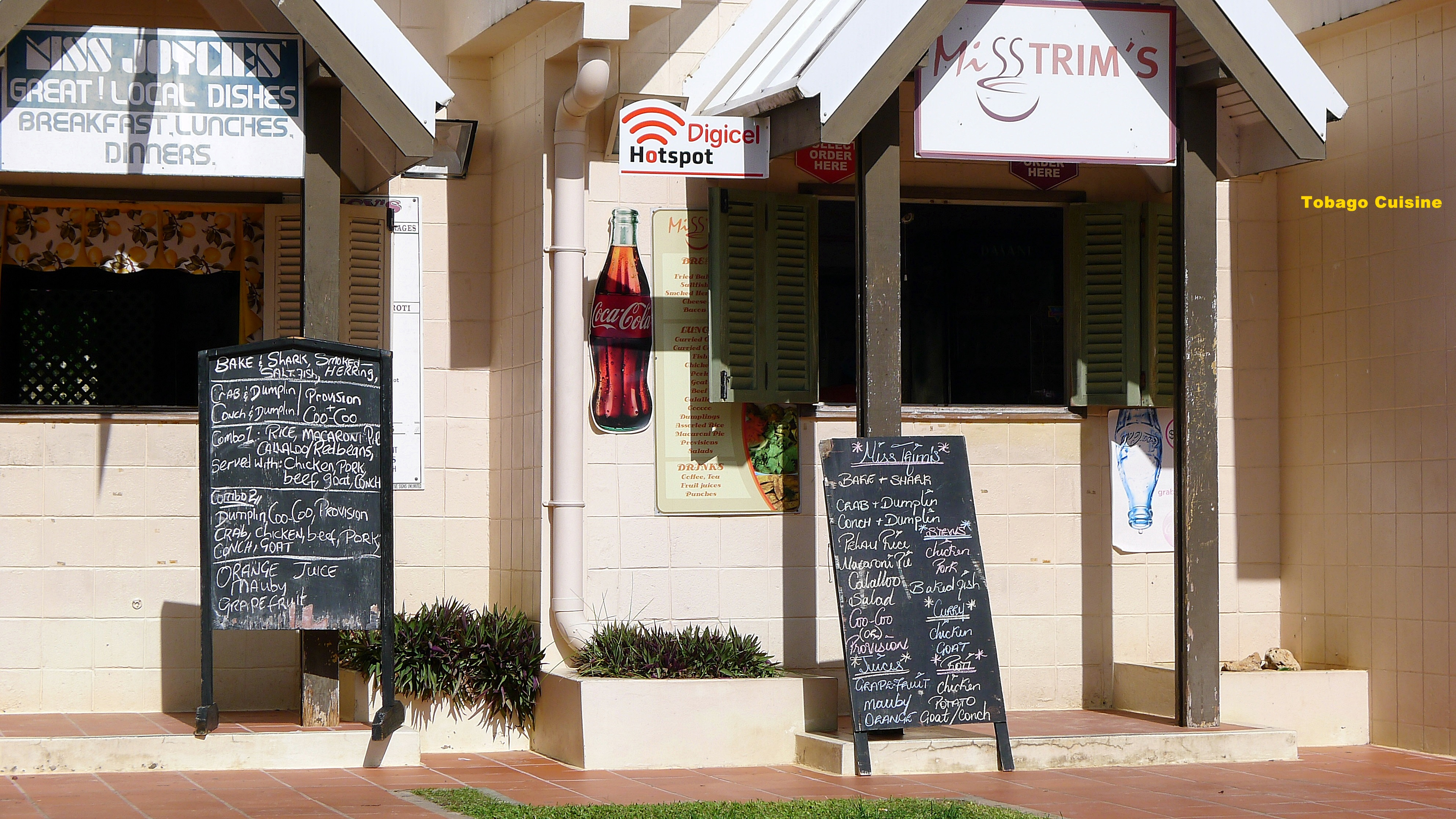
Tobago Cuisine – Crab and Dumplings

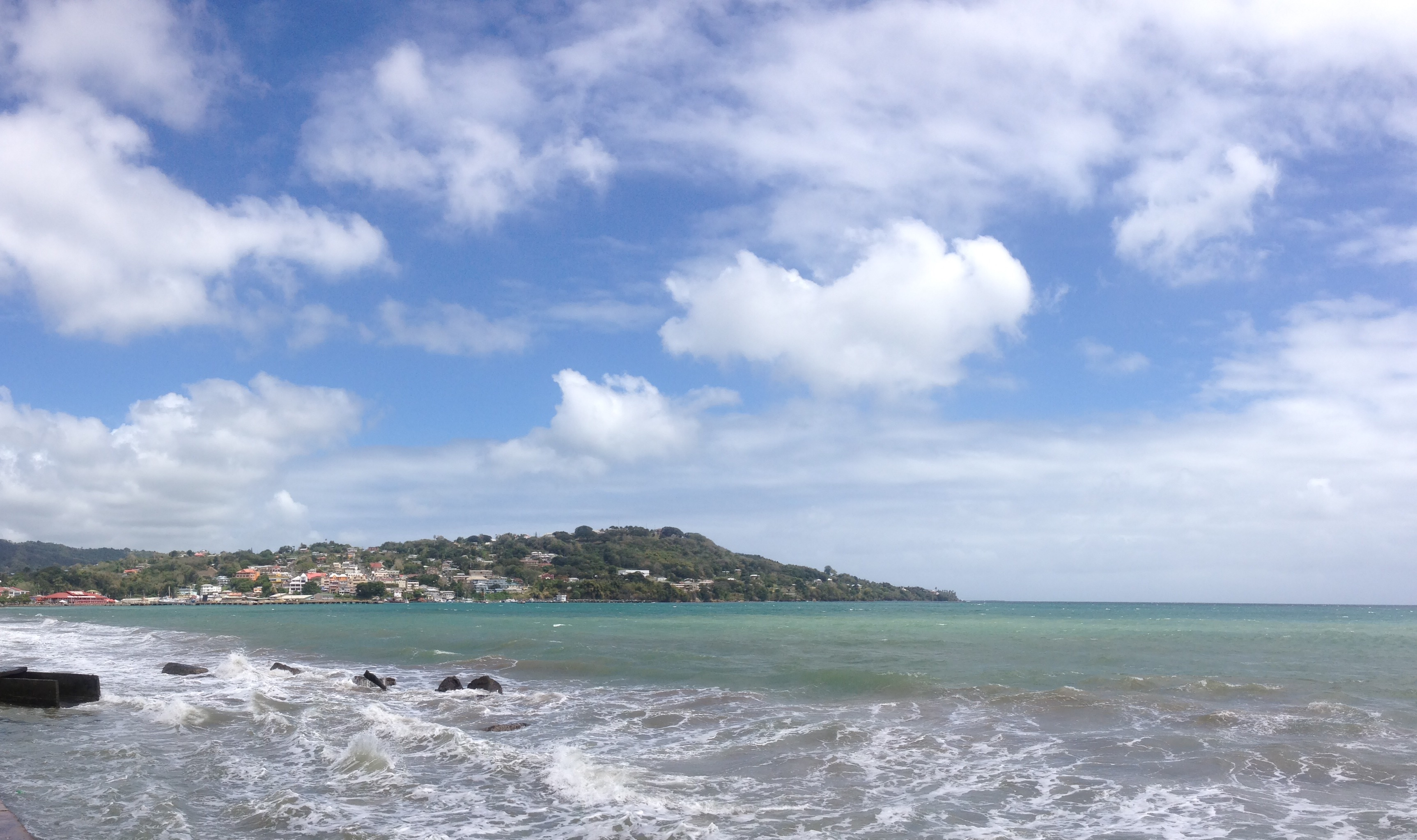
Panoramic shot of Downtown Scarborough, Tobago

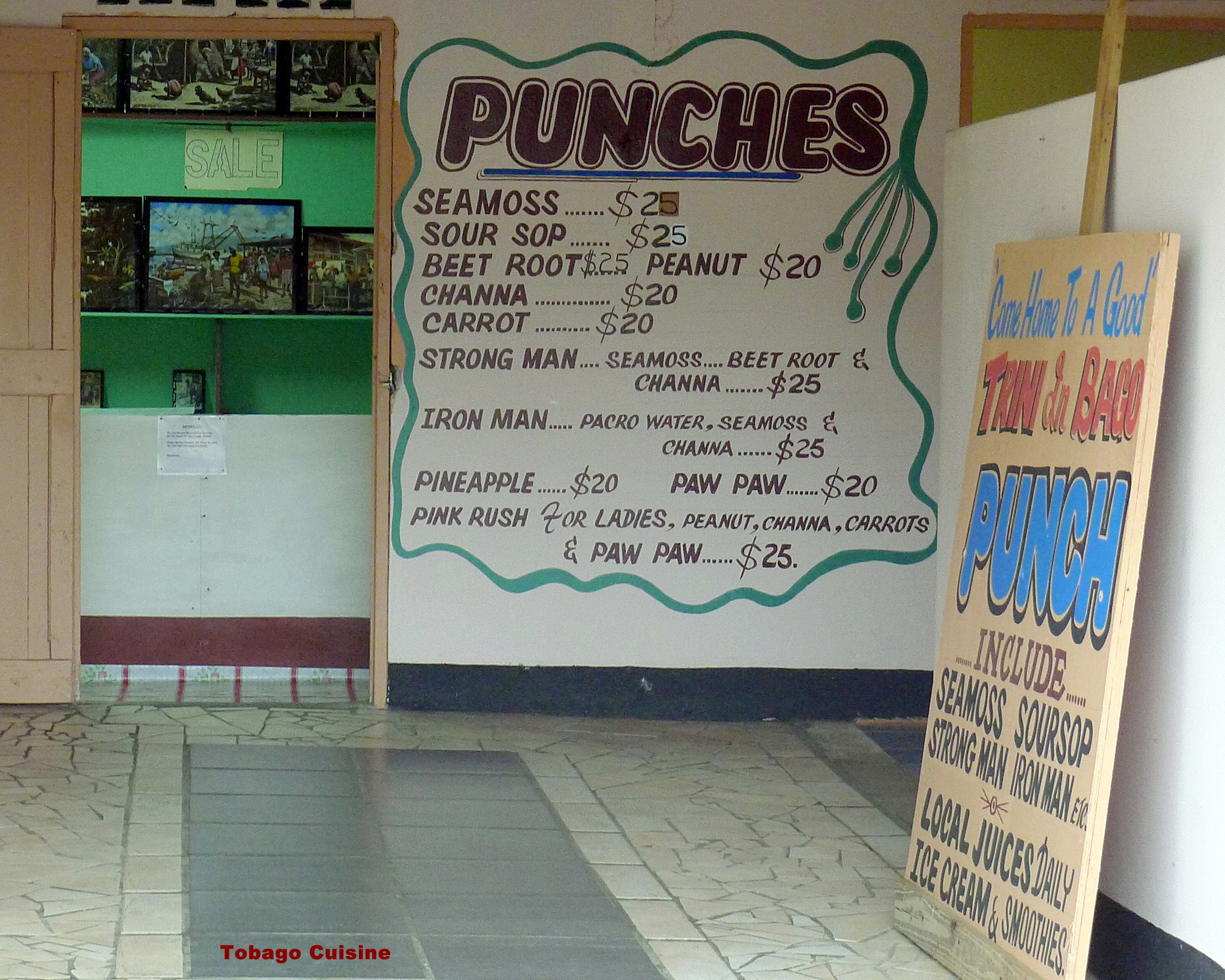
Tobago Cuisine – Pacro Water and Sea Moss drinks

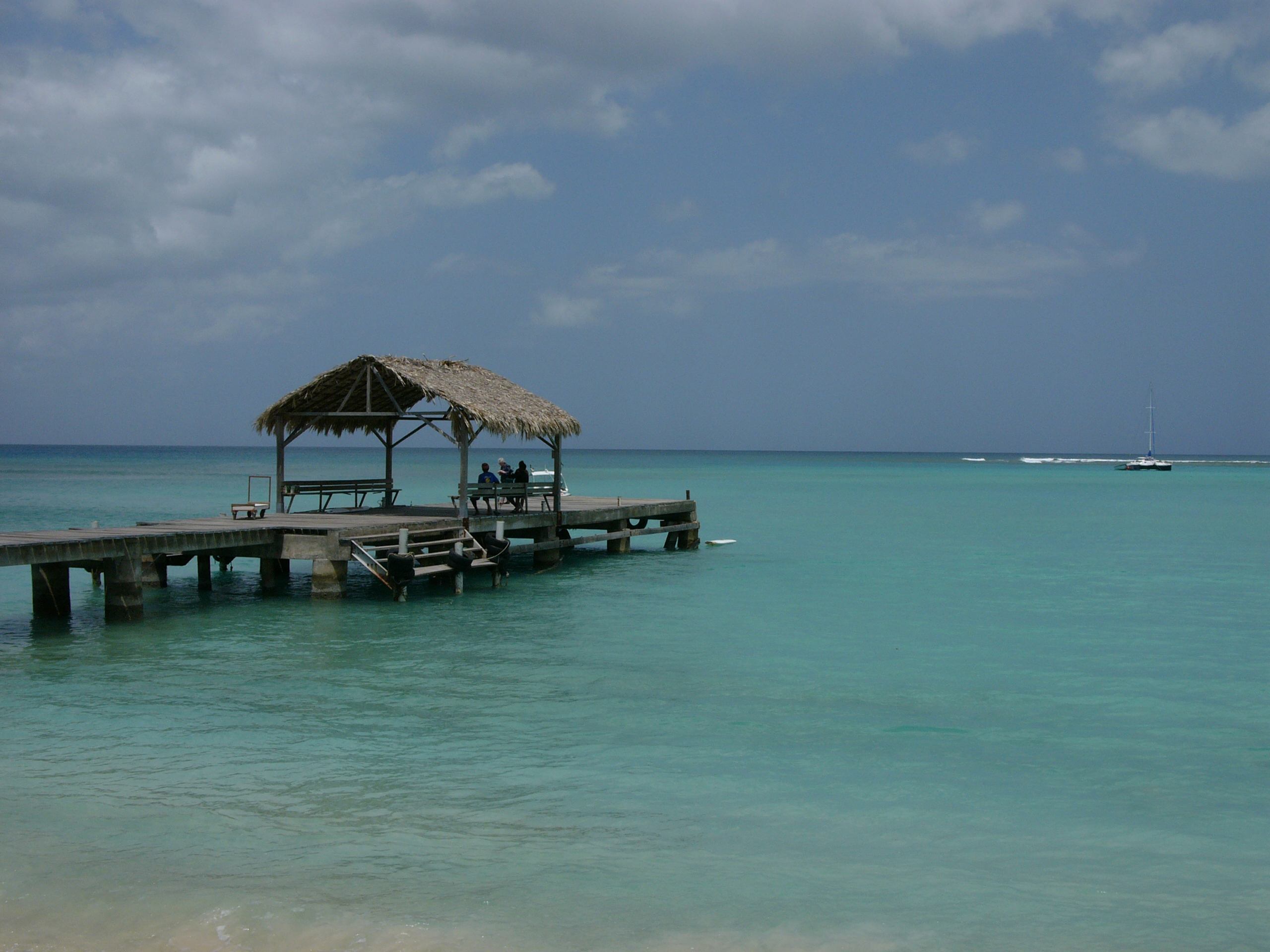
Pigeon Point, Tobago.

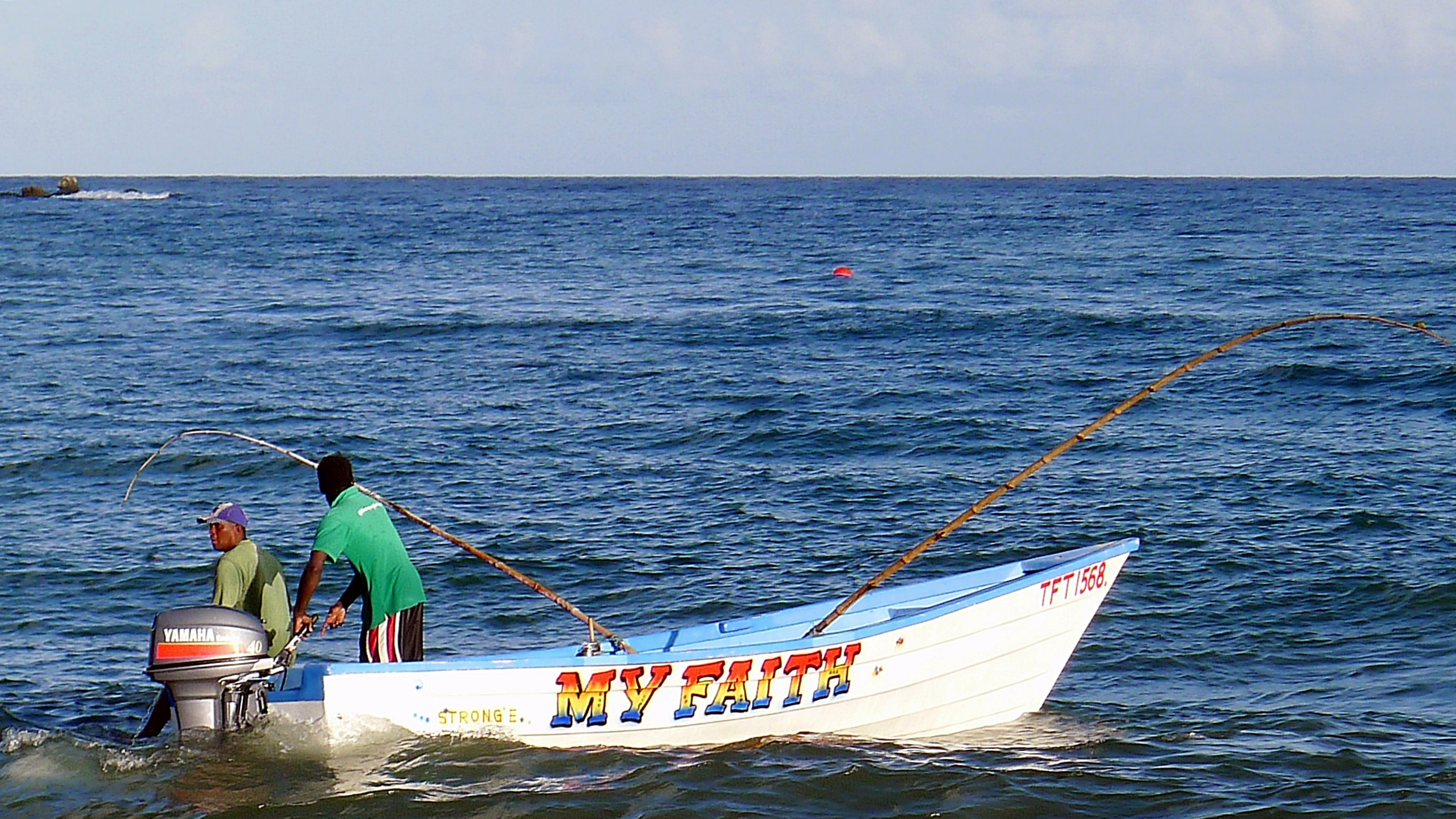
Fishing – Tobago, West Indies

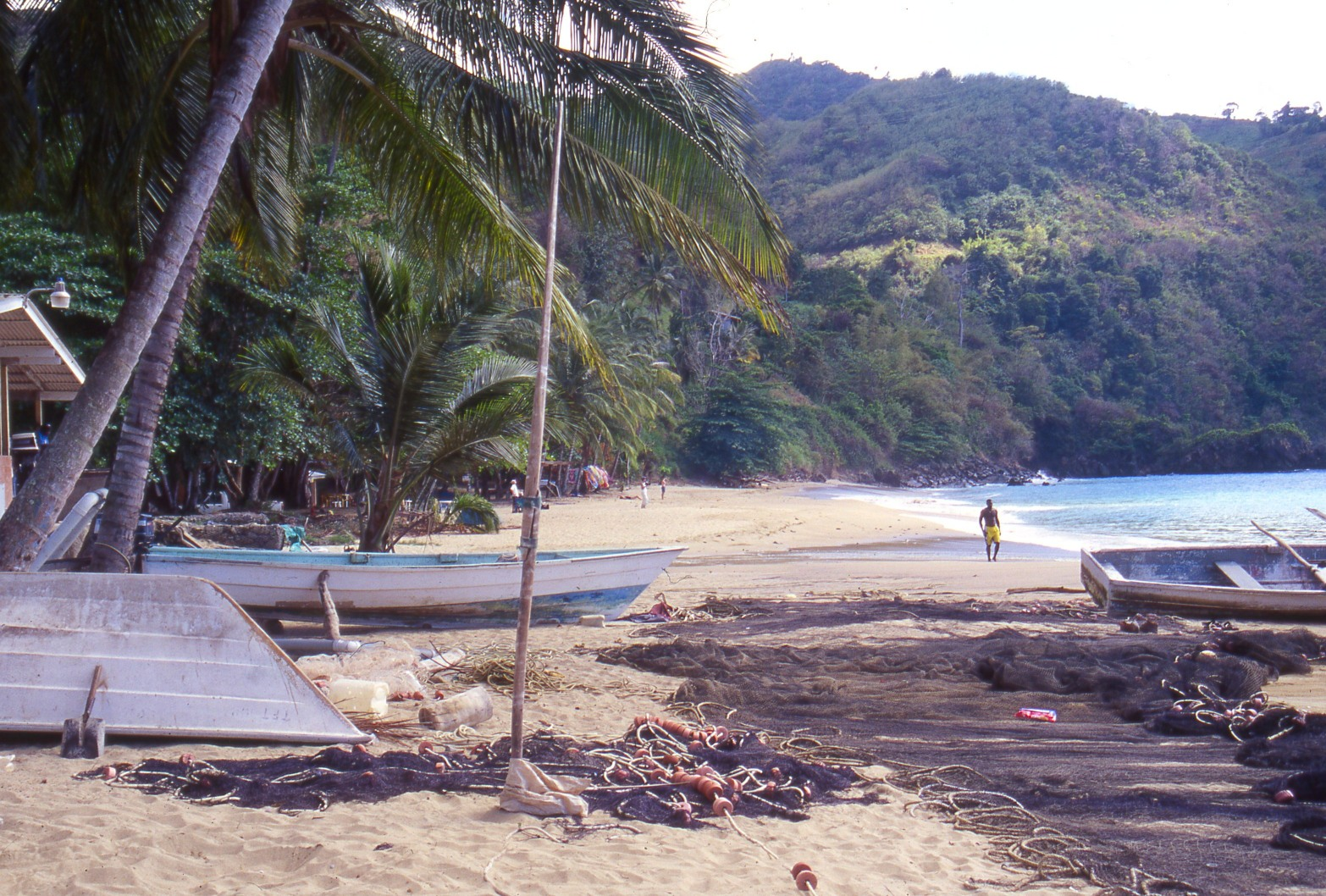
Castara village beach

Tobago's main economy is based on tourism, fishing, and government spending, government spending being the largest. The local governing body, the Tobago House of Assembly (THA), employs 62% of the labour force.

Tourism is still a fledgling industry. Conventional beach and water-sports tourism is largely in the southwest around the airport and the coastal strip. Meanwhile, ecotourism is growing in significance, much of it focused on the large area of protected forest in the centre and north of the main island and on Little Tobago, a small island off the main island's northeast tip.

The southwestern tourist area around Crown Point, Store Bay, Buccoo Reef, and Pigeon Point has large expanses of sand and is dominated by resort-type developments. Tobago has many idyllic beaches along its coastline, especially those at Castara, Bloody Bay, and Englishman's Bay. Tobago is linked to the world through the Arthur Napoleon Raymond Robinson International Airport (formerly Crown Point Airport) and Scarborough harbour. Domestic flights connect Tobago with Trinidad, and international flights connect with the Caribbean and Europe. There is a daily fast ferry service between Port of Spain and Scarborough.

Tobago's economy is tightly linked with Trinidad's, which is based on liquefied natural gas (LNG), petrochemicals, and steel.

=== Diving ===
Tobago is also a popular diving location, since it is the southernmost of the Caribbean islands that have coral communities. Trinidad, which is further south, has no significant coral because of low salinity and high silt content, the result of its position close to the mouth of Venezuela's Orinoco River. Scuba diving on Tobago tends to be centred at Speyside, almost diametrically across the island from the airport.

The island has some of the best diving sites in the Caribbean. There are three wrecks located around its shores, but the one usually considered the best is the Maverick Ferry, which used to travel between Trinidad and Tobago. The ferry is 350 feet (110 metres) long and has been sunk in 30 metres (98 feet) just off Rocky Point, Mt. Irvine. The top of the wreck is at 15 metres (49 feet). The wreck has an abundance of marine life, including a 4-foot (1.2-metre) jewfish, a member of the grouper family. The wreck was purposely sunk for divers, and so all the doors and windows were removed. The waters around the island are home to many species of tropical fish, rays, sharks, and turtles.

=== Golf ===
Tobago is home to two golf courses, both of which are open to visitors. The older of the two is Mount Irvine Hotel Golf Course, built in 1968. It was seen throughout the world after hosting the popular golf show "Shell's Wonderful World of Golf". The course is built among coconut palms and has a view of the Caribbean Sea from almost every hole. Formerly known as Tobago Plantations Golf Course, the recently renamed Magdalena Grand Hotel & Golf Club was opened in 2001 and has hosted the European Seniors Tour on three occasions.

== In art ==
=== Robinson Crusoe ===
Tobago roughly matches the size and location of the island in Robinson Crusoe, described as being located close to Trinidad and the mouth of Orinoco. However, the book is generally thought to be based on the experiences of Alexander Selkirk, who was marooned in the Pacific's Juan Fernández Islands, on the island later named after Robinson Crusoe. On Tobago, there is Crusoe Cave.

=== Swiss Family Robinson ===
In 1958, Tobago was chosen by the Walt Disney Company as the setting for a film based upon the Johann Wyss novel Swiss Family Robinson. When producers saw the island for the first time, they "fell instantly in love". The script required animals, which were brought from all around the world, including eight dogs, two giant tortoises, forty monkeys, two elephants, six ostriches, four zebras, one hundred flamingos, six hyenas, two anacondas, and one tiger.

Filming locations include Richmond Bay (the Robinsons beach), Mount Irvine Bay (the Pirates beach), and the Craig Hall Waterfalls. The treehouse was constructed in a 200-foot tall saman in the Goldsborough Bay area. After filming, locals convinced Disney, who had intended to remove all evidence of filmmaking, to let the treehouse remain, without interior furnishing. In 1960, the treehouse was listed for sale for $9,000, a fraction of its original cost, and became a popular attraction before the structure was destroyed by Hurricane Flora in 1963. The tree still remains, however, and is located on the property of the Roberts Auto Service and Tyre Shop, located in Goldsborough, just off of Windward Road. A local Tobago resident says, "The tree has fallen into obscurity; only a few of the older people knew of its significance. As a matter of fact, not many people know of the film Swiss Family Robinson, much less that it was filmed here in Tobago."

== Ecology ==
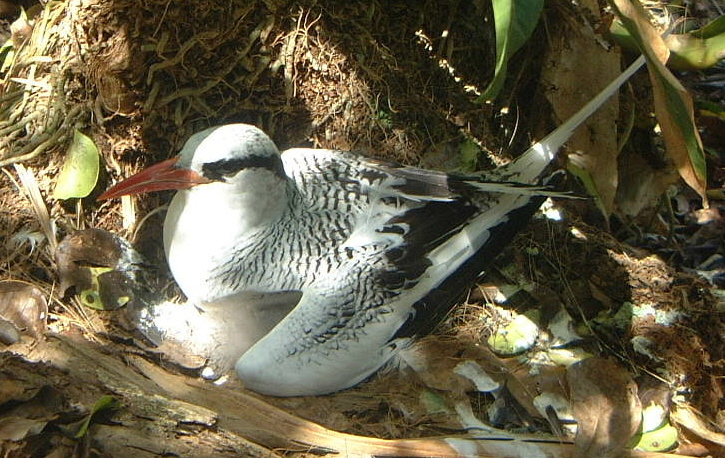
Red-billed tropicbird on Little Tobago.

The Tobago Forest Reserve (Main Ridge Reserve) is the oldest protected rain forest in the Western hemisphere and is biodiverse. It was designated a protected Crown reserve on 17 April 1776 after representations by Soame Jenyns, a member of parliament in Britain responsible for Tobago's development. It has remained a protected area since.

This forested area has great biodiversity, including many species of birds (such as the dancing blue-backed manakin), mammals, frogs, (non-venomous) snakes, butterflies and other invertebrates. Tobago also has nesting beaches for the leatherback turtle, which come to shore between April and July.

The island of Tobago has multiple coral reef ecosystems. The Buccoo Reef, the Culloden Reef and Speyside Reef are the three largest coral reef marine ecosystems in Tobago. These coral reef systems protect the shores of Tobago from eroding.

Little Tobago, the small neighbouring island, supports some of the best dry forest remaining in Tobago. Little Tobago and St Giles Island are important seabird nesting colonies, with red-billed tropicbirds, magnificent frigatebirds and Sargasso shearwaters, among others.

=== Environmental problems ===
Coral reefs have been damaged recently by silt and mud runoff during construction of a road along the northeast coast. There has also been damage to the reef in Charlotteville village caused by sealing the road at Flagstaff Hill and diverting more silty water down the stream from Flagstaff down to Charlotteville.

== Tobagonians ==
- The Mighty Shadow (Winston McGarland Bailey), singer
- Kelly-Ann Baptiste, Olympic sprinter
- Edwin Carrington, politician
- Winston Duke, actor
- Lalonde Gordon, Olympic sprinter
- Makan Hislop, footballer
- Dominique Jackson, model and actress
- A. P. T. James, politician
- Buzz Johnson, publisher
- Wenda Parkinson, model, actress, and author
- Renny Quow, Olympic sprinter
- Keith Rowley, politician
- A. N. R. Robinson, politician
- Calypso Rose (Linda Sandy-Lewis), singer
- Dwight Yorke, footballer
