= List of the first women holders of political offices in North America =

This is a list of political offices which have been held by a woman, with details of the first woman holder of each office. It is ordered by the countries in North and Central American and the Caribbean and by dates of appointment. Please observe that this list is meant to contain only the first woman to hold of a political office, and not all the female holders of that office.

The first female governor in North America and the Americas overall was Beatriz de la Cueva—appointed in 1541, when Central America was part of Spain.

== Anguilla ==
- Minister of Social Services – Albena Lake-Hodge – 1976
- Governor – Christina Scott – 2013
- Premier – Cora Richardson-Hodge – 2025

== Antigua and Barbuda ==
- Parliamentary Secretary of Women's Affairs – Gwendolyn Tonge – 1994
- Member (Cabinet) - Gertel Thom - 2001
- Governor-General – Dame Louise Lake-Tack – 2007

== Aruba ==
- Minister Plenipotentiary in The Hague – Ella Tromp-Yarzagaray – 1991
- Minister of Finance – Ella Tromp-Yarzagaray – 1993
- President of Parliament – Mervin Wyatt-Ras – 2005
- Prime Minister – Evelyn Wever-Croes – 2017

== The Bahamas ==
- Minister of Transport – Doris Louise Johnson – 1969
- Foreign minister – Janet Bostwick – 1994
- Attorney General and Minister of Legal Affairs - Janet Bostwick - 1995
- Governor-General – Dame Ivy Dumont – 2001
- Prime Minister (acting) – Cynthia Pratt – 2005

== Barbados ==
- Minister of Parliament (House of Assembly) – Dame Edna ("Ermie") Bourne – 1951
- Health minister – Billie Miller – 1976
- Governor-General – Dame Nita Barrow – 1990
- Foreign minister – Dame Billie Miller – 1994
- Attorney-General and Minister of Home Affairs – Mia Mottley – 2001
- Leader of the Opposition – Mia Mottley – 2008
- President of the Senate – Sen. Kerry-Ann Ifill – First woman and blind person – 2012
- Prime Minister – Mia Mottley – 2018
- President – Sandra Mason – Inaugural President– 2021

== Belize ==
- Minister of Education and Housing and Social Service – Gwendolyn Lizarraga – 1965
- Governor-General – Dame Minita Gordon – 1981
- Ambassador of Belize to the U.S. - Lisa Shoman – 2000
- Mayor of Belize City – Zenaida Moya – 2006
- Foreign minister – Lisa Shoman – 2007
- President of Senate – Andrea Gill – 2008

== Bermuda ==
- Minister of Health and Social Affairs – Gloria Juanita McPhee – 1968
- Premier – Pamela F. Gordon – 1997
- Governor – Rena Lalgie – 2020

== British Virgin Islands ==
- Attorney General – Paula F. Beaubrun – 1971
- House of Assembly of the British Virgin Islands Members – Ethlyn Smith and Eileene L. Parsons – 1995
- Speaker of the House of Assembly – V. Inez Archibald – 2003
- Governor (acting) – Dancia Penn – 2006
- Cabinet Secretary – Sandra Ward – 2012

== Canada ==
=== National level ===
- Monarch – Queen Victoria – 1867
- Cabinet minister – Ellen Fairclough – 1958
- Governor General – Jeanne Sauvé – 1984
- Prime Minister – Kim Campbell – 1993
- Deputy Prime Minister of Canada – Sheila Copps – 1993

=== Legislature ===
- Member of a provincial legislature – Louise McKinney (Alberta) – 1917 (first female legislator in the British Empire)
- Member of Parliament – Agnes Macphail – 1921
- Senator – Cairine Wilson – 1930
- Speaker of the Senate of Canada – Muriel McQueen Fergusson – 1972
- Speaker of the House – Jeanne Sauvé – 1980
- Leader of the Government in the Senate – Joyce Fairbairn – 1993

=== Political parties ===
- Leader of a political party at the provincial level – Thérèse Casgrain (Parti social démocratique du Québec) – 1951
- Candidate for the leadership of a federal political party – Mary Walker-Sawka – 1967
- Leader of a political party which won an election – Hilda Watson – 1978
- Leader of a political party with seats in a provincial legislature – Alexa McDonough (Nova Scotia New Democratic Party) – 1980
- Leader of a political party at the federal level – Kathryn Cholette (Green) – 1988
- Leader of a political party with representation in the House of Commons – Audrey McLaughlin (NDP) – 1989
- Leader of the Opposition in the House of Commons – Deborah Grey – 2000
- Leader of the Opposition in the Senate – Céline Hervieux-Payette – 2007

=== Individual ministries or regions ===
- City councillor and first woman elected to any political office in Canada – Hannah Gale – 1917
- Mayor – Barbara Hanley, Webbwood, Ontario – 1936
- Secretary of State for External Affairs – Flora MacDonald – 1979
- Minister of Justice and Attorney General of Canada - Kim Campbell - 1990-1993
- Premier of a territory – Nellie Cournoyea (NWT) – 1991
- Premier of a province – Rita Johnston (BC) – 1991
- Premier of a province in a general election – Catherine Callbeck (PEI) – 1993

==== Ontario ====
- Federal Member of Parliament – Agnes Macphail – 1921
- Member of Provincial Parliament – Agnes Macphail and Rae Luckock – 1943
- Deputy Premier – Bette Stephenson – 1985
- Mayor of Toronto – June Rowlands – 1991
- Leader of a political party – Lyn McLeod – 1992
- Leader of the Opposition – Lyn McLeod – 1992
- Premier of Ontario – Kathleen Wynne – 2013
- Speaker of the Legislative Assembly – Donna Skelly – 2025

==== Manitoba ====
- Member of the Legislative Assembly – Edith Rogers – 1920
- Winnipeg City Councillor – Jessie Kirk – 1920
- Federal Member of Parliament – Margaret Konantz (Rogers' daughter) – 1963
- Speaker of the Legislative Assembly – Thelma Forbes – 1963
- Member of the Executive Council – Thelma Forbes – 1966
- First Nations band chief – Jean Folster (as Chief of Norway House Cree Nation) – 1971
- Deputy Premier – Muriel Smith – 1971
- Lieutenant Governor – Pearl McGonigal – 1981
- Leader of a political party – Sharon Carstairs – 1984
- Leader of the Opposition – Sharon Carstairs – 1988
- Mayor of Winnipeg – Susan Thompson – 1992

==== Saskatchewan ====
- Member of the Legislative Assembly – Sarah Ramsland – 1919
- Federal Member of Parliament – Dorise Nielsen – 1940
- Leader of a political party – Lynda Haverstock – 1989

==== New Brunswick ====
- Federal Member of Parliament – Margaret Rideout – 1964
- Member of the Legislative Assembly – Brenda Robertson – 1967
- Cabinet minister – Brenda Robertson – 1970
- Leader of a political party – Elizabeth Weir and Barbara Baird – 1989
- Premier of New Brunswick - Susan Holt - 2024

==== Quebec ====
- Leader of a political party – Thérèse Casgrain – 1951
- Member of the National Assembly – Marie-Claire Kirkland – 1961
- Federal Member of Parliament – Monique Bégin, Albanie Morin and Jeanne Sauvé – 1972
- Leader of the Opposition – Monique Gagnon-Tremblay – 1998
- President of the National Assembly – Louise Harel – 2002
- Mayor of Quebec City – Andrée Boucher – 2005
- Leader of a political party with representation in the legislature – Pauline Marois – 2007
- Premier – Pauline Marois – 2012
- Elected Mayor of Montreal – Valérie Plante – 2017

==== Alberta ====
- Member of the Legislative Assembly – Louise McKinney and Roberta MacAdams – 1917
- Federal Member of Parliament – Cora Taylor Casselman – 1941
- Mayor of Edmonton – Janice Rhea Reimer – 1989
- Leader of a political party – Pam Barrett – 1996
- Leader of the Opposition in the Legislative Assembly – Nancy MacBeth – 1998
- Premier of Alberta – Allison Redford – 2011

==== Nova Scotia ====
- Member of the Legislative Assembly – Gladys Porter – 1960
- Federal Member of Parliament – Coline Campbell – 1974
- Leader of a political party – Alexa McDonough – 1980

==== British Columbia ====
- Member of the Legislative Assembly – Mary Ellen Smith – 1918
- Cabinet minister – Mary Ellen Smith – 1921
- Speaker of the Legislative Assembly – Mary Ellen Smith – 1928
- Federal Member of Parliament – Pauline Jewett – 1963
- Leader of a political party – Rita Johnston – 1991
- Premier – Rita Johnston – 1991
- Leader of the Opposition – Joy MacPhail – 2001

==== Prince Edward Island ====
- Candidate for the Legislative Assembly – Hilda Ramsay – 1951
- Federal Member of Parliament – Margaret Mary Macdonald – 1961
- Member of the Legislative Assembly – Jean Canfield – 1970
- Cabinet minister – Jean Canfield – 1972
- Leader of a political party – Pat Mella – 1990
- Premier – Catherine Callbeck – 1993

==== Newfoundland and Labrador ====
- Member of the House of Assembly of Newfoundland (pre-Confederation) – Helena Squires – 1930
- Member of the House of Assembly (post-Confederation) – Hazel McIsaac – 1975
- Cabinet ministers – Lynn Verge and Hazel Newhook – 1979
- Federal Member of Parliament – Jean Payne and Bonnie Hickey – 1993
- Leader of a political party – Lynn Verge – 1995
- Premier – Kathy Dunderdale – 2010

==== Yukon ====
- Federal Member of Parliament – Martha Black – 1935
- Member of the Legislative Assembly – G. Jean Gordon – 1967
- Leader of a political party – Hilda Watson – 1978
- Premier – Pat Duncan – 2000
- Speaker of the Legislative Assembly – Patti McLeod – 2016

==== Northwest Territories ====
- Member of the Legislative Assembly – Lena Pedersen (Pederson) – 1970
- Federal Member of Parliament – Ethel Blondin-Andrew – 1988
- Premier – Nellie Cournoyea – 1991

==== Nunavut ====
- Federal Member of Parliament – Nancy Karetak-Lindell – 1999
- Member of the Legislative Assembly – Manitok Thompson – 1999
- Premier – Eva Aariak – 2008

== Cayman Islands ==
- Speaker of the National Assembly - Sybil McLaughlin - 1991
- Minister of Education – Sybil McLaughlin – 1996
- Premier – Julianna O'Connor-Connolly – 2012
- Governor – Helen Kilpatrick – 2013

== Costa Rica ==
- Minister of Education – Estela Hernández Quezada de Niño – 1958
- Interior minister – Janina del Vecchio Ugalde – 2008
- President – Laura Chinchilla – 2010
- Minister of Justice - Cecilia Sánchez Romero - 2017

== Cuba ==
- Minister without Portfolio – María Gómez Carbonell – 1942
- Minister of Education – Zolia Mulet y Proenza – 1954

== Curaçao ==
- Commissioner of Health – Maria Liberia-Peters – 1977
- Deputy Governor – Maria Liberia-Peters – 1982
- Governor (acting) – Adèle van der Pluijm-Vrede – 2012
- Governor – Lucille George-Wout – 2013

== Dominica ==
=== National level ===
- Minister of Labour and Social Affairs – Phyllis Shand Allfrey – 1958
- Prime Minister – Dame Eugenia Charles – 1980

=== Individual ministries ===
- Minister of Communications & Works – Mabel Moir James – 1966
- Minister of Home Affairs – Mabel Moir James – 1970
- Foreign minister – Dame Eugenia Charles – 1980
- Defence minister – Dame Eugenia Charles – 1985
- Minister for Health and Social Security – Doreen Paul – 1995
- Minister for Community Development, Women's Affairs and Culture – Gertrude Roberts – 1995
- Minister of State in the Ministry of Tourism with responsibility for festivals/ Minister for Community Development, Gender Affairs, Information and Culture – Loreen Bannis-Roberts – 2005
- Minister for Education, Youth Affairs, Human Resource Development and Sports – Sonia Williams – 2008
- Minister for Culture, Youth Affairs and Sports – Justina Charles – 2010
- Minister for Social Services, Community Development and Gender Affairs – Gloria Shillingford – 2010

== Dominican Republic ==
- Secretary of State for Education, Culture and Public Worship – Lilia Portalatín Sosa – 1964
- Secretary of State for Labour – Altagracia Bautista de Suárez – 1966
- Secretary of State for Industry and Trade – Altagracia Bautista de Suárez – 1970
- Subsecretary of State for External Relations – Licelott Marte de Barrios – 1973

== El Salvador ==
- Minister of Planning and Coordination of Economic and Social Development – Mirna Liévano de Márques Márquez – 1989
- Minister of Foreign Affairs – María Eugenia Brizuela de Ávila – 1999
- Vice President – Ana Vilma de Escobar – 2004
- Mayor of San Salvador – Violeta Menjívar – 2005
- Minister of Health – María Isabel Rodríguez - 2009

== Grenada ==
- Governor – Dame Hilda Bynoe – 1968
- Governor-General – Dame Cécile La Grenade – 2013
- President of the Senate – Margaret Neckles – 1990
- Speaker of the House of Representatives – Marcelle Peters – 1992
- Foreign minister – Clarice Modeste-Curwen – 2014

== Guadeloupe ==
- National Assembly - Eugénie Éboué-Tell - 1945 (First black female member)

== Guatemala ==
=== National level ===
- Governor (Captaincy General of Guatemala) - Beatriz de la Cueva - 1541
- Cabinet minister - Education – Maria Eugenia Tejada Jaureguide de Putzeys – 1980
- President of the Congress - Ana Catalina Soberanis - 1991
- Chief Justice of the Supreme Court - Beatriz de León - 2005
- Police chief - Marlene Raquel Blanco - 2008
- Vice President – Roxana Baldetti – 2012

=== Individual ministries ===
- Minister of Foreign Affairs – Gladys Maritza Ruiz de Vielman – 1994
- Interior minister – Adela de Torrebiarte – 2007
- Attorney General - Claudia Paz y Paz - 2010
- Minister of Public Health – Lucrecia Hernández Mack – 2016

== Haiti ==
- Secretary of State for Women Affairs – Rolande Chandler – 1986
- Minister of Information and Co-ordination – Rosemarie Nazan – 1989
- President (provisional) – Ertha Pascal-Trouillot – 1990
- Foreign minister – Claudette Werleigh – 1993
- Prime Minister – Claudette Werleigh – 1995

== Honduras ==
- Under Secretary of Education – Graciela Bográn – 1957
- Minister of Education – Alba Alonzo de Quesada – 1965
- Foreign Minister – Patricia Rodas – 2009
- Vice President – María Antonieta de Bográn – 2010
- President – Xiomara Castro – 2022

== Jamaica ==
- Minister of Health and Labour – Rose Agatha Leon – 1953
- Prime Minister – Portia Simpson-Miller – 2006
- Minister of Justice and Attorney General - Dorothy Lightbourne - 2007-2011
- Foreign minister – Kamina Johnson Smith – 2016

== Martinique ==
- Member of Parliament - Josette Manin - 2017
- Senator - Catherine Conconne - 2017

== Mexico ==
=== National offices ===
- Member of the Chamber of Deputies – Elvia Carrillo Puerto – 1922
- Subsecretary of Education for Culture – Amalia de Castillo Lédon – 1958
- Secretary of Tourism and first female Secretary of state – Rosa Luz Alegría – 1980
- Secretary of Foreign Affairs – Rosario Green – 1998
- Secretary of Social Development – Josefina Vázquez Mota – 2000
- Secretary of Education – Josefina Vázquez Mota – 2006
- Secretary of Energy – Georgina Kessel – 2006
- Secretariat of the Interior – Olga Sanchez Cordero – 2018
- Secretary of Economy – Graciela Márquez Colín – 2018
- Secretary of Labor – Luisa María Alcalde Luján – 2018
- Secretariat of Security and Civilian Protection – Rosa Icela Rodríguez – 2020
- Elected President - Claudia Sheinbaum - 2024

=== Local and municipal elected offices ===
- First Mayor – Norma Villarreal de Zambrano – Mayor (Alcalde) of San Pedro Garza García, 1967
- Mayor of Monterrey – Margarita Arellanes Cervantes - 2012
- Mayor of Tlaquepaque – María Elena Limón García - 2015
- Mayor of Puebla – Blanca María Alcalá Ruiz - 2008
- Mayor of Tijuana – Karla Patricia Ruiz McFarland - 2020
- Elected Mayor of Tijuana – Monserrat Caballero Ramírez - 2021

=== State elected offices ===
==== Colima ====
- State governor – Griselda Álvarez, Colima – 1979

==== Tlaxcala ====
- Governor of Tlaxcala – Beatriz Paredes – 1987

==== Yucatán ====
- Governor of Yucatán – Dulce María Sauri Riancho – 1991
- (First elected) Governor of Yucatán – Ivonne Ortega – 2007

==== Zacatecas ====
- Governor of Zacatecas – Amalia García – 2004

==== Federal District/Mexico City ====
- Head of Government of the Federal District – Rosario Robles – 1999
- Elected Head of Government of the Federal District – Claudia Sheinbaum – 2018

==== Sonora ====
- Governor of Sonora – Claudia Pavlovich Arellano – 2015

==== Aguascalientes ====
- Governor of Aguascalientes – María Teresa Jiménez Esquivel – 2022

==== Baja California ====
- Governor of Baja California – Marina del Pilar Ávila Olmeda – 2021

==== Campeche ====
- Governor of Campeche – Layda Sansores – 2021

==== Chihuahua ====
- Governor of Chihuahua – María Eugenia Campos Galván – 2021

==== Guerrero ====
- Governor of Guerrero – Evelyn Salgado Pineda – 2021

==== State of Mexico ====
- Governor of the State of Mexico – Delfina Gómez Álvarez – 2023

==== Quintana Roo ====
- Governor of Quintana Roo – Mara Lezama Espinosa – 2022

== Montserrat ==
- Minister of Education, Health and Welfare – Mary Rose Tuitt – 1970
- Governor – Deborah Barnes-Jones – 2004

== Netherlands Antilles ==
- Minister of Health and Environment – Lucinda E. da Costa Gomez-Matheeuws – 1970
- Prime Minister – Maria Liberia Peters – 1984

== Nicaragua ==
- Vice-Minister of Education – Olga Nuñez Abaunza de Saballos – 1950
- Minister of Education – María Helena de Perras – 1974
- President – Violeta Chamorro – 1990
- Interior minister – Ana Isabel Morales Mazún – 2007

== Panama ==
- Vice-Minister of Labor, Social Security and Public Health – Clara González de Berhinger – 1945
- Minister of Social Affairs and Health – Maria Santa Domingo de Miranda – 1950
- President – Mireya Moscoso – 1999
- Interior minister – Mariela Sagel – 1998
- Housing minister – Balbina Herrera – 2004
- Foreign minister – Isabel Saint Malo – 2014

== Puerto Rico ==
- Mayor of Hormigueros (first of any municipality) – Modesta Díaz Segarra – 1932
- Member of the House of Representatives – María Luisa Arcelay – 1933
- Member of the Senate – María Martínez Acosta de Pérez Almiroty – 1935
- Mayor of San Juan – Felisa Rincón de Gautier – 1946
- Assistant Attorney General – Miriam Maria Naveira de Rodón – 1966
- Secretary of Labor – Julia Rivera de Vincenti – 1968
- Secretary of Education – Tania Viera Martínez – 1972
- Secretary of Treasury – Carmen Ana Culpeper – 1981
- Secretary of Justice – Carmen Rita Velez Borras – 1983
- Secretary of State – Sila María Calderón – 1988
- Secretary of Health – Carmen Feliciano de Melecio – 1993
- Governor – Sila María Calderón – 2000
- Chief Justice of Supreme Court – Miriam Naveira de Merly – 2003
- Resident Commissioner – Jenniffer González-Colón – 2017

== Saint Kitts and Nevis ==
- Minister of Women's Affairs – Constance V. Mitcham – 1984
- Speaker of the National Assembly - Marcella Liburd - 2004
- Governor-General - Marcella Liburd - 2023

== Saint Lucia ==
- Minister of Housing, Community Development, Local Government and Social Affairs, Groups Needs, Cooperatives, the Provident Fund and Water – Heraldine Rock – 1974
- Minister of Legal Affairs - Lorraine Williams - 1992
- Governor-General – Dame Pearlette Louisy – 1997

== Saint Vincent and the Grenadines ==
- Minister of Education Culture, Youth and Women's Affairs – Yvonne Francis-Gibson – 1989
- Attorney General - Judith Jones-Morgan - 2001
- Governor-General (acting) – Monica Dacon – 2002
- Governor-General – Susan Dougan – 2019

== Sint Maarten ==
- Minister of Justice - Magali Jacoba - 2009
- Prime Minister – Sarah Wescot-Williams – 2010
- President of the Parliament – Gracita Arrindell – 2010
- Minister of Education, Culture, Youth, and Sports – Rhoda Arrindell – 2010
- Minister of Healthcare, Social Development, and Labor – Maria Buncamper-Molanus – 2010
- Minister Plenipotentiary – Josianne Fleming-Artsen – 2014
- Minister of Tourism, Economic Affairs, Transport and Telecommunications – Irania Arrindell – 2015

== Trinidad and Tobago ==
=== National level ===
- Minister of Government – Isabel Ursula Teshea (People's National Movement) – 1963–1970
- Attorney General – Kamla Persad-Bissessar (United National Congress) – 1995–1996
- Acting Prime Minister – Kamla Persad-Bissessar (United National Congress) – 2000
- Acting President – Linda Baboolal – 2002–2007
- Ombudsman – Lynette Anthea Stephenson – 2006
- Minister of Foreign Affairs – Paula Gopee-Scoon (People's National Movement) – 2007–2010
- Prime Minister – Kamla Persad-Bissessar (United National Congress) – 2010 – 2015
- President – Paula-Mae Weekes – 2018–2023

=== Legislature ===
- Member of Parliament – Isabel Ursula Teshea – (People's National Movement) 1961–1970
- Speaker of the House of Representatives – Occah Seapaul – 1991–1995
- President of the Senate – Linda Baboolal – 2002–2007
- Vice President of the Senate – Christine Kangaloo (People's National Movement) - 2002
- Leader of the Opposition – Kamla Persad-Bissessar (United National Congress) – 2006–2007, 2010, 2015–incumbent
- Deputy Speaker of the House of Representatives – Pennelope Beckles (People's National Movement) – 2007–2010
- Opposition Chief Whip – Marlene McDonald (People's National Movement) – 2010 – 2015
- Leader of Opposition Business in the Senate – Pennelope Beckles (People's National Movement) – 2010 – 2013

=== Regional ===
- City Councillor – Port of Spain – Audrey Jeffers – 1936–1946
- Mayor – San Fernando – Beryl Archibald Crichlow – 1949
- Mayor – Arima – Rose Janneire (People's National Movement) – 1992–1996
- Mayor – Chaguanas – Natasha Navas (United National Congress) – 2009–2010
- Mayor – Point Fortin – Saleema McCree Thomas (People's National Movement) – 2020–Incumbent

==== Tobago ====
- Member of Parliament – Pamela Nicholson (Democratic Action Congress) – 1981–2000
- Secretary for Health, Social Security and Environment (Democratic Action Congress) – Judy Michelle Bobb – 1996-2000
- Senator – Cynthia Alfred (Tobago Council of the People's National Movement) – 1996–2001
- Deputy Chief Secretary of Tobago – Cynthia Alfred (Tobago Council of the People's National Movement) – 2001–2009
- Presiding Officer of the Tobago House of Assembly – Anne Mitchell-Gift (Tobago Council of the People's National Movement) – 2001–2013
- Acting Prime Minister – Vernella Alleyne-Toppin (Tobago Organisation of the People) – 2010
- Acting Chief Secretary of Tobago – Tracy Davidson-Celestine (Tobago Council of the People's National Movement) – 2016
- Leader of a political party with representation in the House of Assembly – Tracy Davidson-Celestine (Tobago Council of the People's National Movement) – 2020–Incumbent
- Leader of a political party with representation in the House of Representatives – Tracy Davidson-Celestine (Tobago Council of the People's National Movement) – 2020–Incumbent

===== Individual ministries =====
- Secretary for Community Development, Youth and Sport (Democratic Action Congress) – Miriam Caesar-More – 1996-2000
- Secretary for Health and Social Services – Cynthia Alfred (Tobago Council of the People's National Movement) – 2001–2009
- Secretary of Education, Youth Affairs and Sport – Anne Mitchell-Gift (Tobago Council of the People's National Movement) – 2006–2013
- Leader of Government Business in the Assembly – Tracy Davidson-Celestine (Tobago Council of the People's National Movement) – 2009–2013
- Secretary for Community Development and Culture – Tracy Davidson-Celestine (Tobago Council of the People's National Movement) – 2009–2013
- Clerk of the Assembly – Vanessa Cutting-Thomas (Tobago Council of the People's National Movement) – 2010–2013
- Secretary of Tourism and Transportation – Tracy Davidson-Celestine (Tobago Council of the People's National Movement) – 2013–2017
- Secretary for Health, Wellness and Family Development – Agatha Carrington (Tobago Council of the People's National Movement) – 2017–2020
- Secretary for Community Development, Enterprise Development and Labour – Marslyn Melville-Jack (Tobago Council of the People's National Movement) – 2017–Incumbent
- Secretary for Tourism, Culture and Transportation – Nadine Stewart-Phillips (Tobago Council of the People's National Movement)– 2017–Incumbent

== Turks and Caicos Islands ==
- Minister of Natural Resources – Arabella Smith – 1991
- Governor (acting) – Cynthia Astwood – 2002
- Premier of the Turks and Caicos Islands - Sharlene Cartwright-Robinson - 2016
- Governor – Dileeni Daniel-Selvaratnam – 2023

== See also ==
- List of elected and appointed female heads of state and government
- List of the first LGBT holders of political offices
- List of the first women holders of political offices in South America
