= Denise Tsoiafatt Angus =

Tobagonian politician

Dr Denise Tsoiafatt Angus

Leader of the Innovative Democratic Alliance
- Incumbent
- Assumed office 2021

Presiding Officer of the Tobago House of Assembly
- In office 2017–2019
- Succeeded by: Vanessa Cutting-Thomas

Personal details
- Party: Innovative Democratic Alliance (since 2021); Tobago Council of the People's National Movement (until 2021)

Denise Tsoiafatt Angus is a Tobagonian politician and medical professional who was the Presiding Officer of the Tobago House of Assembly from 2017 to 2019. Since 2021, she has led the Innovative Democratic Alliance.

== Early life and education ==
Tsoiafatt Angus grew up in Darrel Springs and later in Mt Pelier. She studied for a pharmacy degree at Howard University and a medical degree at the University of Maryland.

== Medical career ==
After university, Tsoiafatt Angus practiced medicine in the United States and Jamaica. She moved back to Tobago in 2004 and served as a medical director and deputy chairman of the Tobago Region Health Authority (TRHA). In 2006, she was appointed chairman of the TRHA, serving in this role until 2008.

== Political career ==
Between 2013 and 2016, Tsoiafatt Angus was the Secretary of Community Development and Culture in the Tobago Council of the People's National Movement (PNM) administration in Tobago. She was also appointed to serve as a Councillor in the Tobago House of Assembly. In 2016, she ran for leader of the PNM in Tobago, coming third with 679 votes or 17% of the vote.

In 2017, she became the Presiding Officer of the Tobago House of Assembly (THA). In November 2019, she resigned from the position in order to contest the 2020 Tobago Council of the People's National Movement leadership election. She was succeeded by Vanessa Cutting-Thomas as presiding officer. In the leadership election, she came fourth with 904 votes or 18% of the vote.

In January 2021, Tsoiafatt Angus was expelled from the PNM following her decision to run as an independent candidate for the Scarborough/Calder Hall seat in the January 2021 Tobago House of Assembly election. She received 269 votes, or 13.4% of the vote.

In August 2021, she launched a political party, the Innovative Democratic Alliance (IDA), serving as its party leader. Tsoiaffatt Angus stood in the December 2021 Tobago House of Assembly election for the new electoral district of Bethel/New Grange, receiving 33 votes (1.5%). She led her party into the 2026 THA election and stood in the Scarborough/Mount Grace electoral district. Tsoaifatt Angus received 14 votes (0.9%).

She also claimed that she did not vote in the 2026 THA election as there were four seats the IDA had chosen not to contest and this included the Black Rock/Plymouth constituency, where she was registered to vote.
