= 2022 Tobago Council of the People's National Movement leadership election =

- April 24, 2022
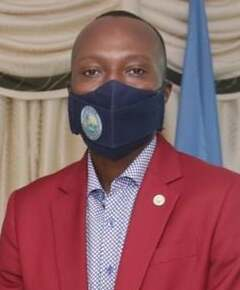
| Candidate | Ancil Dennis |
| Popular vote | Unopposed |
Leader before election
Tracy Davidson-Celestine
Elected Leader
Ancil Dennis

2022 Tobago Council of the People's National Movement leadership election
- Date: April 24, 2022
- Resigning leader: Tracy Davidson-Celestine
- Won by: Ancil Dennis
- Ballots: 1
- Candidates: 1

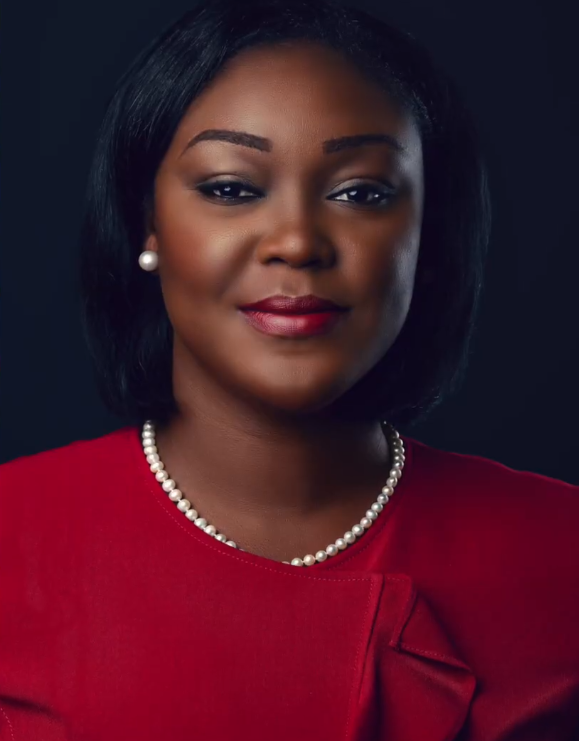
Tracy Davidson-Celestine, outgoing Political Leader of the Tobago Council People's National Movement

Elections for the leadership of the Tobago Council of the People's National Movement were on April 24, 2022. For the second time, a one member, one vote voting system was adopted for all 17 positions contested since being implemented in the last election. The winner automatically became a deputy leader of the PNM at the national level. This election preceded the leadership election of the party at the national level in the 2022 People's National Movement leadership election.

== Background ==
The announcement of an early election for political leader, chairman, vice-chairman and secretary with the election for the other 13 executive positions whose terms ended in January was made on February 10, 2022.

This leadership election follows a rapid decline for the PNM since 2013, with the party losing votes and seats in the 2013 Tobago House of Assembly election under the leadership of Kelvin Charles and the PNM's deadlock result in the January 2021 Tobago House of Assembly election and historic landslide defeat in the December 2021 Tobago House of Assembly election

Under the leadership of Tracy Davidson-Celestine who was elected as the party's first female political leader in the 2020 Tobago Council of the People's National Movement leadership election, she would have made history as the first female Chief Secretary of Tobago, following the defeat was the resignation of five of the party's executives.

== Positions contested ==
All 17 positions on the Executive of the Tobago Council were contested, but 12 candidates were elected to their positions unopposed. The only contested positions were that of chairman and vice-chairman, general secretary, labour relations officer, and youth officer.

| Position | Winner |
|---|---|
| Political Leader | Ancil Dennis |
| Chairman | Learie Paul |
| Vice-chairman | Charles Adams |
| Lady Vice-chair | Kamaria London |
| Secretary General | Akissi London |
| Assistant Secretary | Keston Williams |
| Treasurer | Maxslon Roberts |
| Election Officer | Kurt Wilson |
| Public Relations Officer | Shomari Hector |
| Operations Officer | Ancil Thorne |
| Field Officer | Pete Gray |
| Labour Relations Officer | Kenneth Thomas |
| Welfare Officer | Latoya Horsford |
| Social Media Officer | Monique Perreira |
| Youth Officer | Quincy Trim |
| Research Officer | Aisha McKnight |
| Education Officer | Gerald Brown |

== Candidates ==
Roles in bold were currently held.

=== Declared ===
| Candidate | Last political roles | Announced | Campaign Launched |
|---|---|---|---|
| **Ancil Dennis** | Chief Secretary of Tobago (2020–2021) Tobago House of Assembly Deputy Presiding Officer (2013–2020) Tobago House of Assembly representative for Buccoo/Mt. Pleasant (2013–2022) | 29 January 2022 | |

Potential

| Candidate | Last political roles |
|---|---|
| **Kelvon Morris** | **Minority Leader of Tobago** (since 2021) **Tobago House of Assembly representative for Darrel Spring/Whim** (since 2021) |

== See also ==
- 2022 People's National Movement leadership election
- December 2021 Tobago House of Assembly election
- January 2021 Tobago House of Assembly election
