= Faith B. Yisrael =

Tobagonian politician (born 1978 or 1979)

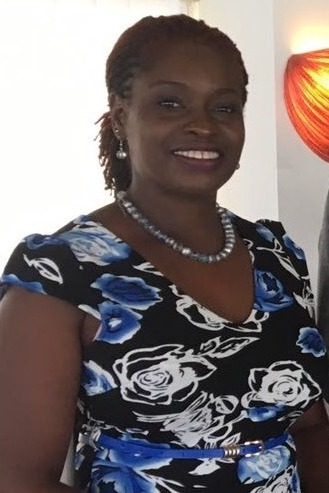
- Yisrael in 2017

Member of the Tobago House of Assembly
- Incumbent
- Assumed office 2017
- Preceded by: Hayden Spencer
- Constituency: Belle Garden East (since 2021); Appointed (2017–2021)
Ministerial offices
Deputy Chief Secretary
Incumbent
Assumed office 19 September 2022
Chief Secretary	Farley Augustine
Preceded by	Watson Duke
Secretary of Health, Wellness and Social Protection
Incumbent
Assumed office 8 December 2021
Chief Secretary	Farley Augustine
Preceded by	?

Personal details
- Born: Faith Brebnor; 1978 or 1979 (age 47–48) Scarborough, Tobago, Trinidad and Tobago
- Party: Independent (since 2022); Progressive Democratic Patriots (2016–2022)
- Spouse: Ben Yisrael (divorced)
- Education: University of Pittsburgh (BS, MPH, DrPH)

Faith Brebnor Yisrael (born 1978 or 1979) is a Tobagonian public health official and politician who has served in the Tobago House of Assembly since 2017. Initially an appointed member of the body, she was elected in January 2021 as a member of the Progressive Democratic Patriots, though she left the party in December 2022 following disagreements with leader Watson Duke.

Since 2022, Yisrael has served as deputy chief secretary and secretary of health.

== Early life and education ==
Faith Brebnor was born in 1978 or 1979 at the general hospital in Scarborough on the island of Tobago. Her mother Lydmoy Brebnor-Dillon was a pre-school teacher, while her step-father Mural Dillon was a bishop in the local Baptist community. She was raised amongst her mother's extended family in the small fishing village of Belle Garden. After attending local schools and graduating from the Roxborough Composite School, Brebnor received a government scholarship to attend the University of Pittsburgh in the United States, where she studied neuroscience. Though she initially intended to pursue a medical track, she decided against it after observing surgeries, and instead pursued studies in public health. After receiving her bachelor's degree in neuroscience, Brebnor remained at the University of Pittsburgh, where she received a master's of public health degree in 2004, and a doctor of public health degree in behavioral and community health sciences in 2007.

Sometime around this period, she married a man named Ben Yisrael; though they would later divorce, she retained his surname.

== Political career ==
=== In the opposition ===
After receiving her doctorate, Yisrael returned to Tobago and began working at the Division of Health and Social Services, where she became interested in health policy. In 2016, she was approached Watson Duke, the leader of the autonomist political party Progressive Democratic Patriots, and was asked to join the party and run as one of its candidates for the Tobago House of Assembly in the 2017 election. Yisrael ran in the Belle Garden/Goodwood constituency against People's National Movement nominee Hayden Spencer, and was defeated by just five votes, receiving 948 votes to Spencer's 953. Despite her loss, she was nominated by Duke to be the PDP's minority councillor. (Note: Four appointed councillors sit in the Tobago House of Assembly; three are nominated by the majority party and one is nominated by the largest opposition party.) Along with Duke and Farley Augustine, Yisrael was one of just three PDP members in the assembly.

While serving as minority councillor, Yisrael argued strongly against the PNM government in Tobago. In 2019, she criticized the government's handling of the island's healthcare system, arguing that mismanagement had led to a lack of diagnostic machines and chemicals. She also questioned the implementation of a tourism plan called Destination Tobago, which did not have benchmarks to assess progress. In the January 2021 election, Yisrael was elected as a full member of the House of Assembly, defeating PNM nominee Boxil Bailey in the Belle Garden/Goodwood constituency, receiving 1,405 votes to Bailey's 1,146. After her election, she was appointed the alternative (shadow) health secretary, and was tasked with critiquing the PNM government's response to the COVID-19 pandemic and the operation of the Tobago Regional Health Authority.

In the lead-up to the December 2021 election, Yisrael was appointed the PDP's deputy political leader. She ran for re-election in the same constituency, which was renamed Belle Garden/Glamorgan, defeating PNM nominee Kenneth Thomas, 1,352 votes to 657. The PDP swept the election, winning 14 of the assembly's 15 seats.

=== In the government ===
After the election, Yisrael was appointed Secretary of Health, Wellness and Social Protection in the new government, which was led by Augustine as chief secretary. Immediately upon taking office, she declared Tobago's health situation "critical" as hospitals were being overwhelmed due to the pandemic. An advocate for increased autonomy for Tobago, she criticized the national government's lack of response to the pandemic on Tobago, and announced her intention to create a parallel healthcare system on the island, working with international partners and establishing a new COVID-19 care facility. Yisrael also announced an effort to reduce vaccine hesitancy on the island through a new vaccination campaign, and advocated for new legislation which would increase regulatory oversight on private healthcare facilities, particularly nursing homes. She is a supporter of LGBT rights, and is a particular advocate for asexuality.

In September 2022, Duke, who was still the PDP party leader, resigned from his position as deputy chief secretary amidst clashes with Augustine. Augustine nominated Yisrael to replace Duke, with the nomination seconded by Megan Morrison. Opposition leader Kelvon Morris of the PNM nominated Duke, but was unable to find an eligible second. (Note: Duke's nomination was seconded by Petal Daniel-Benoit, but because Daniel-Benoit was an appointed councillor and not an elected member, she was deemed ineligible to second a nomination.) As a result, Yisrael became deputy chief minister without opposition, and was sworn in on 19 September 2022. Duke criticized the process as the "most ... ridiculous mutiny".

Following further clashes between Duke and Augustine, Yisrael; Augustine; and 14 other PDP assemblymembers left the party on 1 December 2022, sitting as independents and leaving Duke as the party's only member in the assembly.
