= 2020 Tobago Council of the People's National Movement leadership election =

Tobago Council of the People's National Movement leadership election

| ← 2016 | January 19, 2020 | 2022 → |
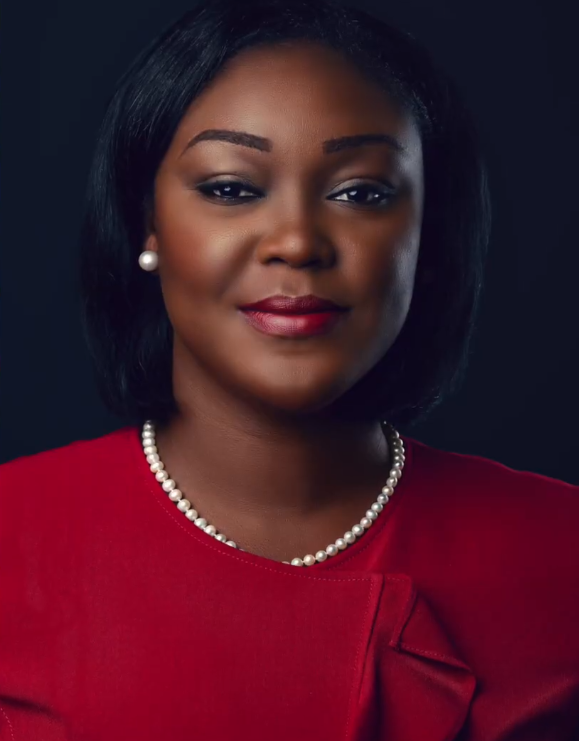

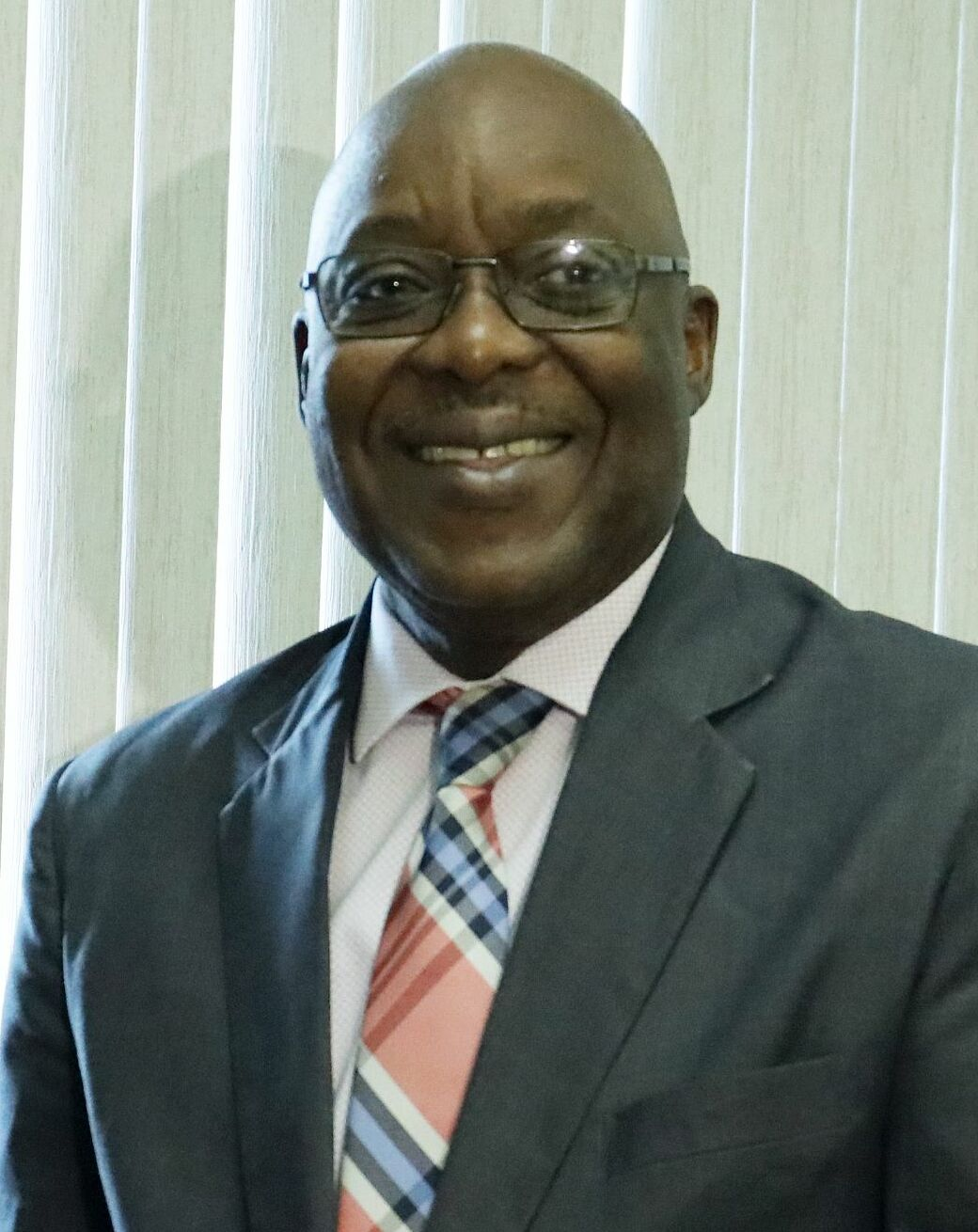
| Candidate | Tracy Davidson-Celestine | Kelvin Charles |
| First pref. | 1,447 (29.4%) | 1,513 (30.7%) |
| Final pref. | 3,150 (60.7%) | 2,042 (39.3%) |
| | JJ | DTA |
| Candidate | Joel Jack | Denise Tsoiafatt-Angus |
| First pref. | 1,066 (18.3%) | 904 (21.6%) |
| Final pref. | Eliminated | Eliminated |
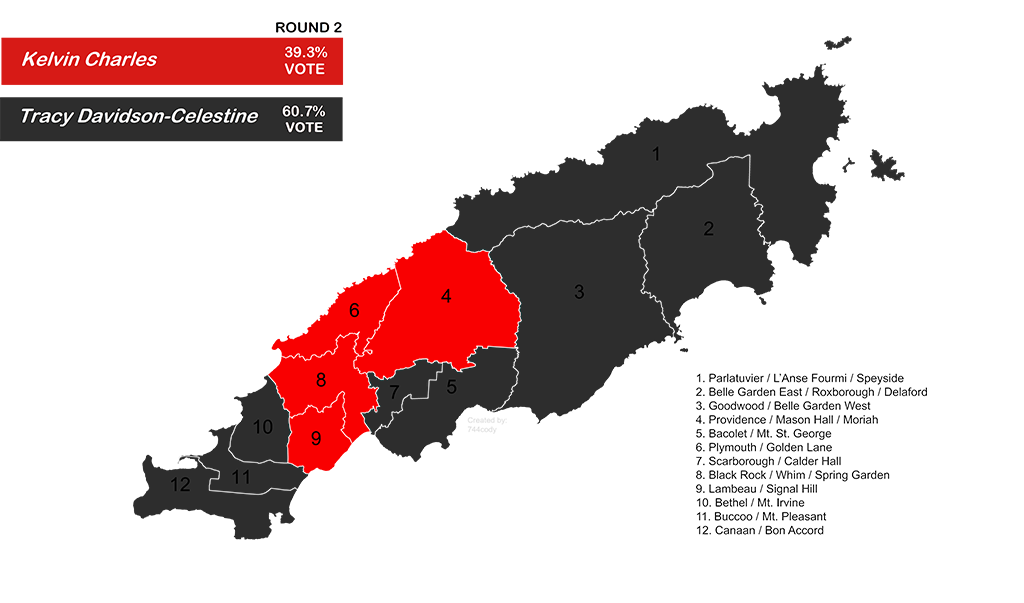
- Results map for the Tobago Council of the PNM's 2020 leadership election, where the following colours denote each respective leadership candidate: Tracy Davidson-Celestine Kelvin Charles
Leader before election
Kelvin Charles
Elected Leader
Tracy Davidson-Celestine

2020 Tobago Council of the People's National Movement leadership election
- Date: January 19, 2020
- Resigning leader: Kelvin Charles
- Won by: Tracy Davidson-Celestine

The 2020 Tobago Council of the People's National Movement election were held on January 19, 2020. For the first time, a one member, one vote voting system was adopted for all 17 positions contested. The winner, Tracy Davidson-Celestine, the first female political leader for the party, will go on to contest the Chief Secretary position of the Tobago House of Assembly in the 2021 Tobago House of Assembly election.

== Background ==
The announcement of the election was made on November 10, 2019 by Chief Secretary of the Tobago House of Assembly and Political leader of the Tobago Council of the People's National Movement, Kelvin Charles while speaking at the PNM's 49th annual convention, Queen's Park Savannah, Port of Spain.

== Positions contested ==
A total of 45 candidates contested the 17 positions on the Executive of the Tobago Council, the winner are as follows:

| Position | Winner |
|---|---|
| Political Leader | Tracy Davidson-Celestine |
| Chairman | Stanford Callender |
| Vice-Chairman | Deon Isaac |
| Lady Vice-Chair | Marslyn Melville-Jack |
| Secretary General | Lynette James-Louis |
| Election Officer | Huey Cadette |
| Public Relations Officer | Kwesi DesVignes |
| Operations Officer | Ancil Thorne |
| Field Officer | Keyon Andrews |
| Labour Relations Officer | Kevern Phillips |
| Welfare Officer | Ricardo Warner |
| Social Media Officer | Tineesia Brebnor |
| Youth Officer | Andre Baker |
| Assistant Secretary | Akissi London |
| Research Officer | Keigon Denoon |
| Education Officer | Kurt Salandy |
| Treasurer | Terrence Henry |

== Declared candidates ==
Roles in bold are currently held.

| Candidate | Last political roles | Announced | Campaign Launched |
|---|---|---|---|
| **Kelvin Charles** | **Incumbent Political Leader** (since 2016); **Chief Secretary of Tobago** (since 2016); **Secretary for Education, Innovation and Energy**; **Tobago House of Assembly representative for Black Rock/Whim/Spring Garden**; Presiding Officer of the Tobago House of Assembly (2013–2016) | - | 5 January 2020 |
| **Tracy Davidson-Celestine** | **Trinidad and Tobago Ambassador to Costa Rica**; Deputy Chief Secretary of Tobago; Secretary of Tourism; Tobago House of Assembly Councillor (2005-) | 13 November 2019 | 8 January 2020 |
| **Denise Tsoiafatt-Angus** | Presiding Officer of the Tobago House of Assembly (2017–2019); Secretary for Community Development and Culture | 9 December 2019 | - |
| **Joel Jack** | **Deputy Tobago House of Assembly Chief Secretary**; **Secretary for Finance and the Economy**; **Tobago House of Assembly representative for Bacelot/Mount Saint George** | 19 December 2019 | - |

== Result ==
Tracy Davidson-Celestine was elected leader in the second round of voting. The result of the election are as follows:

| First round | | | Second round | | |
| Candidate | Votes | % | Candidate | Votes | % |
| Turnout: 49.3% | | | Turnout: 51.92% | | |
|---|---|---|---|---|---|
| Tracy Davidson-Celestine | 1,447 | 29.4 | Tracy Davidson-Celestine ✓ | 3,150 | 60.7 |
| Kelvin Charles | 1,513 | 30.7 | Kelvin Charles | 2,042 | 39.3 |
| Joel Jack ✗ | 1,066 | 21.6 | Eliminated; Endorsed Davidson-Celestine | | |
| Denise Tsoiafatt-Angus ✗ | 904 | 18.3 | Eliminated; Endorsed Davidson-Celestine | | |
| Total | 4,930 | — | Total | 5,192 | — |

Analysis of transferred votes, ranked in order of 1st preference votes
| Candidate | Maximum round | Maximum votes | Share in maximum round | Maximum votes First round votesTransfer votes |
|---|---|---|---|---|
| Kelvin Charles | 2 | 2,042 | 39.3% | |
| Tracy Davidson-Celestine | 2 | 3,150 | 60.7% | |
| Joel Jack | 1 | 1,066 | 21.6% | |
| Denise Tsoiafatt-Angus | 1 | 904 | 18.3% | |

First round
| Charles | 30.7% |
| Davidson-Celestine | 29.4% |
| Jack | 21.6% |
| Tsoiafatt-Angus | 18.3% |

Second round
| Davidson-Celestine | 60.7% |
| Charles | 39.3% |

== See also ==
- 2022 People's National Movement leadership election
