= Tobago Council of the People's National Movement =

- Abbreviation: PNM
- Leader: Ancil Dennis
- Chairperson: Learie Paul
- Secretary: Akissi London
- Leader in House of Assembly: Kelvon Morris (Minority Leader)
- Founded: 1998; 28 years ago
- Headquarters: PNM Tobago Council Office; Robinson Street; Scarborough, Trinidad and Tobago
- Newspaper: MAGNUM
- Youth wing: PNM Tobago East Youth League; PNM Tobago West Youth League
- Women's wing: PNM Tobago East Women's League; PNM Tobago West Women's League
- Membership (2020): 10,000
- Ideology: Liberalism; Social liberalism Nationalism; Centralization
- Political position: Centre to centre-left
- National affiliation: People's National Movement
- Regional affiliation: West Indies Federal Labour Party (1957–1962)
- Colors: Red
- Senate: 3 / 31
- House of Representatives: 0 / 2
- Tobago House of Assembly: 0 / 15

Election symbol
- Balisier flower

Website
- tobagopnm.com

The Tobago Council of the People's National Movement, also known as the Tobago Council of the PNM, PNM Tobago or PNM Tobago Council, is the longest-serving and oldest active political party in Tobago. The party is the autonomous branch of the Trinidad and Tobago People's National Movement operating in Tobago. While its political leader acts in the local capacity, they also serve as a deputy leader on a national level. The party's executives organize for both local and national election campaigns. There have been three PNM Chief Secretaries and administrations.

Founded in 1998, it is the largest and most successful political party in modern Tobagonian politics. With the exception of 2010, the party has won the biggest share of the vote at the Trinidad and Tobago general elections since 2000 and has governed the Tobago House of Assembly uninterruptedly, winning every Tobago House of Assembly election from 2001 until 2021.

The Tobago PNM currently hold 2 of 2 Tobagonian seats in the Trinidad and Tobago Parliament and 1 of 15 seats in the Tobago House of Assembly (THA). Former Chief Secretary Ancil Dennis is the current and youngest political leader of the PNM after being elected unopposed in the 2020 People's National Movement Tobago leadership election with Kelvon Morris, the party's lone elected assemblymember serving as the party's leader in the THA.

With its predecessor organizations and despite not being a socialist party, it was a member of the democratic socialist West Indies Federal Labour Party in the Federal Parliament of the West Indies Federation from 1957 to 1962, winning the Tobago seat in the 1958 elections.

As of January 2020, the party has roughly 10,000 registered members.

Following the 2026 Tobago House of Assembly election, the party was left with no elected members of the Tobago House of Assembly.

== Elected representatives (current) ==
=== Parliament of Trinidad and Tobago ===
==== Members of the Senate ====
Member of Parliament	Appointed
Lawrence Hislop	22 March 2022
Nigel de Freitas	23 September 2015
Hassel Bacchus	19 August 2020

=== Tobago House of Assembly ===
Member of the Tobago House of Assembly	Electoral District
Kelvon Morris	Darrel Spring/Whim

=== Notable party members ===
Member	Position
A. N. R. Robinson	Member of Parliament for Tobago East (1961–1976)
Keith Rowley	Candidate for Tobago West (1981)
Tracy Davidson-Celestine	First female political leader (2020–2022) Assemblymember for Lambeau/Signal Hill (2021)

== Electoral performance ==
=== West Indies ===
Election	Party Group	Leader	Votes		Seats		Position	Government
Election	Party Group	Leader	No.	Share	No.	Share	Position	Government
1958	WIFLP	Eric Williams (National party leader)	6,626	62.2%	1 / 1	100.0%	1st	WIFLP

=== Trinidad and Tobago general elections ===
Election	Party leader	Votes			Seats		Position	Government
Election	Party leader	No.	%	±	No.	±	Position	Government
1956	Eric Williams (National party leader)	5,529	47.54%		0 / 1	Steady	2nd	PNM
1961	Eric Williams (National party leader)	8,208	68.67%	▲21.13	2 / 2	▲2	▲1st	PNM
1966	Eric Williams (National party leader)	?	?	?	2 / 2	Steady	1st	PNM
1971	Eric Williams (National party leader)	2,675	90.65%	?	2 / 2	Steady	1st	PNM
1976	Eric Williams (National party leader)	5,933	42.41%	▼48.24	0 / 2	▼2	▼2nd	PNM
1981	George Chambers (National party leader)	7,503	42.66%	▲0.25	0 / 2	Steady	2nd	PNM
1986	George Chambers (National party leader)	6,357	31.90%	▼10.76	0 / 2	Steady	2nd	NAR
1991	Patrick Manning (National party leader)	5,622	30.08%	▼1.82	0 / 2	Steady	2nd	PNM
1995	Patrick Manning (National party leader)	6,949	36.80%	▲6.72	0 / 2	Steady	2nd	UNC–NAR
2000	Orville London	8,672	47.46%	▲10.66	1 / 2	▲1	▲ Tie	UNC
2001	Orville London	11,225	61.38%	▲13.92	2 / 2	▲1	▲1st	PNM Minority
2002	Orville London	13,432	65.75%	▲4.37	2 / 2	Steady	1st	PNM
2007	Orville London	12,534	55.26%	▼10.49	2 / 2	Steady	1st	PNM
2010	Orville London	12,305	44.09%	▼11.17	0 / 2	▼2	▼2nd	PP
2015	Orville London	18,560	74.34%	▲30.25	2 / 2	▲2	▲1st	PNM
2020	Tracy Davidson-Celestine	16,402	60.76%	▼13.58	2 / 2	Steady	1st	PNM
2025	Ancil Dennis				0 / 2	▼2	▼2nd	UNC

=== Tobago County Council ===
Election	Leaders	Votes			Seats		Position	Control
Election	Leaders	No.	%	±	No.	±	Position	Control
1959	Eric Williams (National party leader)	8,285	53.4	Steady	11 / 14	Steady	1st	PNM
1968	Eric Williams (National party leader)	?	?	?	10 / 11	▼1	1st	PNM
1971	Eric Williams (National party leader)	N/A	N/A	N/A	11 / 11	▲1	1st	PNM
1977	Eric Williams (National party leader)	6,326	52.6	N/A	7 / 11	▼4	1st	PNM

=== Tobago House of Assembly ===
Election	Leaders	Votes			Seats		Position	Government
Election	Leaders	No.	%	±	No.	±	Position	Government
1980	Eric Williams (National party leader)	7,097	44.4		4 / 12		2nd	DAC
1984	George Chambers (National party leader)	8,200	41.4	▼3.0	1 / 12	▼3	2nd	DAC
1988	Patrick Manning (National party leader)	5,977	35.8	▼5.6	1 / 12	Steady	2nd	DAC
1992	Patrick Manning (National party leader)	6,555	36.7	▲0.9	1 / 12	Steady	2nd	NAR
1996	Patrick Manning (National party leader)	5,023	33.6	▼4.1	1 / 12	Steady	2nd	NAR
2001	Orville London	10,500	46.7	▲13.3	8 / 12	▲7	▲1st	PNM
2005	Orville London	12,137	58.4	▲11.7	11 / 12	▲3	1st	PNM
2009	Orville London	12,311	51.2	▼7.2	8 / 12	▼3	1st	PNM
2013	Orville London	19,976	61.2	▲10.0	12 / 12	▲4	1st	PNM
2017	Kelvin Charles	13,310	54.7	▼6.5	10 / 12	▼2	1st	PNM
January 2021	Tracy Davidson-Celestine	13,288	50.4	▼4.3	6 / 12	▼4	1st	Caretaker
December 2021	Tracy Davidson-Celestine	11,943*	40.8*	▼9.6*	1 / 15	▼5	▼2nd	PDP

== Leaders ==
The leaders of the People's National Movement Tobago Council who additionally serve as deputy leaders of the party nationally have been as follows (any acting leaders indicated in italics):

Key: PNM PDP TPP MaL: Majority Leader MiL: Minority Leader

Leader		Term		Position	Chief Secretary
1	Orville London	2001	3 July 2016	MaL 2001–2017	himself
2	Kelvin Charles	3 July 2016	26 January 2020	MaL 2017–2020	himself
3	Tracy Davidson-Celestine	26 January 2020 (Elected)	1 May 2022	None	Kelvin Charles
3	Tracy Davidson-Celestine	26 January 2020 (Elected)	1 May 2022	None	Ancil Dennis
3	Tracy Davidson-Celestine	26 January 2020 (Elected)	1 May 2022	None	Augustine
4	Ancil Dennis	1 May 2022 (Elected)		None	Augustine

== Executive positions ==
These are the positions currently held by the Executive of the PNM Tobago Council:

Position	Officeholder
Political Leader	Ancil Dennis
Chairperson	Learie Paul
Vice-Chairperson	Charles Adams
Lady Vice-Chairperson	Kamaria London
General Secretary	Akissi London
Election Officer	Kurt Wilson
Public Relations Officer	Shomari Hector
Operations Officer	Ancil Thorne
Field Officer	Pete Gray
Labour Relations Officer	Kenneth Thomas
Welfare Officer	Latoya Horsford
Social Media Officer	Monique Perreira
Youth Officer	Quincy Trim
Assistant General Secretary	Keston Williams
Research Officer	Aisha McKnight
Education Officer	Gerald Brown
Treasurer	Maxslon Roberts

== See also ==
- People's National Movement
- 2020 Tobago Council of the People's National Movement leadership election
- Chief Secretary of Tobago
- Presiding Officer of the Tobago House of Assembly
- 2022 People's National Movement leadership election
- List of political parties in Trinidad and Tobago
