= 2001 Tobago House of Assembly election =

- 29 January 2001

All 12 seats in the Tobago House of Assembly 7 seats needed for a majority
- Turnout: 60.13% (▲16.23pp)
| | First party | Second party |
|---|---|---|
| | PNM | NAR |
| Leader | Orville London | Hochoy Charles |
| Party | PNM | NAR |
| Leader since | 1998 |
| Leader's seat | Scarborough/Calder Hall | Standing in Plymouth/Golden Lane |
| Last election | 33.64%, 1 seat | 60.10%, 10 seats |
| Seats won | 8 / 12 | 4 / 12 |
| Seat change | ▲7 | ▼6 |
| Popular vote | 12,137 | 8,637 |
| Percentage | 46.73% | 38.44% |
| Swing | ▲13.09pp | ▼21.66pp |
Chief Secretary before election
Hochoy Charles
NAR
Elected Chief Secretary
Orville London
PNM

House of Assembly elections were held in Tobago on 29 January 2001 to elect the twelve members of the Tobago House of Assembly. The Tobago Council of the People's National Movement won eight seats with 46.73% of the vote, while the governing National Alliance for Reconstruction won four seats with 38.44% of the vote. This election is the only time to date that the United National Congress participated in an election in Tobago.

== Results ==
| Party | Votes | % | +/– | Seats | +/– |
|---|---|---|---|---|---|
| Tobago Council of the People's National Movement | 10,500 | 46.73 | +13.09 | 8 | +7 |
| National Alliance for Reconstruction | 8,637 | 38.44 | –21.66 | 4 | –6 |
| United National Congress | 1,757 | 7.82 | New | 0 | New |
| People's Empowerment Party | 1,575 | 7.01 | New | 0 | New |
| Total | 22,469 | 100.00 | – | 12 | 0 |
| Valid votes | 22,469 | 99.34 | | | |
| Invalid/blank votes | 150 | 0.66 | | | |
| Total votes | 22,619 | 100.00 | | | |
| Registered voters/turnout | 37,616 | 60.13 | | | |
Source: EBC
