= 2005 Tobago House of Assembly election =

- 17 January 2005

All 12 seats in the Tobago House of Assembly 7 seats needed for a majority
- Turnout: 54.43% (▼5.70 pp)
	First party	Second party
	PNM	DAC
Leader	Orville London	Hochoy Charles
Party	PNM	DAC
Leader since	1998	2005
Leader's seat	Scarborough/Calder Hall	Plymouth/Golden Lane (lost)
Last election	46.73%, 8 seats	–
Seats won	11 / 12	1 / 12
Seat change	▲3	New party
Popular vote	12,137	8,453
Percentage	58.02%	40.41%
Swing	▲11.29pp	New party
Chief Secretary before election
Orville London
PNM
Elected Chief Secretary
Orville London
PNM

House of Assembly elections were held in Tobago on 17 January 2005 to elect the twelve members of the Tobago House of Assembly. The Tobago Council of the People's National Movement won 11 seats with 58.02% of the vote, while the Democratic Action Congress won one seat with 40.41% of the vote.

== Results ==
Party	Votes	%	+/–	Seats	+/–
Tobago Council of the People's National Movement	12,137	58.02	+11.29	11	+3
Democratic Action Congress	8,453	40.41	New	1	New
National Alliance for Reconstruction	123	0.59	–37.85	0	–4
Independents	207	0.99	New	0	New
Total	20,920	100.00	–	12	0
Valid votes	20,920	99.56			
Invalid/blank votes	93	0.44			
Total votes	21,013	100.00			
Registered voters/turnout	38,608	54.43			
Source: EBC
