= 2021 Tobago House of Assembly election =

2021 Tobago House of Assembly election may refer to:

- January 2021 Tobago House of Assembly election
- December 2021 Tobago House of Assembly election
