= Arabella Smith =

Turks and Caicos Islands politician

Arabella Smith is a politician from the Turks and Caicos Islands.

== Political career ==
She was the first female minister on the territory, serving as Minister of Natural Resources from 1991 to 1994. She then served as Minister of Health, Youth and Sports.

== See also ==
- List of the first women holders of political offices in North America
