= Vanessa Cutting-Thomas =

Former Tobagonian politician

Presiding Officer of the Tobago House of Assembly
- In office April 2016 – January 2017
- Preceded by: Kelvin Charles
- Succeeded by: Denise Tsoiafatt Angus
- In office December 2019 – September 2020
- Preceded by: Denise Tsoiafatt Angus
- Succeeded by: Oswald Williams

Vanessa Cutting-Thomas is a Tobagonian politician who formerly served as Presiding Officer of the Tobago House of Assembly (THA). She served as a clerk to the Tobago House of Assembly before becoming Presiding Officer from April 2017 to January 2017, and again from December 2019 to September 2020. Cutting-Thomas is a member of the People's National Movement party.

== Political career ==
Before her appointment as the Presiding Officer of the Tobago House of Assembly, Cutting-Thomas served as a clerk to the THA from 2009 to 2013 under the Assembly Legislature Secretariat.

From April 28, 2016 to January 26, 2017, Cutting-Thomas was the Presiding Officer of the Tobago House of Assembly. She replaced previous Presiding Officer Kelvin Charles, who had resigned.

In December 2019, she was re-appointed as presiding officer, succeeding Denise Tsoiafatt Angus, who had held the position for two and a half years. She was nominated for the position by Chief Secretary Kelvin Charles, who she had replaced in her first term in the position. As Presiding Officer, she earned a salary of $20,890.

In May 2020, Cutting-Thomas administered the oath of office to new Chief Secretary Ancil Dennis, a move which faced legal opposition from then-Minority Leader Watson Duke. The position had opened up when Kelvin Charles vacated the role, leaving Cutting-Thomas to call a special sitting and the elected assembly would vote on who would replace him.

In response to the COVID-19 pandemic, Cutting-Thomas swore in Tracy Davidson-Celestine as a councillor in the Tobago House of Assembly and assigned her the portfolio of Secretary in the Division of Health, Wellness, and Family Development.

In October 2020, she was succeeded by Oswald Williams after stepping down from the role the month before.

Cutting-Thomas is a member of the People's National Movement party.
