= Edna Ermyntrude Bourne =

Barbadian politician

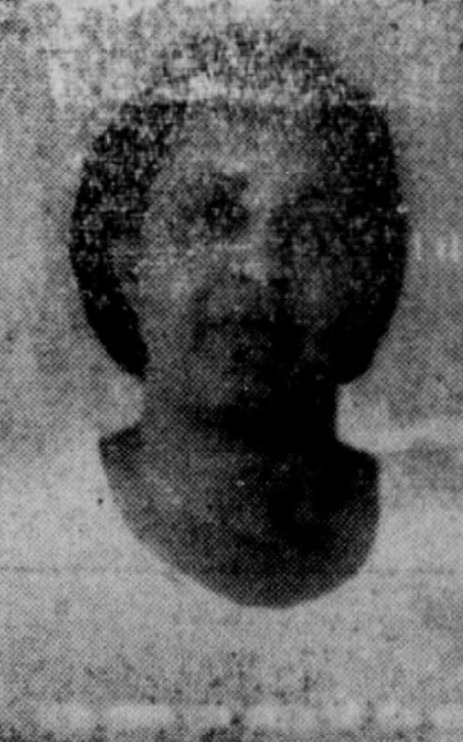
Edna Bourne in 1951.

Edna Ermyntrude "Ermie" Bourne was a politician from Barbados who was the first woman to be elected to the House of Assembly of Barbados. In the 1951 general election, Bourne was elected to represent the parish of St. Andrew and served until 1961. She is buried at the St. Andrew Anglican parish churchyard.

== Legacy ==
The 'Ermy Bourne Highway' was dedicated after the politician. The Committee Room of the East-wing of the Parliament of Barbados was posthumously named the 'Ermyntrude ‘Ermy’ Bourne room' in 2018.

== See also ==
- List of the first women holders of political offices in North America
