= 1992 Tobago House of Assembly election =

- 7 December 1992

All 12 seats in the Tobago House of Assembly 7 seats needed for a majority
- Turnout: 56.69% (▲3.14 pp)
	First party	Second party
	NAR	PNM
Leader	Lennox Denoon	Patrick Manning
Party	NAR	PNM
Leader since		19 December 1986
Leader's seat	Scarborough/Signal Hill	None (Note: Manning represented San Fernando East in the national House of Representatives)
Last election	63.69%, 11 seats	35.88%, 1 seat
Seats won	11 / 12	1 / 12
Seat change	Steady	Steady
Popular vote	10,401	6,562
Percentage	58.70%	37.03%
Swing	▼4.99pp	▲1.15pp
Chairman before election
Jefferson Davidson
NAR
Elected Chairman
Lennox Denoon
NAR

House of Assembly elections were held in Tobago on 7 December 1992 to elect the twelve members of the Tobago House of Assembly. The governing National Alliance for Reconstruction won eleven seats with 58.7% of the vote, while the People's National Movement won one seat with 37.03% of the vote.

== Results ==
Party	Votes	%	+/–	Seats	+/–
National Alliance for Reconstruction	10,401	58.70	–4.99	11	0
People's National Movement	6,562	37.03	+1.15	1	0
Independents	757	4.27	+3.83	0	0
Total	17,720	100.00	–	12	0
Valid votes	17,720	99.22			
Invalid/blank votes	140	0.78			
Total votes	17,860	100.00			
Registered voters/turnout	31,503	56.69			
Source: EBC
