= 2022 People's National Movement leadership election =

Party leadership election in Trinidad and Tobago

- November 26 and 27 and December 4, 2022
- Turnout: 9,111
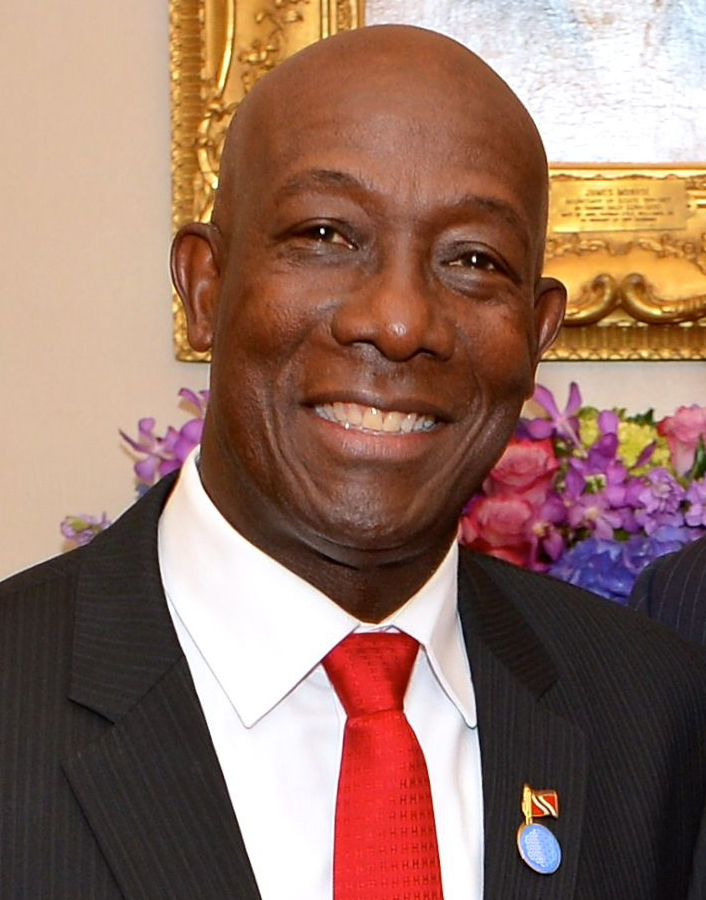
Candidate	Keith Rowley	Karen Nunez-Tesheira	Ronald Boynes
Popular vote	8,424	345	243
Percentage	92.46%	3.79%	2.67%
Candidate	Junior Barrack
Popular vote	99
Percentage	1.09%
Leader of the PNM before election
Keith Rowley
Elected Leader of the PNM
Keith Rowley

The 2022 People's National Movement leadership election, the last one for the PNM before the subsequent general election, took place over three days: November 26 and 27 and December 4, 2022. The current party leader and Prime Minister Keith Rowley had indicated he would most likely not seek to lead the party into the next general election. Rowley made these comments in his victory speech on the night of the 2020 Trinidad and Tobago general election, where the PNM secured a second mandate under his leadership but with the slimmest majority for a government in two decades. However, he announced that he would seek another term as the party's leader in October 2022. In the 2020 general election campaign, he indicated that he would have stood down had the PNM lost. The election followed the 2022 Tobago Council of the People's National Movement leadership election. Keith Rowley won re-election by an overwhelming majority with a low voter turnout with 9,111 out of 105,894 eligible party members voting.

This leadership election followed growing discontent for the PNM government and successive electoral decline in support since 2016, with the party making no inroads since the 2015 Trinidad and Tobago general election, recording net voter and seat share losses and no net gains in the 2016 Trinidadian local elections, 2017 Tobago House of Assembly election, 2019 Trinidadian local elections, 2020 Trinidad and Tobago general election, 2021 and 2022 Trinidadian local government by-elections where the party lost the Arima Central seat for the first time since 2013 and stumbled to third place in the Debe South seat and the party losing votes and seats in Tobago since the 2013 Tobago House of Assembly election, January 2021 Tobago House of Assembly election and December 2021 Tobago House of Assembly election where the party went from controlling all seats in 2009 to one seat in 2021 after two consecutive decades in power.

In addition to Rowley, other candidates for the leadership position were Karen Nunez-Tesheira, Junior Barrack, and Ronald Boynes.

== See also ==
- 2022 Tobago Council of the People's National Movement leadership election
- January 2021 Tobago House of Assembly election
- December 2021 Tobago House of Assembly election
- 2020 United National Congress leadership election
- 2022 United National Congress leadership election
- 2020 Trinidad and Tobago general election
