= 1984 Tobago House of Assembly election =

- 26 November 1984

All 12 seats in the Tobago House of Assembly 7 seats needed for a majority
- Turnout: 70.11% (▲3.87pp)
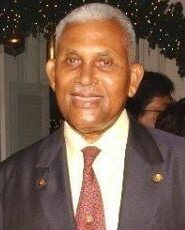

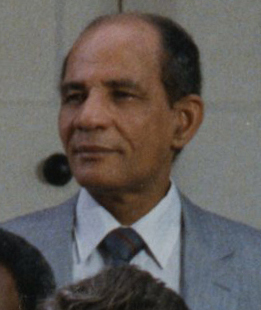
	First party	Second party
Leader	A. N. R. Robinson	George Chambers
Party	DAC	PNM
Leader since	1971	1981
Leader's seat	Roxborough/Delaford	None (Note: Chambers represented Saint Ann's East in the national House of Representatives)
Last election	53.14%, 8 seats	44.65%, 4 seats
Seats won	11 / 12	1 / 12
Seat change	▲3	▼3
Popular vote	11,189	8,200
Percentage	56.90%	41.70%
Swing	▲3.76pp	▼2.95pp
Chairman before election
A. N. R. Robinson
DAC
Elected Chairman
A. N. R. Robinson
DAC

House of Assembly elections were held in Tobago on 26 November 1984 to elect the twelve members of the Tobago House of Assembly. The governing Democratic Action Congress won eleven seats with 56.9% of the votes, while the People's National Movement won one seat with 41.7% of the vote.

== Results ==
Party	Votes	%	+/–	Seats	+/–
Democratic Action Congress	11,189	56.90	+3.76	11	+3
People's National Movement	8,200	41.70	–2.95	1	–3
National Joint Action Committee	274	1.39	New	0	New
Total	19,663	100.00	–	12	0
Valid votes	19,663	99.38			
Invalid/blank votes	123	0.62			
Total votes	19,786	100.00			
Registered voters/turnout	28,220	70.11			
Source: EBC
