= Abby Taylor =

Tobago politician

Abby Tinica Taylor (born 1985) is a Tobagonian politician from the Progressive Democratic Patriots. She was Presiding Officer of the Tobago House of Assembly beginning January 2022, and currently serves as Tobago's Director of Antiquities.

== Early life and education ==
Taylor is a native of Mary's Hill, Tobago, where she attended St Michael’s Anglican Primary School and Scarborough Secondary School. She grew up in a single-parent household with three siblings and a cousin, where her mother "struggled to make ends meet."

In 2012, she graduated from the University of the Southern Caribbean with a Bachelor of Arts in History, where she received 100% tuition coverage through the university's GATE program. She holds a Master's Degree in Carnival Studies from the University of Trinidad and Tobago. As of 2026, Taylor is pursuing a doctorate degree at the University of Trinidad and Tobago, studying the creative and cultural economy.

== Career ==
Taylor is a member of the Progressive Democratic Patriots (PDP) party. In the December 2021 Tobago House of Assembly election, she was the only candidate from her party not to win a seat in the Tobago House of Assembly. The PDP party had reached out to her to ask her to contest the Black Rock/Whim/Spring Garden seat while she was a procurement manager at the Tobago Festivals Commission.

Taylor has been Presiding Officer of the Tobago House of Assembly since January 2022. In the Tobago Assembly Legislature, this position acts as the spokesperson of the Legislature in its relations to other organizations and presides over all sittings of the Assembly. Taylor has advocated for Tobogo legislative history to be added to the national school curriculum. At the time of her selection for the role, at the age of 36, she was the youngest presiding officer in the history of the Tobago House of Assembly.

As Presiding Officer, she introduced the "Primary Plenary" initiative, a program that educates primary school students about legislative government. She also advocated for the digitization of Hansard and historical documents. She represented the Tobago House of Assembly at the 67th Commonwealth Parliamentary Conference in Australia. In 2025, she controversially instructed police officers to escort a former assemblyman out of the House for allegedly disobeying instructions.

In 2026, Taylor became Tobago's Director of Antiquities, the first person to serve in the role. She states in an interview that her priorities in this position will be "proper documentation and digitisation; facilitating better conservation and storage standards; ensuring greater access for schools, communities and the public; and forging stronger partnerships with cultural practitioners and researchers."

== Personal life ==
Taylor is a mother of three children. After giving birth to her youngest child, she suffered from postpartum depression.
