= 1996 Tobago House of Assembly election =

- 9 December 1996

All 12 seats in the Tobago House of Assembly 7 seats needed for a majority
- Turnout: 43.90% (▼12.79pp)
	First party	Second party
	NAR	PNM
Leader	Hochoy Charles	Patrick Manning
Party	NAR	PNM
Leader since		19 December 1986
Leader's seat	Moriah/Parlatuvier	None (Note: Manning represented San Fernando East in the national House of Representatives)
Last election	58.24%, 11 seats	36.74%, 1 seat
Seats won	10 / 12	1 / 12
Seat change	▼1	Steady
Popular vote	8,973	5,023
Percentage	60.10%	33.64%
Swing	▲1.86pp	▼3.10pp
Chairman before election
Lennox Denoon
NAR
Elected Chief Secretary
Hochoy Charles
NAR

House of Assembly elections were held in Tobago on 9 December 1996 to elect the twelve members of the Tobago House of Assembly. The governing National Alliance for Reconstruction won ten seats with 60.1% of the vote, while the People's National Movement won one seat with 33.64% of the vote. Independent candidate (and former NAR member) Deborah Moore-Miggins won a seat in Bethel/Patience Hill.

== Results ==
Party	Votes	%	+/–	Seats	+/–
National Alliance for Reconstruction	8,973	60.10	+1.86	10	–1
People's National Movement	5,023	33.64	–3.10	1	0
Independents	935	6.26	+2.02	1	+1
Total	14,931	100.00	–	12	0
Valid votes	14,931	99.31			
Invalid/blank votes	103	0.69			
Total votes	15,034	100.00			
Registered voters/turnout	34,245	43.90			
Source: EBC
