= Anne Mitchell-Gift =

Tobago politician

Anne Mitchell-Gift is a Tobago politician from the Tobago Council of the People's National Movement who was the first female Presiding Officer of the Tobago House of Assembly, serving from 2001 to 2013.

Mitchell-Gift was the Secretary of Education, Youth Affairs and Sport from 2006 to 2013. The Anne Mitchell-Gift auditorium at the Scarborough library is named after her.
