= 1988 Tobago House of Assembly election =

- 29 November 1988

All 12 seats in the Tobago House of Assembly 7 seats needed for a majority
- Turnout: 53.55% (▼16.56pp)

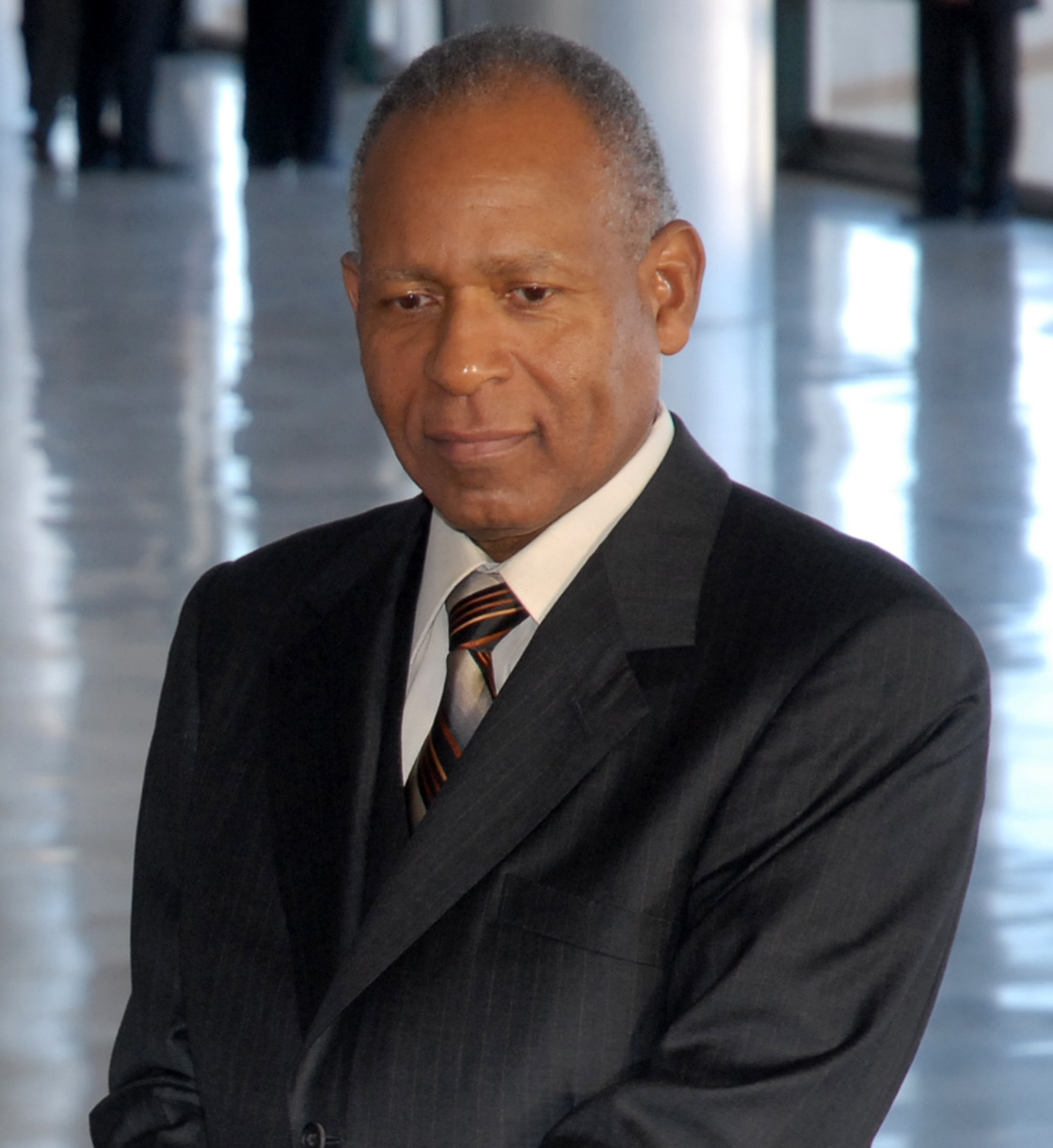
	First party	Second party
Leader	Lennox Denoon	Patrick Manning
Party	NAR	PNM
Leader since		19 December 1986
Leader's seat	Scarborough/Signal Hill	None (Note: Manning represented San Fernando East in the national House of Representatives)
Last election	–	41.70%, 1 seat
Seats won	11 / 12	1 / 12
Seat change	New	1
Popular vote	10,610	5,977
Percentage	63.69%	35.88%
Swing	New	▼5.82pp
Chairman before election
Jefferson Davidson
NAR
Elected Chairman
Lennox Denoon
NAR

House of Assembly elections were held in Tobago on 29 November 1988 to elect the twelve members of the Tobago House of Assembly. The National Alliance for Reconstruction won eleven seats with 63.69% of the vote, while the People's National Movement won one seat with 35.88% of the vote.

== Results ==
Party	Votes	%	+/–	Seats	+/–
National Alliance for Reconstruction	10,610	63.69	New	11	New
People's National Movement	5,977	35.88	–5.82	1	0
Independents	73	0.44	New	0	New
Total	16,660	100.00	–	12	0
Valid votes	16,660	99.64			
Invalid/blank votes	60	0.36			
Total votes	16,720	100.00			
Registered voters/turnout	31,224	53.55			
Source: EBC
