= January 2021 Tobago House of Assembly election =

Deadlocked local government election in Tobago

- 25 January 2021

All 12 seats in the Tobago House of Assembly 7 seats needed for a majority
- Turnout: 51.84% (▲1.64 pp)
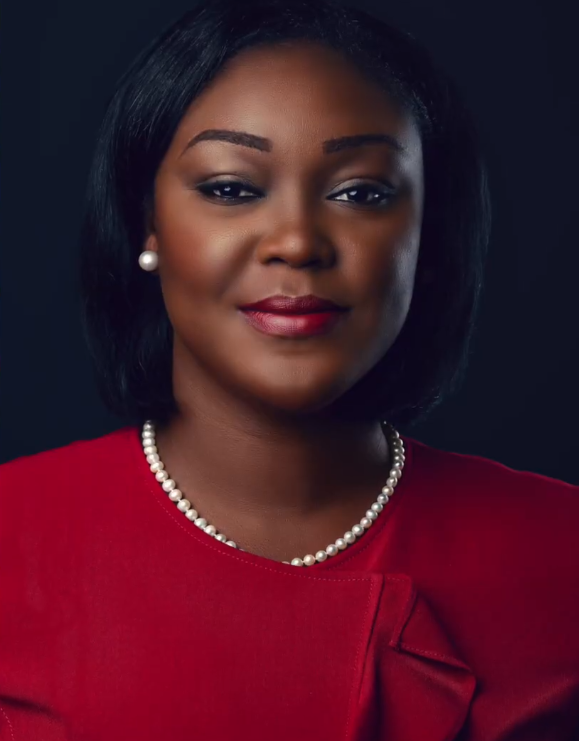

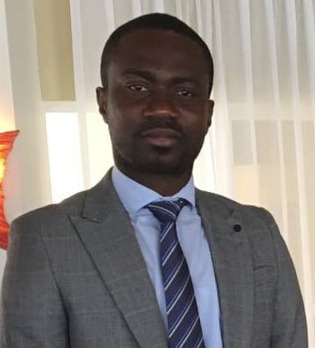
	First party	Second party
Leader	Tracy Davidson-Celestine	Farley Chavez Augustine (Note: Augustine was publicly endorsed as the PDP's Chief Secretary candidate on 24 November 2019, but Watson Duke is party leader.)
Party	PNM	PDP
Leader since	27 January 2020	–
Leader's seat	Lambeau/Signal Hill (Note: Not the incumbent, but stood in this seat and won.)	Parlatuvier/L’Anse Fourmi/Speyside
Last election	10 seats, 54.68%	2 seats, 30.96%
Seats won	6	6
Seat change	▼4	▲4
Popular vote	13,288	12,798
Percentage	50.4%	48.5%
Swing	▼4.32 pp	▲17.5 pp
Chief Secretary before election
Ancil Dennis
PNM
After elections
Ancil Dennis (caretaker government)
PNM

House of Assembly elections were held in Tobago on 25 January 2021 where 12 members were elected in the eleventh election since the Assembly was established in 1980. This election marked the first time in history that both parties elected, the People's National Movement (PNM) and Progressive Democratic Patriots (PDP) won an equal number seats of 6-6, despite the PNM winning the popular vote, resulting in a deadlock and a constitutional crisis with both political parties and Prime Minister Keith Rowley seeking senior counsel advice on the way forward. This election was the first time after 20 years in power that the PNM lost its absolute majority. This election also marked the first time a female political leader was elected to the Assembly and the first time a woman led a major political party or a political party with representation in the Assembly, following the 2020 Tobago Council of the People's National Movement leadership election where Health Secretary, councillor and former Trinidad and Tobago Ambassador to Costa Rica and former Deputy Chief Secretary of Tobago Tracy Davidson-Celestine made history by being elected as the PNM's first female political leader at the regional or national level and one of the first bilingual political leaders in the country's history. If Davidson-Celestine and the PNM were to be elected with a majority to their sixth consecutive term in office, she would have made history, becoming the first female Chief Secretary of Tobago. The election was held alongside local by-elections in Trinidad in which the PNM and UNC retained two districts and the PNM losing one to the UNC.

To break the deadlock and offer a solution to the constitutional crisis, Parliament intervened and passed the THA Amendment Act in March 2021 allowing the Election and Boundaries Commission (EBC) the mandate to increase the electoral boundaries. In September 2021, the EBC report was passed in the Parliament, increasing the electoral boundaries from 12 seats to 15. On 6 October 2021, Chief Secretary Ancil Dennis announced the December 2021 Tobago House of Assembly election to be held on 6 December 2021.

== Background ==
=== 2017 Tobago House of Assembly election ===
The governing Tobago Council of the People's National Movement led by Kelvin Charles were able to retain a strong majority in the Assembly, though not as impressive as their total sweep of all 12 seats in the previous election. Charles became Chief Secretary following the retirement of his predecessor Orville London.

=== Leadership change ===
In 2020 Kelvin Charles lost re-election as Leader of the Tobago Council of the People's National Movement and was replaced by Tracy Davidson-Celestine. Days before a vote of no-confidence in Chief Secretary Kelvin Charles petitioned by eight of the 12 members of the THA to Presiding Officer Vanessa Cutting-Thomas, Charles resigned as Chief Secretary and was replaced by elected assembly member Ancil Dennis with Davidson-Celestine, who is not an elected member of the assembly, being appointed as a councilor in the THA and Health Secretary.

=== 2020 Trinidad and Tobago General Election ===
At the 2020 general election, there was no net change in the number of seats for each party, the PNM decreased their vote share to 61% but was able to retain both seats. The PDP managed 39% of the vote.

=== Lead candidates ===
On 24 November 2019, incumbent Minority Leader in the Tobago House of Assembly and Progressive Democratic Patriots (PDP) political leader and Public Services Association President Watson Duke publicly endorsed incumbent assembly member for Parlatuvier/ L’Anse Fourmi/Speyside and PDP deputy political leader, Farley Chavez Augustine, as the party's lead candidate for the election. Following the 2020 Tobago Council of the People's National Movement leadership election held on January 19, 2020, Tracy Davidson-Celestine was elected as the party's first female political leader and thus the lead candidate for the PNM.

== Electoral system ==
All twelve members are elected via first-past-the-post.

All Tobagonians and Commonwealth citizens aged 18 or over, legally resident in Tobago and who have resided in an electoral district for at least two months prior to the election date are entitled to vote in the elections.

== Parties ==
Political parties registered with the Elections And Boundaries Commission can contest the House of Assembly election as a party. The following registered parties contested the House of Assembly election:

Party	Founded	Ideology	Lead candidate	Lead candidate's seat	Leader(s)	Leader since	Leader's seat	2017 Election Results		Seats at dissolution	Seats contesting	Notes
Party	Founded	Ideology	Lead candidate	Lead candidate's seat	Leader(s)	Leader since	Leader's seat	% party vote	Seats	Seats at dissolution	Seats contesting	Notes
PNM	1955	Centre to centre-left, Liberalism, Social liberalism, Moderate nationalism	Tracy Davidson-Celestine	Ran in Lambeau/Signal Hill (won)	Tracy Davidson-Celestine	January 25, 2020	Ran in Lambeau/Signal Hill (won)	54.68%	10 / 12 (83%)	10 / 12 (83%)	12 seats	
PDP	2016	Tobago regionalism	Farley Chavez Augustine	Parlatuvier/ L’Anse Fourmi/Speyside	Watson Duke	July 2016	Belle Garden East/Roxborough/Delaford	30.96%	2 / 12 (17%)	2 / 12 (17%)	12 seats	
UTP	2020	Tobago regionalism	Nickocy Phillips	Buccoo/Mount Pleasant	Nickocy Phillips	July 2020	Ran in Buccoo/Mount Pleasant (lost)	not founded	—	—	1 seat	
CARM	2010	Tobago regionalism	Ricardo Phillip	Buccoo/Mount Pleasant	Ricardo Phillip	January 2010	Ran in Buccoo/Mount Pleasant (lost)	—	—	—	1 seat	—

== Campaign ==
Both the PNM and PDP announced candidates in all 12 districts. Former Presiding Officer of the Tobago House of Assembly and defeated candidate in the 2020 Tobago Council of the PNM leadership election, Denise Tsoiafatt Angus, who endorsed Davidson Celestine in the second round of the 2020 Tobago Council of the People's National Movement leadership election, filed to run in as an independent candidate in the electoral district of Scarborough/ Calder Hall on January 4, after not being chosen to represent the party for the seat of Scarborough/ Calder Hall, despite being the choice of three out of five PNM party groups. Other candidates include defeated 2020 general election candidates for the constituency of Tobago West, UTP political leader Ricardo Phillip, CARM political leader Nickocy Phillips and journalist Anthony Hector.

Autonomy, corruption, specifically with respect to an incomplete Main Ridge Forest zip line project and the leadership role of controversial PDP political leader and Public Services Association President Watson Duke and his treatment towards women were persistently covered in the media in the lead up to the election. PDP deputy political leader Farley Chavez Augustine said that a 2016 Auditor General management letter on the Main Ridge Forest zipline project revealed that only rope was discovered when the department searched for the $2.5 million material and equipment spent by the Assembly, on the zipline while Davidson Celestine was Tourism and Transport Secretary. The PNM-led Assembly and Prime Minister Rowley has denied any truth to the corruption allegations, stating that although the PNM is not perfect, the party is not corrupt. The PNM has made allegations that the PDP intends to separate Tobago from Trinidad and has been accused of bringing racism into the campaign by alleging that the PDP is a proxy for the United National Congress (UNC), linking both the UNC and PDP to Trumpism and comparing PDP political leader Watson Duke former United States president Donald Trump.

Party	Slogan	Song	Manifesto
PNM	"Building Tobago Together"	Yolanda Job - Building Tobago Together	PNM Tobago Council THA Manifesto 2021-2025
PDP	"Let's Transform Tobago"	WE BLACK and WE PROUD ✊🏿✊🏿✊🏿	

== Marginal seats ==
The following lists identify and rank seats by the margin by which the party's candidate finished behind the winning candidate in the 2017 election.

For information purposes only, seats that have changed hands through subsequent byelections have been noted. Seats whose members have changed party allegiance are ignored.

= appears in two lists

Marginal seats by party (with winning parties and margins from the 2017 Tobago House of Assembly election)
PNM			PDP		
Marginal
1	Parlatuvier/ L’Anse Fourmi/Speyside	7.91%	1	Goodwood/Belle Garden West	0.23%
2	Belle Garden East/Roxborough/Delaford	13.80%	2	Providence/ Mason Hall/Moriah	14.11%
Safe			3	Plymouth/Golden Lane	26.62%
			4	Canaan/Bon Accord	33.09%
			5	Scarborough/ Calder Hall	33.69%
			6	Lambeau/Signal Hill	38.20%
			7	Black Rock/Whim/Spring Garden	38.33%
			8	Bacolet/Mount. St. George	41.01%
			9	Bethel/Mt. Irvine	42.01%
			10	Buccoo/Mount Pleasant	51.57%
Safe
TF
			1	Bethel/Mt. Irvine	23.78%
Safe
Source: Tobago House of Assembly Elections, 2017 – Final Result

== Assembly members not standing for re-election ==
Retiring incumbent		Electoral District	Term in office	Date announced
Jomo Pitt	Tobago Council of the People's National Movement	Lambeau/Signal Hill	2013–2021	26 June 2020

== Candidates by district ==
- Names in **boldface type** represent party leaders.
- † represents that the incumbent did not run again.
- ‡ = Ran for re-election in different district
- § represents that the incumbent was defeated for nomination.
- ₰ represents that the incumbent ran in another district and lost the nomination
- ‡ represents that the incumbent ran in a different district.

Electoral District	Candidates			Incumbent
Electoral District	Tobago Council of the People's National Movement	Progressive Democratic Patriots	Other	Incumbent
Bacolet/Mount. St. George	Joel Jack 1,169	Megan Morrison 780		Joel Jack
Belle Garden East/Roxborough/Delaford	Neil Beckles 1,014	**Watson Duke** 1,417		Watson Duke
Bethel/Mt. Irvine	Shomari Hector 1,028	Terance Baynes 1,045		Shomari Hector
Black Rock/Whim/Spring Garden	Kelvon Morris 1,328	Abby Taylor 820	Anthony Hector (Ind.) 12	† Kelvin Charles
Buccoo/Mount Pleasant	Ancil Dennis 1,209	Jamie Baird 744	**Ricardo Phillip (UTP)** 9 **Nickocy Phillips (CARM)** 9	Ancil Dennis
Canaan/Bon Accord	Clarence Jacob 1,041	Joel Sampson 984		Clarence Jacob
Goodwood/Belle Garden West	Boxil Bailey 1,146	Faith Yisrael 1,405		§ Hayden Spencer
Lambeau/Signal Hill	**Tracy Davidson-Celestine** 1,256	Wayne Clarke 1,040		† Jomo Pitt
Parlatuvier/ L’Anse Fourmi/Speyside	Rory Dillon 1,047	Farley Chavez Augustine 1,367		Farley Chavez Augustine
Plymouth/Golden Lane	Melissa James Guy 1,010	Zorisha Hackett 1,212		§ Marisha Osmond
Providence/ Mason Hall/Moriah	Kwesi Des Vignes 1,101	Ian Pollard 1,185		§ Sheldon Cunningham
Scarborough/ Calder Hall	Marslyn Melville-Jack 939	Trevor James 799	Denise Tsoiafatt Angus (Ind.) 269	Marslyn Melville-Jack

== Opinion polls ==
=== Graphical summary ===
The North American Caribbean Teachers Association (NACTA) commissioned an opinion poll for the election sampling the electorate's opinion.

=== Seat projection ===
Date	Pollster	Sample size	PNM	PDP	Other	Legislative majority
25 January 2021	2021 election	–	6	6		0
23 January 2021	Trinidad and Tobago Guardian/NACTA poll	–	11	1	0	10
8 January 2021	Trinidad and Tobago Guardian/NACTA poll	–	9 (+2)	1 (+2)	0	6 (+4)
23 January 2017	2017 election	–	10	2	0	8

=== Individual poll ===
Date (Note: These are the survey dates of the poll, or if the survey dates are not stated, the date the poll was released.)	Pollster	Sample size	PNM	PDP	Other	Lead
25 January 2021	2021 election	–	50.4	48.5	1.1	1.9
23 January 2021	Trinidad and Tobago Guardian/NACTA poll	–	52	44	–	8
23 January 2017	2017 election	–	54.7	31.0	14.06	23.7

=== Approval ratings ===
The tables below list the public approval ratings of the leaders and leading candidates of the main political parties in Tobago.

==== Tracy Davidson-Celestine ====
Polling firm/Commissioner	Fieldwork date	Sample size	Tracy Davidson-Celestine (PNM)			
Polling firm/Commissioner	Fieldwork date	Sample size	check	X mark	Question	Net
Trinidad and Tobago Guardian/NACTA poll	23 January 2021	–	52	27	21	+25

==== Farley Chavez Augustine ====
Polling firm/Commissioner	Fieldwork date	Sample size	Farley Chavez Augustine (PDP)			
Polling firm/Commissioner	Fieldwork date	Sample size	check	X mark	Question	Net
Trinidad and Tobago Guardian/NACTA poll	23 January 2021	–	43	39	18	+4

==== Watson Duke ====
Polling firm/Commissioner	Fieldwork date	Sample size	Watson Duke (PDP)			
Polling firm/Commissioner	Fieldwork date	Sample size	check	X mark	Question	Net
Trinidad and Tobago Guardian/NACTA poll	23 January 2021	–	?	?	?	+2

== Results ==
Party	Votes	%	Seats	+/–
Tobago Council of the People's National Movement	13,288	50.36	6	–4
Progressive Democratic Patriots	12,798	48.50	6	+4
Unity of the People	9	0.03	0	New
Class Action Reform Movement	9	0.03	0	New
Independents	281	1.06	0	New
Total	26,385	100.00	12	0
Valid votes	26,385	99.68		
Invalid/blank votes	85	0.32		
Total votes	26,470	100.00		
Registered voters/turnout	51,062	51.84		
Source: EBCTT

=== By electoral district ===
Electoral District	Turnout	Previous control	Result
Bacolet/Mount. St. George		PNM	PNM
Belle Garden East/Roxborough/Delaford		PDP	PDP
Bethel/Mt. Irvine		PNM	PDP
Black Rock/Whim/Spring Garden		PNM	PNM
Buccoo/Mount Pleasant		PNM	PNM
Canaan/Bon Accord		PNM	PNM
Goodwood/Belle Garden West		PNM	PDP
Lambeau/Signal Hill		PNM	PNM
Parlatuvier/ L’Anse Fourmi/Speyside		PDP	PDP
Plymouth/Golden Lane		PNM	PDP
Providence/ Mason Hall/Moriah		PNM	PDP
Scarborough/ Calder Hall		PNM	PNM
Source: EBC

== Consequences ==
Trinidad and Tobago's parliament voted on 20 February in favour of a law increasing the number of seats in the Tobago's regional assembly to an uneven 15, which is expected to be followed by early election once new constituencies are drawn, in order to avoid potential seat ties in the future. On September 15, the Trinidad and Tobago House of Representatives passed the EBC (Local Government and Tobago House of Assembly) (Tobago) Order by a margin of 21-18, after which it was passed in the Senate before being signed into law by the President. The bill added three new seats: Lambeau/Lowlands, Darryl Spring/Whim, and Mt St George/Goodwood. All but two of the original districts were also modified slightly under the bill. The December 2021 Tobago House of Assembly election were thus called for 6 December 2021.

== See also ==
- 2020 Tobago Council of the People's National Movement election
- 2020 Trinidad and Tobago general election
- 2019 Trinidadian local elections
