= Ministry of Legal Affairs (Saint Lucia) =

Government ministry of Saint Lucia

The Ministry of Legal Affairs of Saint Lucia aims to optimize the performance of national security institutions by improving human resource capacity and deployment, financial and information management, and utilization. There are past instances in which the Minister of Legal Affairs simultaneously served as the Attorney General.

== List of ministers (Post-1979 upon achieving independence) ==
- Winston Cenac (1979-1980)
- Evans Calderon (1980-1981)
- Kenneth Foster (1981-1982)
- Leonard Riviere (1982-1987)
- Parry Husbands (1987-1992)
- Lorraine Williams (1992-1997) [1st female]
- Velon John (1997-2001)
- Petrus Compton (2001-2004)
- Victor Phillip La Corbiniere (2004-2007)
- Nicholas Frederick (2007-2010)
- Lorenzo Rudolph Francis (2010-2011)
- Victor Phillip La Corbiniere (2012-2016)
- Hermangild Francis (2016–2021)

== See also ==
- Justice ministry
- Politics of Saint Lucia
