= Baptist Union of Trinidad and Tobago =

Baptist Christian denomination in Trinidad and Tobago

- Classification: Evangelical Christianity
- Theology: Baptist
- Associations: Baptist World Alliance
- Headquarters: Princes Town, Trinidad and Tobago
- Origin: 1854
- Congregations: 24
- Members: 3,948

The Baptist Union of Trinidad and Tobago is a Baptist Christian denomination in Trinidad and Tobago. It is affiliated with the Baptist World Alliance. The headquarters are in Princes Town.

== History ==
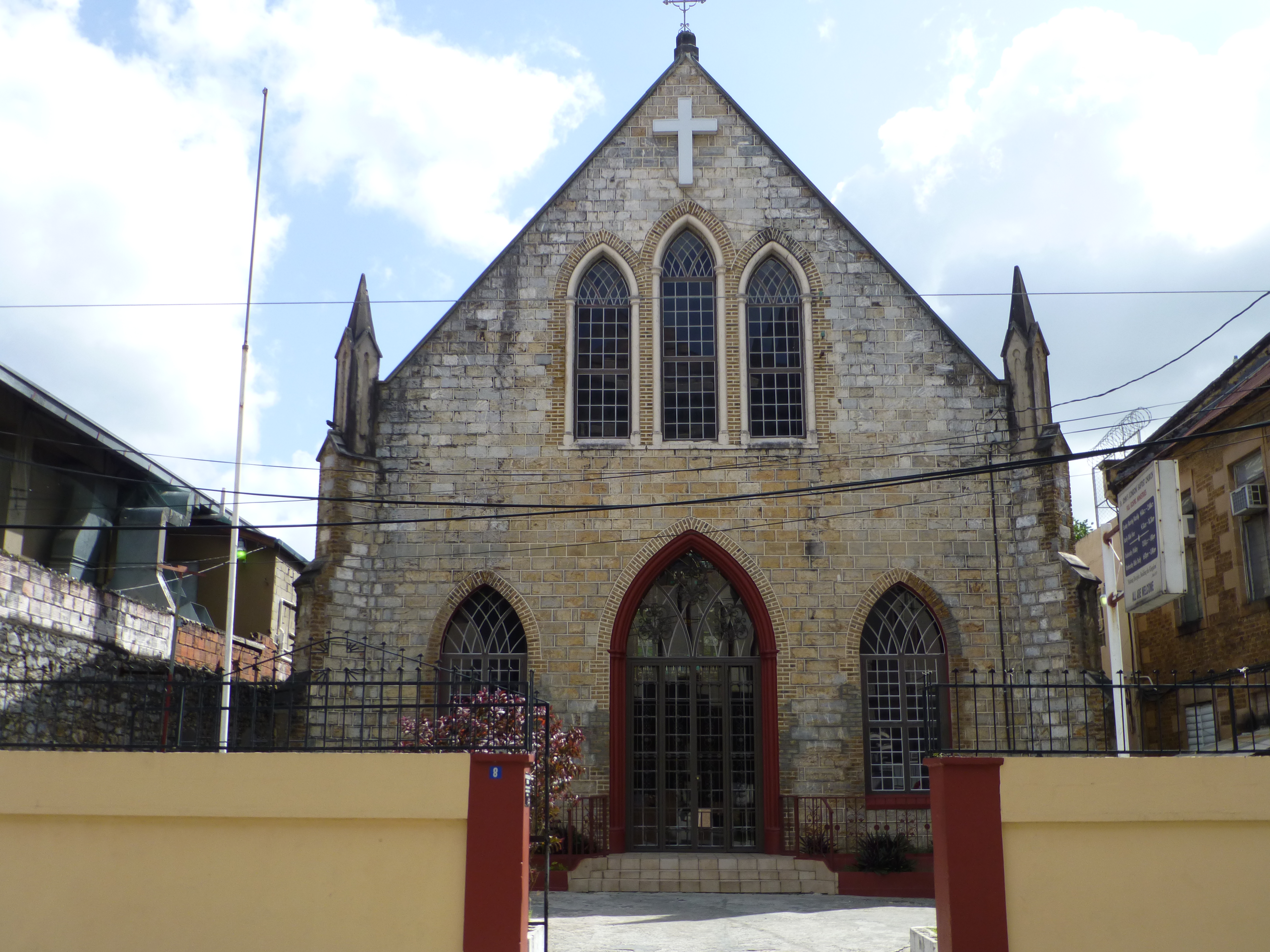
St. John's Baptist Church in Port of Spain.

The Baptist Union of Trinidad and Tobago has its origins in the first Baptist church founded in 1816 by freed slaves from United States. It was officially founded in 1854. According to a census published by the association in 2023, it claimed 24 churches and 3,948 members.
