= 2017 Tobago House of Assembly election =

- 23 January 2017

All 12 seats in the Tobago House of Assembly 7 seats needed for a majority
- Turnout: 50.20% (▼19.88 pp)
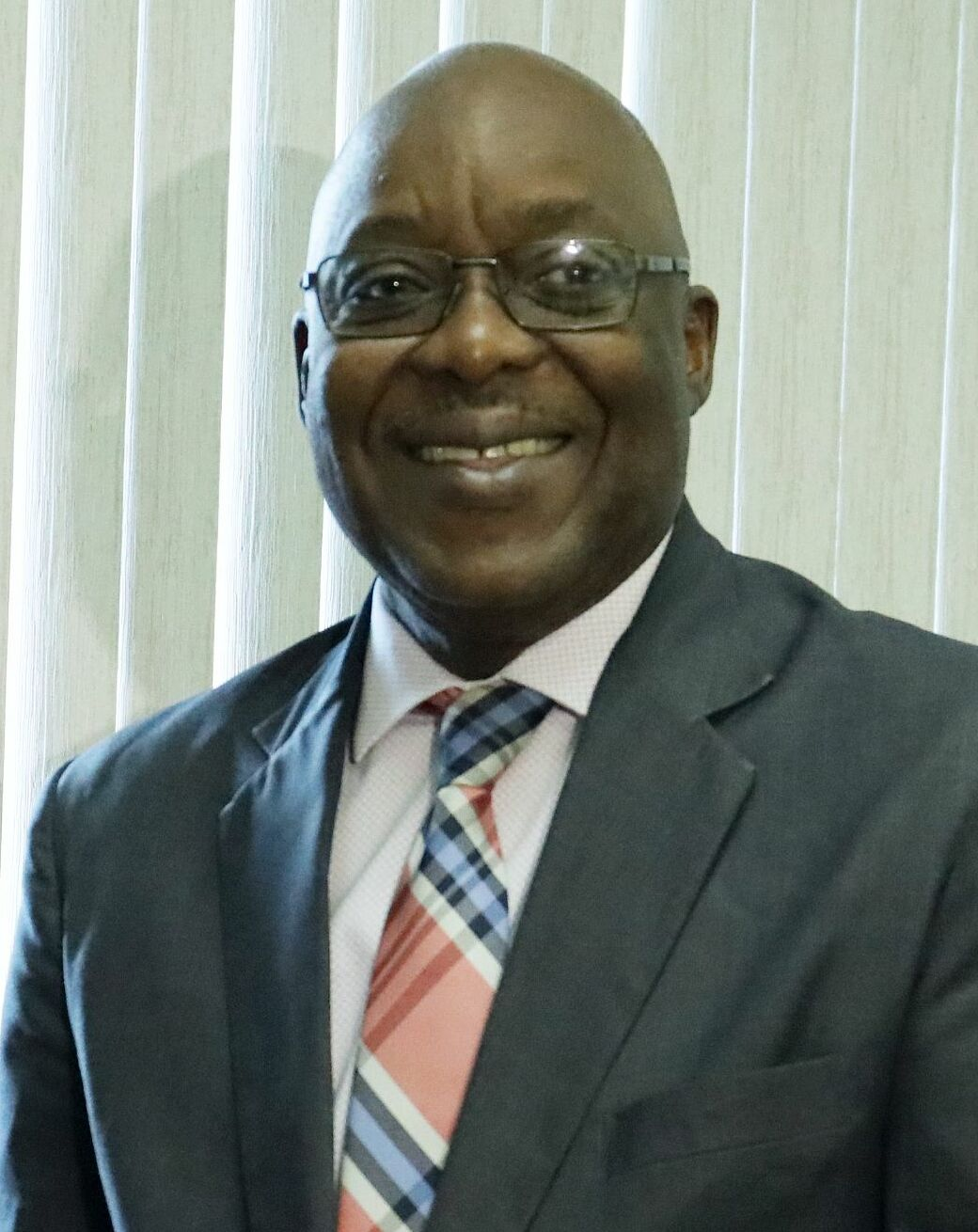

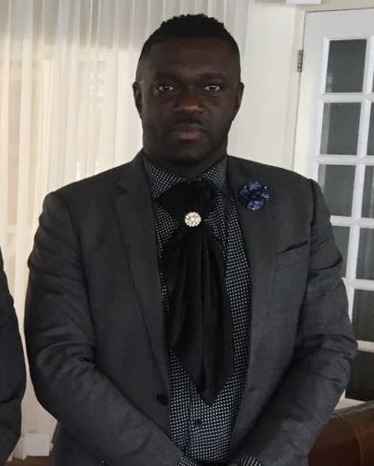
	First party	Second party
Leader	Kelvin Charles	Watson Duke
Party	PNM	PDP
Leader since	3 July 2016	2 July 2016
Leader's seat	Black Rock/Whim/Spring Garden	Belle Garden East/Roxborough/Delaford
Last election	12 seats, 61.42%	New
Seats won	10	2
Seat change	▼2	New
Popular vote	13,310	7,537
Percentage	54.68%	30.96%
Swing	▼6 pp	New
- Tobago Council of the People's National Movement Progressive Democratic Patriots
Chief Secretary before election
Orville London
PNM
Elected Chief Secretary
Kelvin Charles
PNM

House of Assembly elections were held in Tobago on 23 January 2017. The result was a victory for the People's National Movement, which won ten of the twelve seats in the Tobago House of Assembly.

== Results ==
Constituency	Movement for Transformation	People's National Movement	Progressive Democratic Patriots	Tobago Forwards	Invalid ballots	Total	Electorate	Turnout
Parlatuvier/L' Anse Fourmi/Speyside	0	926	1,095	111	4	2,136	3,650	58.52%
Goodwood/Belle Garden West	0	953	948	332	8	2,241	4,142	54.10%
Belle Garden East/Roxborough/Delaford	14	949	1,261	34	3	2,261	3,741	60.44%
Scarborough/Calder Hall	0	1,130	512	184	8	1,834	4,076	45.00%
Lambeau/Signal Hill	0	1,185	424	372	11	1,992	4,343	45.87%
Bacolet/Mt. St. George	0	1,157	425	191	12	1,785	3,683	48.47%
Canaan/Bon Accord	0	1,188	547	197	5	1,937	4,000	48.43%
Buccoo/Mt. Pleasant	0	1,291	319	266	9	1,885	4,363	43.20%
Bethel/Mt Irvine	0	1,184	283	674	4	2,145	4,370	49.08%
Providence/Mason Hall/Moriah	28	1,089	800	129	3	2,049	4,265	48.04%
Plymouth/Golden Lane	0	1,012	493	434	10	1,949	3,857	50.53%
Black Rock/Whim/Spring Garden	17	1,246	430	428	8	2,129	4,490	47.42%
Total	59	13,310	7,537	3,352	85	24,343	48,490	50.20%
Total	0.24%	54.87%	31.07%	13.82%	–			
Swing	New	▼6.55%	New	New	–			

=== Control ===
Electoral District	Previous control	Subsequent control
Bacolet/Mt. St. George	PNM	PNM
Belle Garden East/Roxborough/Delafor	PNM	PDP
Bethel/Mt Irvine	PNM	PNM
Black Rock/Whim /SpringTobago Council of the Garden	PNM	PNM
Buccoo/Mt. Pleasant	PNM	PNM
Canaan/Bon Accord	PNM	PNM
Goodwood/Belle Garden West	PNM	PNM
Lambeau/Signal Hill	PNM	PNM
Parlatuvier/L'Anse Fourmi/Speyside	PNM	PDP
Plymouth/Golden Lane	PNM	PNM
Providence/Mason Hall/Moriah	PNM	PNM
Scarborough/Calder Hall	PNM	PNM
Source: EBC

=== Voting-seating comparison ===
Popular vote
PNM	54.87%
PDP	31.07%
TF	13.82%
MfT	0.24%

Seating percentage
PNM	83.33%
PDP	16.67%
TF	0%
MfT	0%
