= Tracy Davidson-Celestine =

Trinidadian and Tobagonian politician

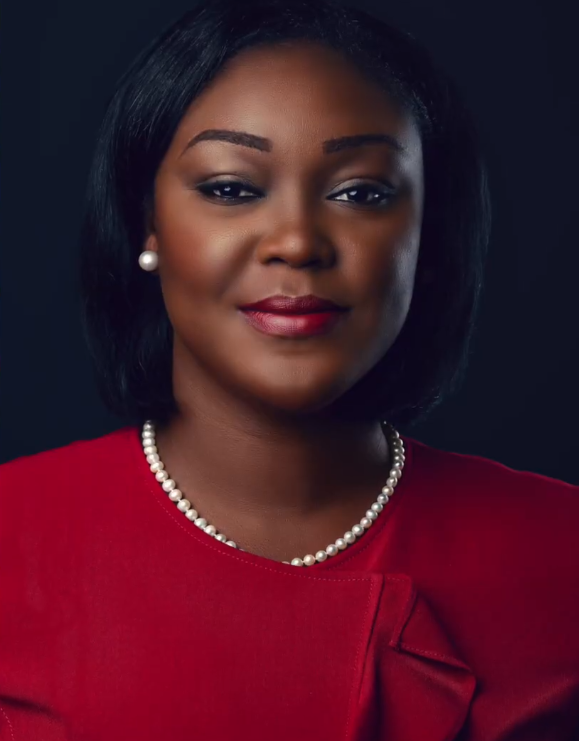

Political Leader of the Tobago Council of the People's National Movement and Deputy leader of the People's National Movement
- In office 26 January 2020 – 1 May 2022
- Preceded by: Kelvin Charles

Trinidad and Tobago Ambassador to Costa Rica
- In office 26 April 2017 – 29 February 2020
- Preceded by: Sandra Honore

Personal details
- Born: Tracy Petulia Davidson; 20 September 1978 (age 47) Roxborough, Tobago, Trinidad and Tobago
- Party: Tobago Council of the People's National Movement
- Other political affiliations: People's National Movement
- Education: University of the West Indies; Australian Institute of Business
- Occupation: Ambassador politician

Tracy Petulia Davidson-Celestine (born 20 September 1978) is a Tobagonian politician who is the former Secretary of Health, Wellness and Family Development, as well as a former Councillor in the Tobago House of Assembly (THA) becoming one of the leading members addressing the COVID-19 pandemic in Tobago. She is the first female political leader in the THA, a defeated Chief Secretary candidate, the first woman to lead a Tobagonian party with representation in the House of Representatives and Tobago House of Assembly and one of the first bilingual political leaders in Trinidad and Tobago, as a result she has been popularly referred to by the nickname Boss Lady.

She previously served as Trinidad and Tobago's Ambassador to Costa Rica 2017 to 2020 before being elected as political leader of the Tobago Council of the People's National Movement since the 2020 leadership election, where she became the first female political leader of the People's National Movement in a regional or national capacity.

She previously served as Deputy Chief Secretary, tourism secretary and councillor in the Tobago House of Assembly.

== Early life and education ==
Davidson-Celestine was born in the north eastern village of King's Bay, Delaford, Tobago and is the third of four children. She was educated at Signal Hill Secondary School before going on to study Leadership and Management at the Australian Institute of Business and UWI Cave Hill.

== Political career ==
=== Leader of the PNM Tobago Council, 2020–2022 ===
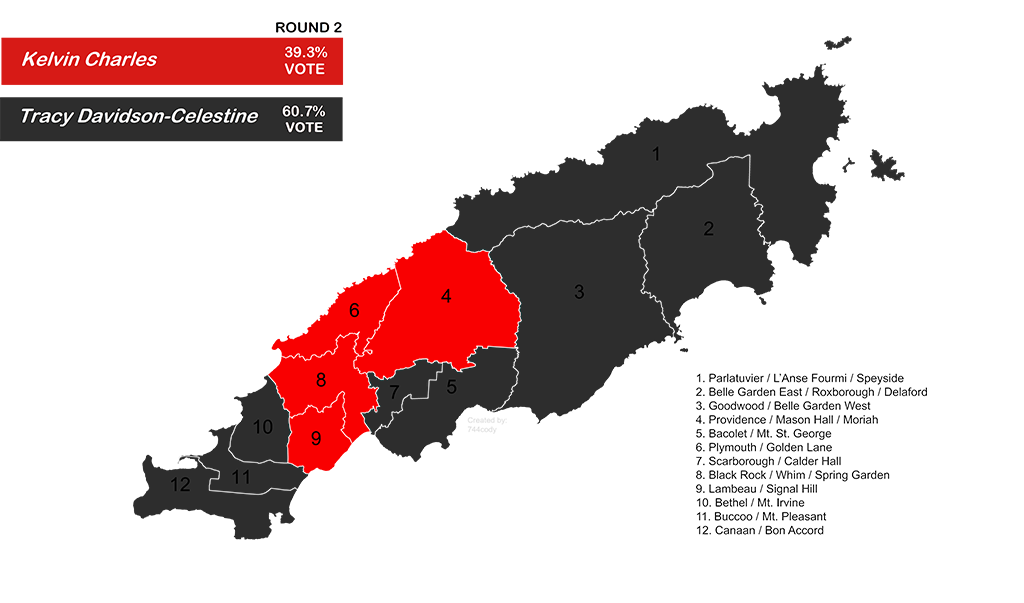
Results of the second round by plurality of points, where the following colours denote each respective leadership candidate: Tracy Davidson-Celestine Kelvin Charles

Team Tracy
- Candidate: Tracy Davidson-Celestine
- Affiliation: Tobago Council of the People's National Movement
- Status: Won
- Headquarters: Tobago
- Slogan: Let's Get it Right This Time!

On 26 January 2020, Davidson-Celestine was elected political leader of the PNM Tobago Council, beating incumbent political leader and chief secretary, Kelvin Charles.

Party political offices
Preceded by Kelvin Charles	Leader of the Tobago Council of the People's National Movement; 2020–2022	Succeeded by Ancil Dennis
Diplomatic posts
Preceded by Sandra Honore	Trinidad and Tobago Ambassador to Costa Rica; 2017–2020	Incumbent
