= Presiding Officer of the Tobago House of Assembly =

- Incumbent; Abby Taylor since 9 December 2021
- Style: Presiding Officer (Within Parliament); The Honourable (Formal)
- Term length: Elected by the Tobago House of Assembly at the start of each session, and upon a vacancy, no limits imposed
- Inaugural holder: Jefferson G. Davidson; Christo Gift (Deputy Presiding Officer)
- Formation: 1996
- Deputy: Joel Sampson
- Salary: TT$20,890 (per month) (Presiding Officer); TT$13,930 (per month) (Deputy Presiding Officer)

The Presiding Officer of the Tobago House of Assembly is elected by the assembly members and presides over all Sittings of the assembly.

The current Presiding Officer of the Tobago House of Assembly is Abby Taylor of the Progressive Democratic Patriots.

== List of Presiding Officers ==
Name		Term of office		Political Party	Notes
1	Jefferson Davidson	16 December 1986	2000	NAR	
2	Anne Mitchell-Gift	2001	24 January 2013	PNM	
3	Kelvin Charles	25 January 2013	23 March 2016	PNM	
4	Vanessa Cutting-Thomas	28 April 2016	26 January 2017	PNM	
5	Denise Tsoiafatt Angus	26 January 2017	21 November 2019	PNM	
(4)	Vanessa Cutting-Thomas	19 December 2019	25 September 2020	PNM	
6	Oswald Williams	22 October 2020	28 January 2021	PNM	
7	Abby Taylor	9 December 2021	Incumbent	PDP	

== List of Deputy Presiding Officers ==
Name	Term of office		Political Party	Electoral District	Notes	Name	Entered office	Left office	Political Party	Electoral District	Notes
Christo Gift	1996	2000	NAR								
Anthony Arnold	2001	2005	PNM								
Albert Pilgrim	2005	24 January 2013	PNM	Black Rock/Whim/Spring Garden							
Ancil Dennis	25 January 2013	5 May 2020	PNM	Buccoo/Mount Pleasant		Dion Isaac	25 January 2013	26 January 2017	PNM		
Shomari Hector	29 May 2020	28 January 2021	PNM	Bethel/Mt. Irvine							
Joel Sampson	9 December 2021	Incumbent	PDP	Bon Accord/Crown Point							

== See also ==
- Chief Secretary of Tobago
- List of Presiding Officers of the Tobago House of Assembly
- Local government in Trinidad and Tobago
- Politics of Trinidad and Tobago
- Presiding Officer (disambiguation page)
- Tobago House of Assembly
