= Chief Secretary of Tobago =

Leader of the Tobagonian government

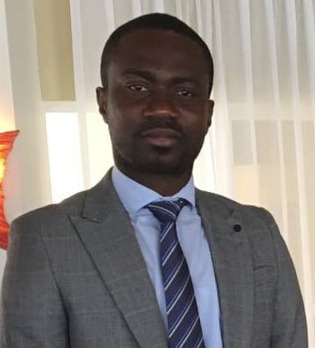
- Incumbent; Farley Chavez Augustine since 9 December 2021; 4 years ago
- Tobagonian Government; Tobago House of Assembly
- Style: Chief Secretary (informal); The Honourable (formal)
- Status: Head of Government
- Abbreviation: CS
- Member of: Tobago House of Assembly; Cabinet
- Reports to: Tobago House of Assembly
- Residence: Office of the Chief Secretary
- Seat: Scarborough, Tobago
- Nominator: Tobago House of Assembly
- Appointer: President of Trinidad and Tobago
- Term length: The Chief Secretary is nominated among the Assembly following quadrennial elections to the Assembly or resignation of the previous Chief Secretary
- Formation: 4 December 1980; 45 years ago
- First holder: ANR Robinson AM
- Succession: 7th in order of precedence
- Deputy: Faith B. Yisrael
- Salary: TT$492,360 per annum
- Website: www.tha.gov.tt/divisions/office-of-the-chief-secretary/

The Chief Secretary of Tobago is the leader of the Tobagonian Government. The Chief Secretary chairs the Tobagonian Cabinet and is primarily responsible for the formulation, development and presentation of Tobagonian Government policy. Additional functions of the Chief Secretary include promoting and representing Tobago in an official capacity, at home and abroad, and responsibility for constitutional affairs, as they relate to devolution and the Tobagonian Government.

The Chief Secretary is a Member of the Assembly, and is nominated by the Tobago House of Assembly before bring officially appointed by the president. Members of the Tobagonian Cabinet as well as councilors of the Tobagonian Government are appointed by the Chief Secretary. As head of the Tobagonian Government, the Chief Secretary is directly accountable to the Tobago House of Assembly for their actions and the actions of the Tobagonian Government.

The official office of the Chief Secretary is in Calder Hall Road, Scarborough, Tobago as well as the Tobago House of Assembly on Jermingham Street.

The current Chief Secretary of the Tobago House of Assembly is Mr. Farley Chavez Augustine of the Tobago People’s Party. He assumed office on December 9, 2021.

== Election and term ==
The Chief Secretary is almost always the leader of the largest party, or the leader of the senior partner in any majority coalition. There is no term of office for a Chief Secretary. In practice, they hold office as long as they retain the confidence of the chamber; indeed, they are required to either resign or seek a parliamentary dissolution (and with it, new elections) if their government "no longer enjoys the confidence of the Parliament." Whenever the office of Chief Secretary falls vacant, the President is responsible for appointing the new incumbent; the appointment is formalised at a meeting between the President and the Chief Secretary designate.

If an incumbent Chief Secretary is defeated in a general election, they do not immediately vacate office. The Chief Secretary only leaves office when the Tobago House of Assembly nominates a successor individual.

The period in office of a Chief Secretary is not linked to the term of members of the Tobago House of Assembly. A maximum four-year term is set for each session of Parliament.

Parliament can be dissolved and an extraordinary general election held, before the expiration of the four-year term.

The Chief Secretary, once appointed continues in office as the head of the devolved Tobago House of Assembly until either resignation, dismissal, or death. Resignation can be triggered off by the passage of a Motion of No Confidence in the Chief Secretary or the Tobagonian Government or by rejecting a Motion of Confidence in the Tobago House of Assembly. In those situations, the Chief Secretary must tender their resignation and the resignation of their government to the president. In such circumstances, the Presiding Officer appoints an interim Chief Secretary, until the Tobago House of Assembly determines on a new nominee to be presented to the President for formal appointment.

== Nomination and appointment ==
Candidates for the position of Chief Secretary are nominated by the members of the Tobago House of Assembly from among its assembly members at the beginning of each term. The members elect the nominee for the Chief Secretary by majority vote. If no one is elected by a majority of votes cast with the first set of nominations, the process continues until a majority decide to cast their vote for one candidate. This process does not require an absolute majority of the Assembly (currently 8 out of 15 members).

Once this process has occurred the Presiding Officer shall formally send a letter to the incumbent President who must then appoint that nominee to the position of Chief Secretary.

== List of chairmen and chief secretaries ==
Below is a list of office-holders:

NAR (3) PNM (3) PDP (1) DAC (1)
No.	Portrait	Officeholder (birth–death) Office	Term of office and mandate Duration in years and days			Party	Government	Deputy	
Chairman of the Tobago House of Assembly
1		A. N. R. Robinson (1926–2014) AM for Roxborough/Delaford	4 December 1980	16 December 1986	1980	Democratic Action Congress	Robinson I	1	Jefferson Davidson (DAC) 1980-1986 (NAR) 1986
1		A. N. R. Robinson (1926–2014) AM for Roxborough/Delaford	4 December 1980	16 December 1986	1984	Democratic Action Congress	Robinson II	1	Jefferson Davidson (DAC) 1980-1986 (NAR) 1986
1		A. N. R. Robinson (1926–2014) AM for Roxborough/Delaford	6 years, 12 days			Democratic Action Congress	Robinson II	1	Jefferson Davidson (DAC) 1980-1986 (NAR) 1986
2		Jefferson Davidson (c.1938–2023) AM for Belle Garden/Goodwood	16 December 1986	31 October 1989	—	National Alliance for Reconstruction	Davidson I	2	Hochoy Charles (NAR)
2		Jefferson Davidson (c.1938–2023) AM for Belle Garden/Goodwood	16 December 1986	31 October 1989	1988	National Alliance for Reconstruction	Davidson II	3	Benedict Armstrong (NAR)
2		Jefferson Davidson (c.1938–2023) AM for Belle Garden/Goodwood	3 years, 15 days			National Alliance for Reconstruction	Davidson II	3	Benedict Armstrong (NAR)
3		Lennox Denoon (1930–2007) AM for Scarborough/Signal Hill	1 November 1989	December 1996	1992	National Alliance for Reconstruction	Denoon	3	Benedict Armstrong (NAR)
Chief Secretary of the Tobago House of Assembly
4		Hochoy Charles (1946–2023) AM for Moriah/Parlatuvier	December 1996	31 January 2001	1996	National Alliance for Reconstruction	Charles	4	Cecil Caruth (NAR)
5		Orville London (1945–) AM for Scarborough/Calder Hall	1 February 2001	26 January 2017	2001	People's National Movement	London I	5	Cynthia Alfred (PNM)
5		Orville London (1945–) AM for Scarborough/Calder Hall	1 February 2001	26 January 2017	2005	People's National Movement	London II	5	Cynthia Alfred (PNM)
5		Orville London (1945–) AM for Scarborough/Calder Hall	1 February 2001	26 January 2017	2009	People's National Movement	London III	6	Hilton Sandy (PNM)
5		Orville London (1945–) AM for Scarborough/Calder Hall	1 February 2001	26 January 2017	2013	People's National Movement	London IV	7	Tracy Davidson-Celestine (PNM)
5		Orville London (1945–) AM for Scarborough/Calder Hall	15 years, 360 days			People's National Movement	London IV	7	Tracy Davidson-Celestine (PNM)
6		Kelvin Charles (1957–) AM for Black Rock/Whim/Spring Garden	26 January 2017	30 April 2020	2017	People's National Movement	Charles	8	Joel Jack (PNM)
6		Kelvin Charles (1957–) AM for Black Rock/Whim/Spring Garden	3 years, 95 days			People's National Movement	Charles	8	Joel Jack (PNM)
—		Joel Jack (acting)	30 April 2020	6 May 2020	—	People's National Movement	Charles	8	Joel Jack (PNM)
—		Joel Jack (acting)	6 days			People's National Movement	Charles	8	Joel Jack (PNM)
7		Ancil Dennis (1987–) AM for Buccoo/Mount Pleasant	6 May 2020	8 December 2021	—	People's National Movement	Dennis	8	Joel Jack (PNM)
7		Ancil Dennis (1987–) AM for Buccoo/Mount Pleasant	1 year, 216 days			People's National Movement	Dennis	8	Joel Jack (PNM)
8		Farley Chavez Augustine (1985–) AM for Parlatuvier/L’anse Fourmi/Speyside	8 December 2021	Incumbent	2021 (December)	Progressive Democratic Patriots	Augustine	9	Watson Solomon Duke (PDP) (2021-2022) Faith B. Yisrael (Independent) (2022-)
8		Farley Chavez Augustine (1985–) AM for Parlatuvier/L’anse Fourmi/Speyside	4 years, 273 days			Progressive Democratic Patriots	Augustine	9	Watson Solomon Duke (PDP) (2021-2022) Faith B. Yisrael (Independent) (2022-)

== Previous nominating elections ==
Party key	PNM
Party key	PDP

Chief Secretary nominative elections
Parliamentary term	Date	Candidates	Votes received	
Twelfth Assembly	9 December 2021	Farley Chavez Augustine	Nominated by	Watson Solomon Duke
Twelfth Assembly	9 December 2021	Farley Chavez Augustine	Seconded by	Zorisha Hackett
Eleventh Assembly	4 February 2021	No Chief Secretary nominative election was subsequently held due to preceding deadlocked Presiding Officer nominative elections;Ancil Dennis remains as Caretaker Chief Secretary		
Eleventh Assembly	1 February 2021	No Chief Secretary nominative election was subsequently held due to preceding deadlocked Presiding Officer nominative elections;Ancil Dennis remains as Caretaker Chief Secretary		
Eleventh Assembly	28 January 2021	No Chief Secretary nominative election was subsequently held due to preceding deadlocked Presiding Officer nominative elections;Ancil Dennis remains as Caretaker Chief Secretary		
Tenth Assembly	6 May 2020	Ancil Dennis	Nominated by	Sheldon Cunningham
Tenth Assembly	6 May 2020	Ancil Dennis	Seconded by	Hayden Spencer

== See also ==
- Tobago House of Assembly
- List of Presiding Officers of the Tobago House of Assembly
