= List of Trinidad and Tobago Members of Parliament =

Past and present Members of Parliament in Trinidad and Tobago

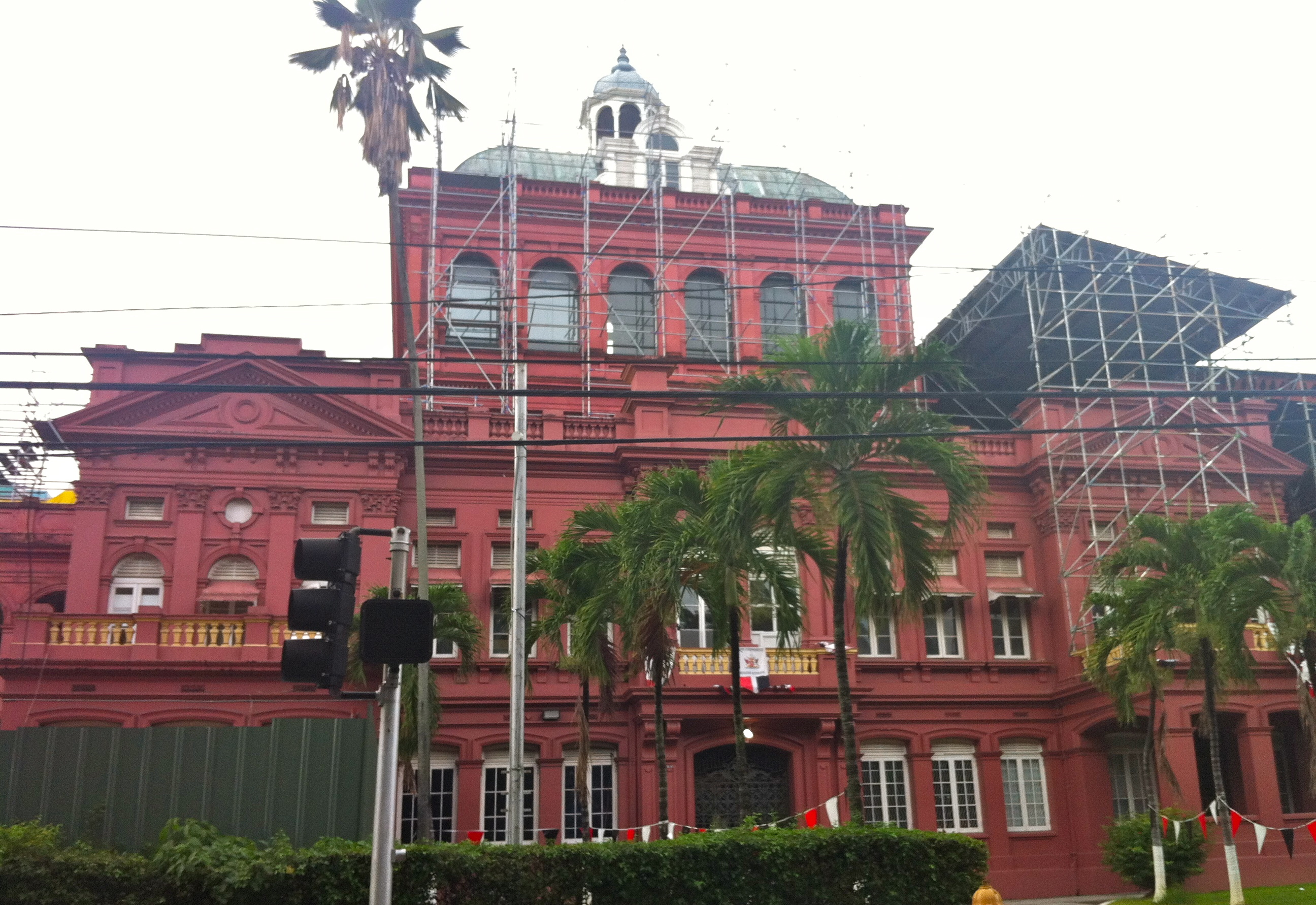
The Red House in Port of Spain is the base of the Parliament.

The following is a list of past and present Members of Parliament (MPs) of the House of Representatives, the lower house of the Parliament of Trinidad and Tobago. Today there are 41 MPs and each of them represent single member constituencies across the country under the first-past-the-post. 96% of the population live on the island of Trinidad, and they have 39 MPs while Tobago has 2.

Trinidad and Tobago is a unitary parliamentary republic which gained independence on 31 August 1962 after over 160 years under British rule. Due to the influence of the British Empire, the parliament is based on the Westminster system. The two largest parties historically have been the dominant People's National Movement (PNM) and the United National Congress (UNC) which has mainly formed the opposition.

The diversity of the country has been a factor in Parliament over time with Afro–Trinidadians and Tobagonians, Indo–Trinidadians and Tobagonians and European-Trinidadians and Tobagonians. In terms of religious diversity, the country's different faiths have also been represented in Parliament. In terms of gender, female representation has been an issue. In the 2020-2025 session, women in the Parliament accounted for 31% of members.

The most recent election was held on 28 April 2025.

== Colour key ==
People's National Movement
United National Congress
Democratic Action Congress
Tobago Organisation of the People
National Alliance for Reconstruction
Congress of the People
People's Democratic Party
Democratic Labour Party
United Labour Front
Trades Union Congress and Socialist Party
Tobago People's Party

== List ==
| Name | Party | Term start | Term end | Constituency | Other positions | Ref. |
|---|---|---|---|---|---|---|
| Clarence Carmichael Abidh | TUCSP | 1946 | 1950 | Caroni | | |
| Mustapha Abdul-Hamid | PNM | 2007 | 2010 | Chaguanas East | | |
| Lawrence Achong | PNM | 2000 | 2007 | Point Fortin | | |
| Faris Al-Rawi | PNM | 2015 | 2025 | San Fernando West | | |
| Roger Alexander | UNC | 2025 | Present | Tunapuna | | |
| Alexander Chamberlain Alexis | PNM | 1961 | 1976 | La Brea | | |
| Aiyna Ali | UNC | 2025 | Present | Princes Town | | |
| Ashraf Ali | PNM | 1971 | 1976 | St. Augustine | | |
| Razack Ali | UNC | 1995 | 2000 | Ortoire/Mayaro | | |
| Yahir Kassim Ali | PNM | 1971 | 1976 | Couva | | |
| Desmond Allum | PNM | 1991 | 1995 | Port of Spain North/Saint Ann's West | | |
| Khadijah Ameen | UNC | 2020 | Present | St. Augustine | | |
| Ian Anthony | PNM | 1976 | 1986 | La Brea | | |
| Ancil Antoine | PNM | 2015 | 2020 | D'Abadie/O'Meara | | |
| Vernella Alleyne-Toppin | TOP | 2010 | 2015 | Tobago East | | |
| Mervyn Assam | UNC | 1995 | 2000 | St. Joseph | | |
| Mervyn Assam | UNC | 2000 | 2001 | Tunapuna | | |
| Maxwell Awon | PNM | 1966 | 1976 | Arima | | |
| Linda Baboolal | PNM | 1991 | 1995 | Barataria/San Juan | | |
| Delmon Baker | TOP | 2010 | 2015 | Tobago West | | |
| Afraz Mohammed Baksh | DLP | 1966 | 1971 | Princes Town | | |
| Nizam Baksh | UNC | 2001 | 2015 | Naparima | | |
| Sadiq Baksh | UNC | 2000 | 2002 | San Fernando West | | |
| Brensley Barrow | PNM | 1971 | 1981 | Port of Spain Central | | |
| Pennelope Beckles | PNM | 2020 | Present | Arima | | |
| Felix Bellamy | PNM | 1976 | 1981 | Arima | | |
| Michelle Benjamin | UNC | 2020 | Present | Moruga/Tableland | | |
| Hedwige Bereaux | PNM | 1991 | 2007 | La Brea | | |
| Alfredo Bermudez | PNM | 1961 | 1966 | Port of Spain North | | |
| Alfredo Bermudez | PNM | 1966 | 1971 | Port of Spain Central | | |
| Hulsie Bhaggan | UNC | 1991 | 1995 | Chaguanas | | |
| Vasant Bharath | UNC | 2007 | 2010 | St. Augustine | | |
| John Bharath | DLP | 1966 | 1971 | St. Augustine | | |
| Ramprasad Bhoolai | DLP | 1966 | 1971 | Nariva | | |
| Christian Birchwood | PNM | 2025 | Present | Laventille East/Morvant | | |
| Fitzgerald Blackman | PNM | 1966 | 1971 | Port of Spain West | | |
| Lackram Bodoe | UNC | 2015 | 2025 | Fyzabad | | |
| Lackram Bodoe | UNC | 2025 | Present | Oropouche West | | |
| Roger Boynes | PNM | 1995 | 2007 | Toco/Manzanilla | | |
| Cyril Brown | PNM | 1971 | 1976 | Diego Martin West | | |
| Amery Browne | PNM | 2007 | 2015 | Diego Martin Central | | |
| Victor Bryan | TUCSP | 1946 | 1950 | Eastern Counties | | |
| Victor Bryan | TUCSP | 1956 | 1961 | St. Andrew/St. David | | |
| Kenneth Butcher | PNM | 1986 | 1991 | Barataria/San Juan | | |
| Stephen Cadiz | UNC | 2010 | 2015 | Chaguanas East | | |
| Stanford Callender | PNM | 2000 | 2010 | Tobago West | | |
| Victor Campbell | PNM | 1956 | 1961 | Nariva-Mayaro | | |
| Victor Campbell | PNM | 1961 | 1981 | Ortoire/Mayaro | | |
| Rudranath Capildeo | DLP | 1961 | 1966 | St. Augustine | Leader of the Opposition (1961–1967) | |
| Rudranath Capildeo | DLP | 1966 | 1971 | Chaguanas | Leader of the Opposition (1961–1967) | |
| Simbhoonath Capildeo | DLP | 1961 | 1966 | Couva | | |
| Desmond Cartey | PNM | 1981 | 1986 | Laventille | | |
| Andrew Casimire | PNM | 1991 | 1995 | Toco/Manzanilla | | |
| William Chaitan | UNC | 2000 | 2001 | Pointe-à-Pierre | | |
| George Chambers | PNM | 1966 | 1981 | Saint Ann's | | |
| George Chambers | PNM | 1981 | 1986 | Saint Ann's East | | |
| Carson Charles | NAR | 1986 | 1991 | St. Joseph | | |
| Horace Charles | PNM | 1971 | 1976 | Siparia | | |
| Rodney Charles | UNC | 2015 | 2025 | Naparima | | |
| Selwyn Charles | PNM | 1971 | 1976 | Caroni East | | |
| Elmina Clarke-Allen | PNM | 1981 | 1986 | Toco/Manzanilla | | |
| Kenneth Collis | PNM | 1991 | 1995 | Laventille East/Morvant | | |
| Learie Constantine | PNM | 1956 | 1961 | Tunapuna | Trinidad and Tobago's High Commissioner to the United Kingdom | |
| Donna Cox | PNM | 2007 | 2015 | Laventille East/Morvant | | |
| Cherrie Ann Crichlow-Cockburn | PNM | 2015 | 2020 | Lopinot/Bon Air West | | |
| Shamfa Cudjoe | PNM | 2015 | 2025 | Tobago West | | |
| Maxie Cuffie | PNM | 2015 | 2020 | La Horquetta/Talparo | | |
| Foster Cummings | PNM | 2020 | 2025 | La Horquetta/Talparo | | |
| Clifton De Coteau | UNC | 2010 | 2015 | Moruga/Tableland | | |
| Alfonso De Lima | PNM | 1971 | 1981 | Port of Spain North East | | |
| Symon de Nobriga | PNM | 2020 | Present | Diego Martin Central | | |
| Hans des Vignes | PNM | 2025 | Present | Diego Martin West | | |
| Leo Des Vignes | NAR | 1986 | 1991 | Diego Martin Central | | |
| Balraj Deosarran | PNM | 1971 | 1976 | Chaguanas | | |
| Terrence Deyalsingh | PNM | 2013 | 2025 | St. Joseph | | |
| Edmund Dillon | PNM | 2015 | 2020 | Point Fortin | | |
| John Donaldson | PNM | 1981 | 1986 | Saint Ann's West | Eden Shand | |
| John Donaldson Sr. | PNM | 1956 | 1961 | Port of Spain North East | | |
| Muriel Donawa-McDavidson | PNM | 1966 | 1976 | Fyzabad | | |
| Muriel Donawa-McDavidson | PNM | 1981 | 1986 | San Juan | | |
| Muriel Donawa-McDavidson | PNM | 1986 | 1991 | Laventille | | |
| Winston Dookeran | ULF | 1981 | 1986 | Chaguanas | | |
| Winston Dookeran | NAR | 1986 | 1991 | Chaguanas | | |
| Winston Dookeran | UNC | 2002 | 2007 | St. Augustine | | |
| Winston Dookeran | COP | 2010 | 2015 | Tunapuna | | |
| Narine Dookie | PNM | 1971 | 1976 | Naparima South | | |
| Lincoln Douglas | COP | 2010 | 2015 | Lopinot/Bon Air West | | |
| Michael Dowlath | UNC | 2025 | Present | San Fernando West | | |
| Gordon Draper | PNM | 1995 | 2000 | Port of Spain North/Saint Ann's West | | |
| Rennie Dumas | PNM | 2007 | 2010 | Tobago East | | |
| John Eckstein | PNM | 1991 | 1995 | Arouca South | | |
| Clyde Elder | UNC | 2025 | Present | La Brea | | |
| Peter Farquhar | DLP | 1961 | 1966 | Pointe-à-Pierre | | |
| Ashton Ford | PNM | 1981 | 1986 | Arima | | |
| Esmond Forde | PNM | 2015 | 2025 | Tunapuna | | |
| Jenson Fox | PNM | 1986 | 1991 | Port of Spain North | | |
| Hugh Francis | PNM | 1976 | 1981 | Diego Martin West | | |
| Lovell Francis | PNM | 2015 | 2020 | Moruga/Tableland | | |
| Bertie Fraser | PNM | 1976 | 1981 | Tunapuna | | |
| Nyan Gadsby-Dolly | PNM | 2015 | Present | Saint Ann's East | | |
| Anthony Garcia | PNM | 2015 | 2020 | Arima | | |
| Vidia Gayadeen-Gopeesingh | UNC | 2015 | 2020 | Oropouche West | | |
| Hugo Ghany | PNM | 1971 | 1976 | Tabaquite | | |
| Albert Gomes | DLP | 1946 | 1956 | Port of Spain North | 1st Chief Minister of Trinidad and Tobago | |
| Carlton Gomes | PNM | 1971 | 1976 | San Juan West | | |
| Carlton Gomes | PNM | 1976 | 1981 | San Juan | | |
| Marvin Gonzales | PNM | 2020 | Present | Lopinot/Bon Air West | | |
| Tim Goopesingh | UNC | 2007 | 2020 | Caroni East | | |
| Paula Gopee-Scoon | PNM | 2007 | 2015 | Point Fortin | | |
| Marilyn Gordon | PNM | 1981 | 1986 | Arouca | | |
| Colin Neil Gosine | UNC | 2025 | Present | Chaguanas West | | |
| Donald Granado | PNM | 1956 | 1966 | Laventille | | |
| Rupert Griffith | PNM | 1986 | 2000 | Arima | | |
| Rupert Griffith | UNC | 2010 | 2015 | Toco/Sangre Grande | | |
| Theodore Guerra | NAR | 1986 | 1991 | Port of Spain South | | |
| Anita Haynes | UNC | 2020 | 2025 | Tabaquite | | |
| Mohammed Haniff | UNC | 1991 | 1995 | Princes Town | | |
| Hansley Hanoomnsingh | DLP | 1966 | 1971 | Caroni East | | |
| Hardeo Hardath | PNM | 1971 | 1986 | Nariva | | |
| Paul Harrison | ULF | 1976 | 1981 | Caroni East | | |
| Edward Hart | PNM | 1991 | 2000 | Tunapuna | | |
| Edward Hart | PNM | 2001 | 2007 | Tunapuna | | |
| Margaret Hector | NAR | 1986 | 1991 | Diego Martin West | | |
| Oswald Hem Lee | NAR | 1986 | 1991 | Pointe-à-Pierre | | |
| Gloria Henry | NAR | 1986 | 1991 | Arouca South | | |
| Fitzgerald Hinds | PNM | 1995 | 2007 | Laventille East/Morvant | | |
| Fitzgerald Hinds | PNM | 2015 | 2025 | Laventille West | | |
| Winston Hinds | PNM | 1976 | 1986 | Pointe-à-Pierre | | |
| Emanuel Hosein | ULF | 1981 | 1986 | Naparima | | |
| Emanuel Hosein | NAR | 1986 | 1991 | Tunapuna | | |
| Saddam Hosein | UNC | 2020 | Present | Barataria/San Juan | | |
| Sahid Hosein | UNC | 1991 | 1995 | Siparia | | |
| Tajmool Hosein | DLP | 1961 | 1966 | Chaguanas | | |
| Alicia Hospedales | PNM | 2007 | 2015 | Arouca/Maloney | | |
| Karl Hudson-Phillips | PNM | 1966 | 1976 | Diego Martin East | | |
| John Humphrey | ULF | 1981 | 1986 | St. Augustine | | |
| John Humphrey | NAR | 1986 | 1991 | St. Augustine | | |
| John Humphrey | UNC | 1991 | 2001 | St. Augustine | | |
| Gary Hunt | PNM | 2007 | 2010 | Port of Spain North/Saint Ann's West | | |
| NiLeung Hypolite | PNM | 2007 | 2015 | Laventille West | | |
| Colm Imbert | PNM | 1991 | 2007 | Diego Martin East | | |
| Colm Imbert | PNM | 2007 | Present | Diego Martin North/East | | |
| Rudranath Indarsingh | UNC | 2010 | 2025 | Couva South | | |
| Vernon Jamadar | DLP | 1961 | 1966 | Fyzabad | | |
| Vernon Jamadar | DLP | 1966 | 1971 | Oropouche | | |
| Eulalie James | PNM | 1995 | 2007 | Laventille West | | |
| Boodram Jattan | ULF | 1976 | 1981 | Naparima | | |
| Fitzgerald Jeffrey | PNM | 2007 | 2015 | La Brea | | |
| Glenda Jennings-Smith | PNM | 2015 | 2020 | Toco/Sangre Grande | | |
| Eudine Job-Davis | PNM | 2001 | 2007 | Tobago East | | |
| Carlos John | UNC | 2000 | 2002 | St. Joseph | | |
| Jearlean John | UNC | 2025 | Present | Couva North | | |
| Cuthbert Johnson | PNM | 1961 | 1966 | Point Fortin | | |
| Jennifer Johnson | NAR | 1986 | 1991 | Princes Town | | |
| Cuthbert Joseph | PNM | 1971 | 1986 | Port of Spain East | | |
| Martin Joseph | PNM | 1995 | 2002 | Saint Ann's East | | |
| Roger Joseph | PNM | 2007 | 2010 | La Horquetta/Talparo | | |
| Roy Joseph | PNM | 1950 | 1956 | San Fernando | | |
| Roy Joseph | PNM | 1958 | 1961 | San Fernando-Naparima | | |
| Krish Jurai | UNC | 1991 | 1995 | Nariva | | |
| Christine Kangaloo | PNM | 2007 | 2010 | Pointe-à-Pierre | President of Trinidad and Tobago (since 2023) | |
| Fazal Karim | UNC | 2015 | 2020 | Chaguanas East | | |
| Ernesto Kesar | UNC | 2025 | Present | Point Fortin | | |
| Franklin Khan | PNM | 2002 | 2007 | Ortoire/Mayaro | | |
| Fuad Khan | UNC | 1995 | 2007 | Barataria/San Juan | | |
| Fuad Khan | UNC | 2010 | 2020 | Barataria/San Juan | | |
| Haffezar Khan | ULF | 1976 | 1981 | St. Augustine | | |
| Nela Khan | UNC | 2010 | 2015 | Princes Town | | |
| Kenneth Lalla | DLP | 1966 | 1971 | Couva | | |
| Joseph Laquis | PNM | 1981 | 1986 | Diego Martin Central | | |
| Vincent Lasse | PNM | 1991 | 2000 | Point Fortin | | |
| Esther Le Gendre | PNM | 2007 | 2010 | Tunapuna | | |
| Alloy Lequay | DLP | 1966 | 1971 | Naparima South | | |
| David Lee | UNC | 2020 | 2025 | Pointe-à-Pierre | | |
| David Lee | UNC | 2025 | Present | Caroni Central | | |
| Ulric Lee | PNM | 1956 | 1961 | Port of Spain North | | |
| Adrian Leonce | PNM | 2015 | 2025 | Laventille East/Morvant | | |
| Norma Lewis-Phillip | PNM | 1976 | 1986 | Diego Martin East | | |
| Gillian Lucky | UNC | 2001 | 2007 | Pointe-à-Pierre | | |
| Ramesh Lutchmedial | ULF | 1976 | 1981 | Chaguanas | | |
| Errol Mahabir | PNM | 1966 | 1976 | San Fernando West | | |
| Winston Mahabir | PNM | 1956 | 1961 | San Fernando West | | |
| Devesh Maharaj | UNC | 2025 | Present | Aranguez/St Joseph | | |
| Stephen Maharaj | DLP | 1961 | 1966 | Princes Town | | |
| Ramesh Maharaj | UNC | 1991 | 2001 | Couva South | | |
| Ramesh Maharaj | UNC | 2007 | 2010 | Tabaquite | | |
| Brian Manning | PNM | 2020 | Present | San Fernando East | | |
| Patrick Manning | PNM | 1971 | 2015 | San Fernando East | Prime Minister of Trinidad and Tobago (1991–1995; 2001–2010) | |
| Ralph Maraj | PNM | 1991 | 1995 | San Fernando West | | |
| Ralph Maraj | UNC | 1995 | 2001 | Naparima | | |
| Kareem Marcelle | PNM | 2025 | Present | Laventille West | | |
| Morris Marshall | PNM | 1986 | 1991 | Port of Spain East | | |
| Morris Marshall | PNM | 1991 | 1995 | Laventille West | | |
| Stephen McClashie | PNM | 2020 | 2025 | La Brea | | |
| Hector McClean | PNM | 1971 | 1976 | Tunapuna | | |
| Hector McClean | PNM | 1976 | 1981 | Arouca | | |
| Marlene McDonald | PNM | 2007 | 2020 | Port of Spain South | | |
| Patricia McIntosh | PNM | 2010 | 2015 | Port of Spain North/Saint Ann's West | | |
| Errol McLeod | ULF | 1976 | 1981 | Oropouche | | |
| Errol McLeod | UNC | 2010 | 2015 | Pointe-à-Pierre | | |
| Randall Mitchell | PNM | 2015 | 2020 | San Fernando East | | |
| Amoy Mohammed | PNM | 1981 | 1986 | Princes Town | | |
| Kamaluddin Mohammed | PNM | 1956 | 1961 | St. Joseph | | |
| Kamaluddin Mohammed | PNM | 1961 | 1986 | Barataria | | |
| Nizam Mohammed | ULF | 1976 | 1981 | Princes Town | | |
| Nizam Mohammed | ULF | 1981 | 1986 | Tabaquite | | |
| Nizam Mohammed | NAR | 1986 | 1991 | Tabaquite | | |
| Reeza Mohammed | UNC | 1995 | 2000 | Princes Town | | |
| Saied Mohammed | PNM | 1961 | 1966 | San Fernando West | | |
| Shamshuddin Mohammed | PNM | 1966 | 1976 | San Juan East | | |
| Shamshuddin Mohammed | PNM | 1976 | 1986 | St. Joseph | | |
| Shamshuddin Mohammed | UNC | 1991 | 1995 | Caroni East | | |
| Vandana Mohit | UNC | 2020 | Present | Chaguanas East | | |
| Roger Monroe | PNM | 2020 | 2025 | Toco/Sangre Grande | | |
| Albert Gerard Montano | PNM | 1956 | 1976 | San Fernando East | | |
| Nathaniel Moore | NAR | 2000 | 2001 | Tobago East | | |
| Roodal Moonilal | UNC | 2001 | 2007 | Oropouche | | |
| Roodal Moonilal | UNC | 2007 | Present | Oropouche East | | |
| Lisa Morris-Julian | PNM | 2020 | 2024 | D'Abadie/O'Meara | | |
| Nicholas Morris | UNC | 2025 | Present | Mayaro | | |
| Wendell Mottley | PNM | 1991 | 1995 | Saint Ann's East | | |
| Nazim Muradali | DLP | 1966 | 1971 | Naparima North | | |
| Winston Murray | DAC | 1976 | 1981 | Tobago West | | |
| Lincoln Myers | NAR | 1986 | 1991 | Saint Ann's East | | |
| Adesh Nanan | UNC | 1995 | 2007 | Tabaquite | | |
| Winston Nanan | ULF | 1976 | 1981 | Tabaquite | | |
| Hansen Narinesingh | UNC | 2025 | Present | Claxton Bay | | |
| Jarrette Narine | PNM | 1991 | 2007 | Arouca North | | |
| Christine Newallo-Hosein | UNC | 2015 | 2020 | Cumuto/Manzanilla | | |
| Pamela Nicholson | DAC | 1981 | 1986 | Tobago East | | |
| Pamela Nicholson | NAR | 1986 | 2000 | Tobago West | | |
| John O'Halloran | PNM | 1956 | 1966 | St. George West | | |
| John O'Halloran | PNM | 1961 | 1966 | Diego Martin | | |
| John O'Halloran | PNM | 1966 | 1971 | Diego Martin West | | |
| James Ogiste | DAC | 1981 | 1986 | Tobago West | | |
| Indra Sinanan Ojah-Maharaj | PNM | 2007 | 2010 | Toco/Sangre Grande | | |
| Nicole Olivierre | PNM | 2015 | 2020 | La Brea | | |
| Barry Padarath | UNC | 2015 | 2025 | Princes Town | | |
| Overand Padmore | PNM | 1971 | 1981 | Port of Spain West | | |
| Overand Padmore | PNM | 1981 | 1986 | Port of Spain North | | |
| Raymond Palackdharrysingh | NAR | 1986 | 1991 | Naparima | | |
| Raymond Palackdharrysingh | UNC | 1991 | 1995 | Caroni Central | | |
| Basdeo Panday | ULF | 1976 | 1986 | Couva North | | |
| Basdeo Panday | NAR | 1986 | 1991 | Couva North | | |
| Basdeo Panday | UNC | 1991 | 2010 | Couva North | | |
| Mickela Panday | UNC | 2007 | 2010 | Oropouche West | | |
| Subhas Panday | UNC | 1991 | 1995 | Naparima | | |
| Subhas Panday | UNC | 2000 | 2007 | Princes Town | | |
| Subhas Panday | UNC | 2007 | 2010 | Princes Town North | | |
| Neil Parsanlal | PNM | 2007 | 2010 | Lopinot/Bon Air West | | |
| Collin Partap | UNC | 2010 | 2015 | Cumuto/Manzanilla | | |
| Harry Partap | UNC | 1995 | 2007 | Nariva | | |
| Harry Partap | UNC | 2007 | 2010 | Cumuto/Manzanilla | | |
| Rushton Paray | UNC | 2015 | 2025 | Mayaro | | |
| Kamla Persad-Bissessar | UNC | 1995 | Present | Siparia | Prime Minister of Trinidad and Tobago (2010–2015) ; (2025-present) | |
| Winston Peters | UNC | 2000 | 2002 | Ortoire/Mayaro | | |
| Winston Peters | UNC | 2007 | 2015 | Mayaro | | |
| Lloyd Phillips | PNM | 1971 | 1976 | Princes Town | | |
| Eric Emmanuel Phipps | PNM | 1966 | 1971 | Laventille | | |
| Benjamin Pitt | PNM | 1961 | 1976 | Tobago West | | |
| Francis Prevatt | PNM | 1966 | 1971 | Port of Spain North East | | |
| Leon Prevatt | PNM | 1981 | 1986 | Ortoire/Mayaro | | |
| Hamza Rafeeq | UNC | 1991 | 2010 | Caroni Central | | |
| Rai Ragbir | UNC | 2020 | Present | Cumuto/Manzanilla | | |
| John Rahael | PNM | 2000 | 2007 | Port of Spain North/Saint Ann's West | | |
| Cyril Rajaram | PNM | 1991 | 1995 | Pointe-à-Pierre | | |
| Arnold Ram | UNC | 2020 | 2025 | Caroni Central | | |
| Prakash Ramadhar | COP | 2010 | 2020 | St. Augustine | | |
| Glenn Ramadharsingh | UNC | 2010 | 2015 | Caroni Central | | |
| Roopnarine Rambachan | DLP | 1966 | 1971 | Siparia | | |
| Surujrattan Rambachan | UNC | 2010 | 2020 | Tabaquite | | |
| Dinesh Rambally | UNC | 2020 | 2025 | Chaguanas West | | |
| Matthew Ramcharan | PNM | 1961 | 1966 | St. Joseph | | |
| Balgobin Ramdeen | DLP | 1961 | 1966 | Caroni East | | |
| Ramona Ramdial | UNC | 2010 | 2020 | Couva North | | |
| Kelvin Ramnath | ULF | 1976 | 1986 | Couva South | | |
| Kelvin Ramnath | NAR | 1986 | 1991 | Couva South | | |
| Kelvin Ramnath | UNC | 2001 | 2010 | Couva South | | |
| Augustus Ramrekersingh | PNM | 1991 | 1995 | St. Joseph | | |
| Manichan Ramsaran | PNM | 1981 | 1986 | Caroni East | | |
| Manohar Ramsaran | UNC | 1995 | 2007 | Chaguanas | | |
| Rawle Raphael | NAR | 1986 | 1991 | Arouca North | | |
| Ravi Ratiram | UNC | 2020 | 2025 | Couva North | | |
| Junia Regrello | PNM | 2007 | 2010 | San Fernando West | | |
| Albert Richards | NAR | 1986 | 1991 | La Brea | | |
| Kennedy Richards | PNM | 2020 | 2025 | Point Fortin | | |
| John Richardson | PNM | 1966 | 1976 | Point Fortin | | |
| Selwyn Richardson | NAR | 1986 | 1991 | Ortoire/Mayaro | | |
| Anil Roberts | COP | 2010 | 2015 | D'Abadie/O'Meara | | |
| Anthony Roberts | PNM | 2002 | 2010 | Saint Ann's East | | |
| Arthur Robinson | PNM | 1961 | 1976 | Tobago East | President of Trinidad and Tobago (1997–2003) | |
| Arthur Robinson | DAC | 1976 | 1981 | Tobago East | President of Trinidad and Tobago (1997–2003) | |
| Arthur Robinson | NAR | 1986 | 2000 | Tobago East | President of Trinidad and Tobago (1997–2003) | |
| Camille Robinson-Regis | PNM | 1995 | 2007 | Arouca South | | |
| Camille Robinson-Regis | PNM | 2015 | Present | Arouca/Maloney | | |
| Lionel Robinson | PNM | 1961 | 1981 | Toco/Manzanilla | | |
| Cyril Rogers | PNM | 1976 | 1986 | Point Fortin | | |
| Dominic Romain | PNM | 2025 | Present | Malabar/Mausica | | |
| Govindra Roopnarine | ULF | 1981 | 1986 | Siparia | | |
| Govindra Roopnarine | NAR | 1986 | 1991 | Siparia | | |
| Narindra Roopnarine | UNC | 2025 | Present | Naparima | | |
| Stacy Roopnarine | UNC | 2010 | 2015 | Oropouche West | | |
| Joseph Ross | PNM | 2007 | 2010 | Barataria/San Juan | | |
| Keith Rowley | PNM | 1991 | 2025 | Diego Martin West | Prime Minister of Trinidad and Tobago (2015–2025) | |
| Shivanna Sam | UNC | 2025 | Present | Cumuto/Manzanilla | | |
| Rodger Samuel | COP | 2010 | 2015 | Arima | | |
| Brinsley Samaroo | NAR | 1986 | 1991 | Nariva | | |
| Joel Sampson | TPP | 2025 | Present | Tobago West | | |
| Arthur Sanderson | NAR | 1986 | 1991 | Fyzabad | | |
| Keith Scotland | PNM | 2020 | Present | Port of Spain South | | |
| John Scott | PNM | 1981 | 1986 | Tunapuna | | |
| Joan Sealey | PNM | 1976 | 1981 | Laventille | | |
| Rishad Seecheran | UNC | 2020 | Present | Caroni East | | |
| Jairam Seemungal | UNC | 2010 | 2015 | La Horquetta/Talparo | | |
| Carolyn Seepersad-Bachan | COP | 2010 | 2015 | San Fernando West | | |
| Diane Seukeran | PNM | 2002 | 2007 | San Fernando West | | |
| Lionel Seukeran | Ind. | 1956 | 1961 | Naparima | | |
| Lionel Seukeran | DLP | 1961 | 1966 | Naparima | | |
| Raffique Shah | ULF | 1976 | 1981 | Siparia | | |
| Shafeyei Mohammed Shah | DLP | 1966 | 1971 | Tabaquite | | |
| Eden Shand | NAR | 1986 | 1991 | Saint Ann's West | | |
| Chandresh Sharma | UNC | 1991 | 2015 | Fyzabad | | |
| Ashford Sinanan | PDP | 1956 | 1961 | Pointe-à-Pierre | | |
| Ashford Sinanan | DLP | 1961 | 1966 | Siparia | | |
| Barendra Sinanan | PNM | 1995 | 2000 | San Fernando West | | |
| Mitra Sinanan | PDP | 1956 | 1961 | Caroni Central | | |
| Carl Singh | PDP | 1991 | 1995 | Tabaquite | | |
| Dhanraj Singh | UNC | 1995 | 2000 | Pointe-à-Pierre | | |
| Ganga Singh | UNC | 1995 | 2007 | Caroni East | | |
| Ganga Singh | UNC | 2015 | 2020 | Chaguanas West | | |
| Anthony Smart | NAR | 1986 | 1991 | Diego Martin East | | |
| Daryl Smith | PNM | 2015 | 2020 | Diego Martin Central | | |
| Sean Sobers | UNC | 2025 | Present | Tabaquite | | |
| Keith Sobion | PNM | 1991 | 1995 | Ortoire/Mayaro | | |
| Patrick Solomon | PNM | 1956 | 1961 | Port of Spain South | | |
| Patrick Solomon | PNM | 1961 | 1966 | Port of Spain West | | |
| Anselm St. George | NAR | 1986 | 1991 | San Fernando West | | |
| Frank Vincent Stephen | PNM | 1966 | 1976 | St. Joseph | | |
| Wayne Sturge | UNC | 2025 | Present | Toco/Sangre Grande | | |
| Trevor Sudama | ULF | 1981 | 1986 | Oropouche | | |
| Trevor Sudama | NAR | 1986 | 1991 | Oropouche | | |
| Trevor Sudama | UNC | 1991 | 2001 | Oropouche | | |
| Doveton Sullivan | PNM | 1971 | 1976 | Naparima North | | |
| Kennedy Swaratsingh | PNM | 2007 | 2010 | St. Joseph | | |
| Davendranath Tancoo | UNC | 2020 | 2025 | Oropouche West | | |
| Davendranath Tancoo | UNC | 2025 | Present | Fyzabad | | |
| Peter Taylor | PNM | 2007 | 2010 | Princes Town South/Tableland | | |
| Isabel Ursula Teshea | PNM | 1961 | 1971 | Port of Spain East | | |
| Bhoendradatt Tewarie | NAR | 1986 | 1991 | Caroni East | | |
| Bhoendradatt Tewarie | UNC | 2015 | 2020 | Caroni Central | | |
| David Thomas | TPP | 2025 | Present | Tobago East | | |
| Joanne Thomas | PNM | 2010 | 2015 | Saint Ann's East | | |
| Arnold Thomasos | PNM | 1956 | 1961 | St. George East | Speaker of the House of Representatives (1961–1981) | |
| Arnold Thomasos | PNM | 1961 | 1966 | Arima | Speaker of the House of Representatives (1961–1981) | |
| Gloria Thomasos-Pollard | NAR | 1986 | 1991 | Arima | | |
| Alfred Thompson | PNM | 1961 | 1971 | Tunapuna | | |
| Joseph Toney | NAR | 1986 | 1991 | Toco/Manzanilla | | |
| Kenneth Valley | PNM | 1991 | 2007 | Diego Martin Central | | |
| Herbert Volney | UNC | 2010 | 2013 | St. Joseph | | |
| Robert Wallace | PNM | 1956 | 1966 | San Juan | | |
| Robert Wallace | PNM | 1966 | 1971 | San Juan West | | |
| Jack Warner | UNC | 2007 | 2015 | Chaguanas West | | |
| Phillip Watts | UNC | 2025 | Present | La Horquetta/Talparo | | |
| Ayanna Webster-Roy | PNM | 2015 | 2025 | Tobago East | | |
| Cedric Weeks | PNM | 1971 | 1976 | Pointe-à-Pierre | | |
| Lilias Wight | DLP | 1966 | 1971 | Pointe-à-Pierre | | |
| Eric A. Williams | PNM | 1995 | 2007 | Port of Spain South | | |
| Eric E. Williams | PNM | 1956 | 1961 | Port of Spain South East | Prime Minister of Trinidad and Tobago (1962–1981) | |
| Eric E. Williams | PNM | 1961 | 1981 | Port of Spain South | Prime Minister of Trinidad and Tobago (1962–1981) | |
| George Williams | PNM | 1971 | 1976 | Oropouche | | |
| Ronald Williams | PNM | 1981 | 1986 | Port of Spain South | | |
| Winston Williams | PNM | 1976 | 1986 | Fyzabad | | |
| Selby Wilson | NAR | 1986 | 1991 | Point Fortin | | |
| Gerald Yetming | UNC | 2001 | 2002 | St. Augustine | | |
| Gerald Yetming | UNC | 2002 | 2007 | St. Joseph | | |
| Stuart Young | PNM | 2015 | Present | Port of Spain North/Saint Ann's West | Prime Minister of Trinidad and Tobago (2025) | |

== See also ==
- List of parliaments of Trinidad and Tobago
- List of MPs for constituencies in Tobago
