= Leader of the Opposition (Trinidad and Tobago) =

Parliamentary position of Trinidad and Tobago

Leader of the Opposition of the Republic of Trinidad and Tobago
- Coat of arms of Trinidad and Tobago

- Flag of Trinidad and Tobago

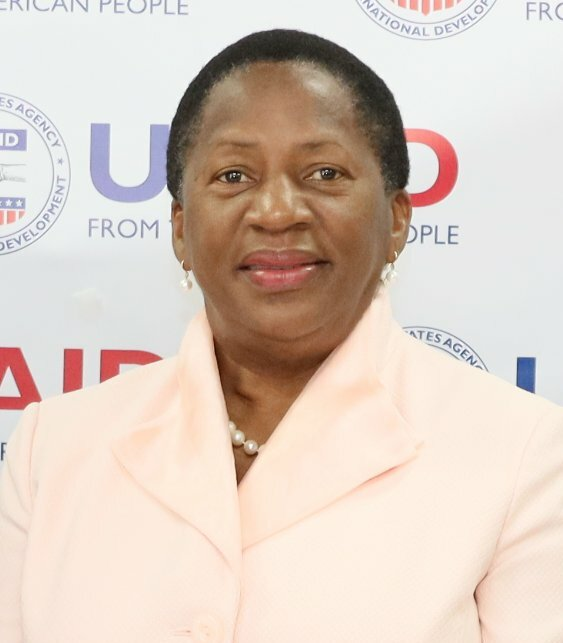
- Incumbent; Pennelope Beckles-Robinson since 6 May 2025; 16 months ago
- Official Opposition; Parliament of Trinidad and Tobago; Leader of the Opposition's Office
- Style: The Honorable (formal); Leader of the Opposition (spoken)
- Member of: House of Representatives of Trinidad and Tobago; Shadow Cabinet
- Reports to: Parliament of Trinidad and Tobago
- Seat: Office of the Leader of the Opposition, Chloe Building, 11 Charles Street, Port of Spain, Trinidad and Tobago
- Nominator: House of Representatives of Trinidad and Tobago
- Appointer: President of Trinidad and Tobago
- Term length: While leader of the largest political party in the House of Representatives that is not in government
- Constituting instrument: Constitution of Trinidad and Tobago
- Inaugural holder: Ashford Sastri Sinanan (Legislative Council); Rudranath Capildeo (Independent Parliament); Basdeo Panday (Republican Parliament)
- Formation: 31 August 1962; 64 years ago
- Salary: TT$355,080 per annum (2019)
- Website: www.ttparliament.org/members.php?mid=24

The Leader of the Opposition (officially the Leader of the Opposition of the Republic of Trinidad and Tobago) is the leader of the largest political party in the House of Representatives that is not in government.

The Leader of the Opposition is a member of the House of Representatives, and is appointed by the President of Trinidad and Tobago.

The current Leader of the Opposition is Pennelope Beckles-Robinson.

== Leaders of the Opposition of Trinidad and Tobago ==
DLP (3) ULF (2) UNC (2) PNM (3) Independent (2) PDP (1)
Opposition Leader			Term of office Duration in years and days		Parliament	Party	Election	Head of Government; Chief Minister (1950-1959); Premier (1959-1962); Prime Minister (1962-present)
No.	Portrait	Opposition Leader (birth–death) Constituency	Took office	Left office	Parliament	Party	Election	Head of Government; Chief Minister (1950-1959); Premier (1959-1962); Prime Minister (1962-present)
1		Ashford Sastri Sinanan (1923–1994) Member for Victoria South	1951	1956	8th Legislative Council (1950–1956)	Independent	1950	Albert Gomes (1950–1956) as Chief Minister
		Bhadase Sagan Maraj (1920–1971) Member for Caroni North Acting Opposition Leaders during Maraj's term: A. P. T. James (1959); Simbhoonath Capildeo (1959-1961)	26 October 1956	21 September 1961	9th Legislative Council (1956–1961)	People's Democratic Party (1956-1957)	1956	Eric Williams (1956–1981) as Chief Minister (1956–1959), as Premier (1959–1962), as Prime Minister (1962–1981)
2		Bhadase Sagan Maraj (1920–1971) Member for Caroni North Acting Opposition Leaders during Maraj's term: A. P. T. James (1959); Simbhoonath Capildeo (1959-1961)	4 years, 330 days		9th Legislative Council (1956–1961)	Democratic Labour Party (1957-1961)	1956	Eric Williams (1956–1981) as Chief Minister (1956–1959), as Premier (1959–1962), as Prime Minister (1962–1981)
1		Rudranath Capildeo (1920–1970) MP for Saint Augustine (1961–1966) MP for Chaguanas (1966–1967) Acting Opposition Leaders during Capildeo's term: Ashford Sastri Sinanan (1962); Stephen Carpoondeo Maharaj (1963–1965); Simbhoonath Capildeo (1965); Vernon Jamadar (1965–1967)	29 December 1961	June 1967	1st Independent Parliament (1961–1966)	Democratic Labour Party	1961	Eric Williams (1956–1981) as Chief Minister (1956–1959), as Premier (1959–1962), as Prime Minister (1962–1981)
1		Rudranath Capildeo (1920–1970) MP for Saint Augustine (1961–1966) MP for Chaguanas (1966–1967) Acting Opposition Leaders during Capildeo's term: Ashford Sastri Sinanan (1962); Stephen Carpoondeo Maharaj (1963–1965); Simbhoonath Capildeo (1965); Vernon Jamadar (1965–1967)	29 December 1961	June 1967	2nd Independent Parliament (1966–1967)	Democratic Labour Party	1966	Eric Williams (1956–1981) as Chief Minister (1956–1959), as Premier (1959–1962), as Prime Minister (1962–1981)
1		Rudranath Capildeo (1920–1970) MP for Saint Augustine (1961–1966) MP for Chaguanas (1966–1967) Acting Opposition Leaders during Capildeo's term: Ashford Sastri Sinanan (1962); Stephen Carpoondeo Maharaj (1963–1965); Simbhoonath Capildeo (1965); Vernon Jamadar (1965–1967)	5 years, 4 months		2nd Independent Parliament (1966–1967)	Democratic Labour Party	1966	Eric Williams (1956–1981) as Chief Minister (1956–1959), as Premier (1959–1962), as Prime Minister (1962–1981)
2		Vernon Jamadar (1929–2002) MP for Oropouche	July 1967	1971	2nd Independent Parliament (1967–1971)	Democratic Labour Party	—	Eric Williams (1956–1981) as Chief Minister (1956–1959), as Premier (1959–1962), as Prime Minister (1962–1981)
3		John R.F. Richardson (1926–2001) MP for Point Fortin	21 July 1972	19 June 1976	3rd Independent Parliament (1972–1976)	Independent	1971 (Note: Originally elected as MP for Point Fortin under the PNM in 1971, but became an independent in July 1972 and was appointed Leader of the Opposition, as thus he was the only non-PNM member of the House of Representatives, as the DLP had protested the 1971 election and only the PNM won.)	Eric Williams (1956–1981) as Chief Minister (1956–1959), as Premier (1959–1962), as Prime Minister (1962–1981)
3		John R.F. Richardson (1926–2001) MP for Point Fortin	3 years, 334 days		3rd Independent Parliament (1972–1976)	Independent	1971	Eric Williams (1956–1981) as Chief Minister (1956–1959), as Premier (1959–1962), as Prime Minister (1962–1981)
4		Basdeo Panday (1933–2024) MP for Couva North	1976	1977	1st Republican Parliament (1976–1977)	United Labour Front	1976	Eric Williams (1956–1981) as Chief Minister (1956–1959), as Premier (1959–1962), as Prime Minister (1962–1981)
5		Raffique Shah (born 1946) MP for Siparia	9 August 1977	31 March 1978	1st Republican Parliament (1977–1978)	United Labour Front	—	Eric Williams (1956–1981) as Chief Minister (1956–1959), as Premier (1959–1962), as Prime Minister (1962–1981)
5		Raffique Shah (born 1946) MP for Siparia	234 days		1st Republican Parliament (1977–1978)	United Labour Front	—	Eric Williams (1956–1981) as Chief Minister (1956–1959), as Premier (1959–1962), as Prime Minister (1962–1981)
(4)		Basdeo Panday (1933–2024) MP for Couva North	1978	1986	1st Republican Parliament (1978–1981)	United Labour Front	—	Eric Williams (1956–1981) as Chief Minister (1956–1959), as Premier (1959–1962), as Prime Minister (1962–1981)
(4)		Basdeo Panday (1933–2024) MP for Couva North	1978	1986	2nd Republican Parliament (1981–1986)	United Labour Front	1981	George Chambers (1981–1986)
6		Patrick Manning (1946–2016) MP for San Fernando East	1986	1990	2nd Republican Parliament (1986)	People's National Movement	1986	A. N. R. Robinson (1986–1991)
6		Patrick Manning (1946–2016) MP for San Fernando East			3rd Republican Parliament (1987–1990)	People's National Movement	1986	A. N. R. Robinson (1986–1991)
(4)		Basdeo Panday (1933–2024) MP for Couva North	1990	6 November 1995	3rd Republican Parliament (1990–1991)	United National Congress	1991	Patrick Manning (1991–1995)
(4)		Basdeo Panday (1933–2024) MP for Couva North			4th Republican Parliament (1992–1995)	United National Congress	1991	Patrick Manning (1991–1995)
(6)		Patrick Manning (1946–2016) MP for San Fernando East	6 November 1995	24 December 2001	5th Republican Parliament (1995–2000)	People's National Movement	1995	Basdeo Panday (1995–2001)
(6)		Patrick Manning (1946–2016) MP for San Fernando East	6 November 1995	24 December 2001	6th Republican Parliament (2001)	People's National Movement	2000	Basdeo Panday (1995–2001)
(6)		Patrick Manning (1946–2016) MP for San Fernando East	2 years, 109 days		6th Republican Parliament (2001)	People's National Movement	2000	Basdeo Panday (1995–2001)
(4)		Basdeo Panday (1933–2024) MP for Couva North	24 December 2001	26 April 2006	7th Republican Parliament (2002)	United National Congress	2001	Patrick Manning (2001–2010)
(4)		Basdeo Panday (1933–2024) MP for Couva North	24 December 2001	26 April 2006	8th Republican Parliament (2002–2006)	United National Congress	2002	Patrick Manning (2001–2010)
(4)		Basdeo Panday (1933–2024) MP for Couva North	4 years, 123 days		8th Republican Parliament (2002–2006)	United National Congress	2002	Patrick Manning (2001–2010)
7		Kamla Persad-Bissessar (born 1952) MP for Siparia	26 April 2006	8 November 2007	9th Republican Parliament (2007–2010)	United National Congress	2007	Patrick Manning (2001–2010)
7		Kamla Persad-Bissessar (born 1952) MP for Siparia	1 year, 196 days		9th Republican Parliament (2007–2010)	United National Congress	2007	Patrick Manning (2001–2010)
(4)		Basdeo Panday (1933–2024) MP for Couva North	8 November 2007	25 February 2010	9th Republican Parliament (2007–2010)	United National Congress	—	Patrick Manning (2001–2010)
(4)		Basdeo Panday (1933–2024) MP for Couva North	2 years, 109 days		9th Republican Parliament (2007–2010)	United National Congress	—	Patrick Manning (2001–2010)
(7)		Kamla Persad-Bissessar (born 1952) MP for Siparia	25 February 2010	26 May 2010	9th Republican Parliament (2007–2010)	United National Congress	—	Patrick Manning (2001–2010)
(7)		Kamla Persad-Bissessar (born 1952) MP for Siparia	90 days		9th Republican Parliament (2007–2010)	United National Congress	—	Patrick Manning (2001–2010)
8		Keith Rowley (born 1949) MP for Diego Martin West	26 May 2010	9 September 2015	10th Republican Parliament (2010–2015)	People's National Movement	2010	Kamla Persad-Bissessar (2010–2015)
8		Keith Rowley (born 1949) MP for Diego Martin West	5 years, 106 days		10th Republican Parliament (2010–2015)	People's National Movement	2010	Kamla Persad-Bissessar (2010–2015)
(7)		Kamla Persad-Bissessar (born 1952) MP for Siparia	9 September 2015	1 May 2025	11th Republican Parliament (2015–2020)	United National Congress	2015	Keith Rowley (2015–2025)
(7)		Kamla Persad-Bissessar (born 1952) MP for Siparia	5 years, 106 days		12th Republican Parliament (2020–2025)	United National Congress	2020	Stuart Young (2025)
9		Pennelope Beckles-Robinson (born 1961) MP for Arima	6 May 2025	Incumbent	13th Republican Parliament (2025–presen)	People's National Movement	2025	Kamla Persad-Bissessar (2025–present)
9		Pennelope Beckles-Robinson (born 1961) MP for Arima	1 year, 124 days		13th Republican Parliament (2025–presen)	People's National Movement	2025	Kamla Persad-Bissessar (2025–present)

== See also ==
- Politics of Trinidad and Tobago
- President of Trinidad and Tobago
- List of prime ministers of Trinidad and Tobago
