= List of parliaments of Trinidad and Tobago =

This is a list of parliaments in Trinidad and Tobago.

Diagram	Assembly sessions	Election	From: To:	Governing party	Prime Minister	Official opposition party	Leader of the Opposition Party	Speakers of the House Date Elected
	1st Independent Parliament	10th general	29 December 1961 – 25 August 1966	People's National Movement	Eric Williams	Democratic Labour Party	Rudranath Capildeo (1961–1963)	Clytus Arnold Thomasos (29 December 1961)
	2nd Independent Parliament	11th general	25 November 1966 – 22 April 1971	People's National Movement	Eric Williams	Democratic Labour Party	Rudranath Capildeo (1966–1967); Vernon Jamadar (1969)	Clytus Arnold Thomasos
	3rd Independent Parliament	12th general	18 June 1971 – 19 June 1976	People's National Movement	Eric Williams	Democratic Labour Party	Vernon Jamadar (1971); Alloy Lequay (1972–1976)	Clytus Arnold Thomasos
	1st Republican Parliament	13th general	24 September 1976 – 18 September 1981	People's National Movement	Eric Williams George Chambers	United Labour Front	Basdeo Panday Raffique Shah	Clytus Arnold Thomasos
	2nd Republican Parliament	14th general	27 November 1981 – 29 November 1986	People's National Movement	George Chambers	United Labour Front	Basdeo Panday	Matthew Ramcharan (27 November 1981)
	3rd Republican Parliament	15th general	12 January 1987 – 19 November 1991	National Alliance for Reconstruction	A. N. R. Robinson	People's National Movement	Patrick Manning	Nizam Mohammed (12 January 1987)
	4th Republican Parliament	16th general	13 January 1992 – 6 October 1995	People's National Movement	Patrick Manning	United National Congress	Basdeo Panday	Occah Seepaul (12 January 1987)
	5th Republican Parliament	17th general	27 November 1995 – 3 November 2000	United National Congress and National Alliance for Reconstruction (Government of National Unity comprising the following)	Basdeo Panday	People's National Movement	Patrick Manning	Hector McClean (27 November 1995)
	6th Republican Parliament	18th general	12 January 2001 – 9 October 2001	United National Congress	Basdeo Panday	People's National Movement	Patrick Manning	Rupert Griffith (12 January 2001)
	7th Republican Parliament	19th general	5 April 2002 – 28 August 2002	People's National Movement	Patrick Manning (Appointed by The President in accordance with the Constitution of the Republic of Trinidad and Tobago Act – Chapter 1:01 Section 76 (1))	United National Congress	Basdeo Panday	Rupert Griffith
	8th Republican Parliament	20th general	17 October 2002 – 28 September 2007	People's National Movement	Patrick Manning	United National Congress	Basdeo Panday	Barendra Sinanan (17 October 2002)
	9th Republican Parliament	21st general	17 December 2007 – 8 April 2010	People's National Movement	Patrick Manning	United National Congress – Alliance	Basdeo Panday (10 September 2006 – 24 January 2010) Kamla Persad-Bissessar (24 January 2010)	Barendra Sinanan (17 December 2007)
	10th Republican Parliament	22nd general	18 June 2010 – 17 June 2015	People's Partnership: United National Congress; Congress of the People; Tobago Organisation of the People	Kamla Persad-Bissessar	People's National Movement	Patrick Manning (19 December 1986 – 26 May 2010) Keith Rowley (26 May 2010)	Wade Mark (18 June 2010)
	11th Republican Parliament	23rd general	23 September 2015 – 3 July 2020	People's National Movement	Keith Rowley	People's Partnership Coalition	Kamla Persad-Bissessar	Bridgid Annisette-George (23 September 2015)
	12th Republican Parliament	24th general	28 August 2020 – 18 March 2025	People's National Movement	Keith Rowley Stuart Young	United National Congress	Kamla Persad-Bissessar	Bridgid Annisette-George (28 August 2020)
	13th Republican Parliament	25th general	2025 –	United National Congress	Kamla Persad-Bissessar	People's National Movement	Pennelope Beckles	Jagdeo Singh

== See also ==
- Parliament of Trinidad and Tobago
- List of Trinidad and Tobago MPs
