= Chaguanas (parliamentary constituency) =

Constituency in Trinidad, 1961 to 2007

- Former constituency for the Parliament of Trinidad and Tobago
- Electorate: 28,347 (2002)
- Major settlements: Chaguanas

Former constituency
- Created: 1961
- Abolished: 2007
- Seats: 1

Chaguanas was a parliamentary constituency in Trinidad and Tobago from 1961 to 2007, when the seat was divided into Chaguanas East and Chaguanas West.

== Geography ==
The constituency contained the town of Chaguanas and had an electorate of 28,347 as of 2002.

== Members ==
Constituency created
Election	Member	Party	Notes
1961	Tajmool Hosein	DLP	
1966	Rudranath Capildeo	DLP	
1968 (by-election)	Bhadase Sagan Maraj	Independent	
1971	Balraj Deosarran	PNM	
1976	Ramesh Lutchmedial	ULF	
1981	Winston Dookeran	ULF	
1986	Winston Dookeran	NAR	
1991	Hulsie Bhaggan	UNC	
1995	Manohar Ramsaran	UNC	
2000	Manohar Ramsaran	UNC	
2001	Manohar Ramsaran	UNC	
2002	Manohar Ramsaran	UNC	
Constituency divided into Chaguanas East and Chaguanas West

== See also ==
- Constituencies of the Parliament of Trinidad and Tobago
