= National Alliance for Reconstruction administration =

The National Alliance for Reconstruction administration for the Cabinet of Trinidad and Tobago was assembled after the 1986 general election. The National Alliance for Reconstruction won 33 of the 36 seats.

== Cabinet reshuffle: 18 December 1986 – 27 November 1987 ==
Cabinet of Trinidad and Tobago
Portfolio	Minister
Minister of Finance and the Economy	A.N.R. Robinson
Minister of Justice and National Security	Selwyn Richardson
Minister of National Security	Herbert Atwell
Minister of Education	Clive Pantin
Minister of Works, Infrastructure and Decentralization	Carson Charles
Minister of Works, Settlements and Infrastructure	John Humphrey
Minister of Health, Welfare and Status of Women	Emanuel Hosein
Minister of Industry, Enterprise and Tourism	Bhoendradatt Tewarie
Minister of Planning and Reconstruction	Winston Dookeran
Minister of Energy	Kelvin Ramnath
Minister of Labour, Employment and Manpower Resources	Albert Richards
Minister of Youth, Sport, Culture and the Creative Arts	Jennifer Johnson
Minister of Food Production, Marine Exploitation, Forestry and the Environment	Lincoln Myers
Minister of Industry and Enterprise	Kenneth Gordon

== See also ==
- Politics of Trinidad and Tobago
