= Gloria Henry (politician) =

Trinidad and Tobago politician

Member of Parliament for Arouca South
- In office 15 December 1986 – 16 December 1991
- Preceded by: constituency established
- Succeeded by: John Eckstein

Personal details
- Party: National Alliance for Reconstruction

Gloria Henry was a Trinidad and Tobago politician from the National Alliance for Reconstruction.

== Career ==
She was elected in the 1986 Trinidad and Tobago general election for the constituency of Arouca South. She was the only non-People's National Movement candidate to win the seat. In the National Alliance for Reconstruction administration she served as a government minister. She witnessed the Jamaat al Muslimeen coup attempt in 1990. She was succeeded by John Eckstein in the 1991 general election.

== See also ==
- List of Trinidad and Tobago Members of Parliament
