= Siparia (parliamentary constituency) =

Trinidad and Tobago parliamentary constituency

- Constituency for the Parliament of Trinidad and Tobago
- Electorate: 27,920 (2015)

Current constituency
- Created: 1961
- Number of members: 1
- Member of Parliament: Kamla Persad-Bissessar (UNC)

Siparia is a parliamentary electoral district in Trinidad and Tobago in the south of Trinidad. It has been represented since 1995 by Kamla Persad-Bissessar of the United National Congress.

== Constituency profile ==
The constituency was created prior to the 1961 general election. It borders the constituencies of Moruga/Tableland, La Brea, Oropouche East, Oropouche West, Naparima and Fyzabad. The main towns are Siparia, Penal, Sadhoowa, Mendez, and Morne Diablo. It had an electorate of 27,920 as of 2015.

== Members of Parliament ==
This constituency has elected the following members of the House of Representatives of Trinidad and Tobago:

Election	Years	Member	Party	Notes
1961	4 December 1961 – 7 November 1966	Ashford Sinanan	DLP	
1966	7 November 1966 – 24 May 1971	Roopnarine Rambachan	DLP	
1971	24 May 1971 – 13 September 1976	Horace Paul Charles	PNM	
1976	13 September 1976 – 9 November 1981	Raffique Shah	ULF	
1981	9 November 1981 – 15 December 1986	Govindra Roopnarine	ULF	
1986	15 December 1986 – 16 December 1991	Govindra Roopnarine	NAR	
1991	16 December 1991 – 6 November 1995	Sahid Hosein	UNC	
1995	6 November 1995 – Present	Kamla Persad-Bissessar	UNC	

== Election results ==
=== Elections in the 2020s ===
2025 Trinidad and Tobago general election: Siparia
Party	Candidate	Votes	%	±%
UNC	Kamla Persad-Bissessar	13,900	83.0%	▲
PNM	Natasha Mohammed	2,412	14.4%	▼
PF	Judy Sookdeo	374	2.2%	Steady
Majority		11,488	68.6%	
Turnout		16,740	57.53%	
Registered electors		29,096		
UNC hold		Swing	%	

General election 2020: Siparia
Party	Candidate	Votes	%	±%
UNC	Kamla Persad-Bissessar	13,487	77.77	
PNM	Rebecca Jessica Dipnarine	3,855	22.23	
Majority		9,632	55.54	
Turnout		17,342	60.5	
UNC hold		Swing		

=== Elections in the 2010s ===
General election 2015: Siparia
Party	Candidate	Votes	%	±%
UNC	Kamla Persad-Bissessar	14,896	75.8	
PNM	Vidya Deokiesingh	4,755	24.2	
Majority		10,141	51.61	
Turnout		19,651	70.38	
UNC hold		Swing		

General election 2010: Siparia
Party	Candidate	Votes	%	±%
UNC	Kamla Persad-Bissessar	15,650	78.62	
PNM	Vidya Deokiesingh	4,175	20.97	
Majority		11,475	57.64	
Turnout		19,907	74.68	
UNC hold		Swing		
