= Couva (parliamentary constituency) =

Constituency in Trinidad, 1961 to 2007

- Former constituency for the Parliament of Trinidad and Tobago
- Electorate: 12,211 (1971)
- Major settlements: Couva

Former constituency
- Created: 1961
- Abolished: 1976
- Seats: 1

Couva was a parliamentary constituency in Trinidad and Tobago which existed from 1961 to 1976, when the seat was divided between Couva North and Couva South.

== Geography ==
The constituency contained the town of Couva. It had an electorate of 12,211 as of 1971.

== Members ==
Constituency created
Election	Member	Party	Notes
1961	Simbhonath Capildeo	DLP	
1966	Kenneth Lalla	DLP	
1971	Yahir Kassim Ali	PNM	
Constituency divided into Couva North and Couva South

== See also ==
- Constituencies of the Parliament of Trinidad and Tobago
