= Couva South =

Trinidad and Tobago electoral district

- Constituency for the Parliament of Trinidad and Tobago
- Region: Couva–Tabaquite–Talparo
- Electorate: 30,348 (2020)

Current constituency
- Created: 1976
- Number of members: One
- Member of Parliament: Barry Padarath (UNC)
- Created from: Couva

Couva South is a parliamentary electoral district in the town of Couva.

Couva South consists of the southern part of Couva. It came into effect in time for the 1976 Trinidad and Tobago general election.

== Members of Parliament ==
This constituency has elected the following members of the House of Representatives of Trinidad and Tobago:

Election	Years	Member	Party	Notes
ULF	13 September 1976–15 December 1986	Kelvin Ramnath	ULF	
NAR	15 December 1986–16 December 1991	Kelvin Ramnath	NAR	
1991	16 December 1991–10 December 2001	Ramesh Maharaj	UNC	
2001	10 December 2001–24 May 2010	Kelvin Ramnath	UNC	
2010	24 May 2010–2025	Rudranath Indarsingh	UNC	
2025	2025–present	Barry Padarath	UNC	

== Election results ==
=== Elections in the 2020s ===
2025 Trinidad and Tobago general election: Couva South
Party	Candidate	Votes	%	±%
UNC	Barry Padarath	13,122	73.4%	▲
PNM	Aaron Mohammed	3,763	21.0%	▼
PF	Imran Gokool	955	5.3%	Steady
Majority		9,359	52.4%	▲
Turnout		17,881	57.73%	
Registered electors		30,975		
UNC hold				

General election 2020: Couva South
Party	Candidate	Votes	%	±%
UNC	Rudranath Indarsingh	12,597	68.91	
PNM	Rajendra Rampersad	5,542	30.31	
THC	Linnell Doolan	106	0.58	
Rejected ballots		36	0.2	
Turnout		18,281	60.24	
Majority		7,055	38.6	
Registered electors		30,348		
UNC hold		Swing		

=== Elections in the 2010s ===
General election 2015: Couva South
Party	Candidate	Votes	%	±%
UNC	Rudranath Indarsingh	13,889	68.81	
PNM	Alif Rodney Mohammed	6,070	30.07	
ILP	Kelly Dingoor	177	0.87	
Rejected ballots		50	0.25	
Turnout		20,186	70.83	
Majority		7,819	38.74	
Registered electors		28,499		
UNC hold		Swing		

General election 2010: Couva South
Party	Candidate	Votes	%	±%
UNC	Rudranath Indarsingh	15,045	75.7	
PNM	Anthony Khan	4,773	24.01	
Rejected ballots		59	0.29	
Turnout		19,877	75.29	
Majority		10,272	51.69	
Registered electors		26,400		
UNC hold		Swing		

== See also ==
- Couva North
