= 2010 Trinidad and Tobago general election =

Congressional elections for all 41 seats

- 24 May 2010

All 41 seats in the House of Representatives
- Turnout: 69.88% (▲3.66pp)
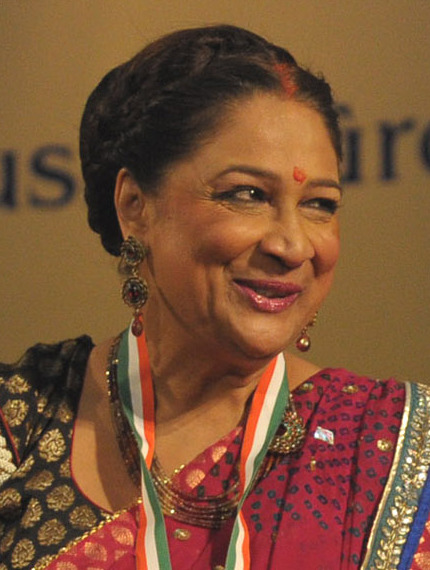

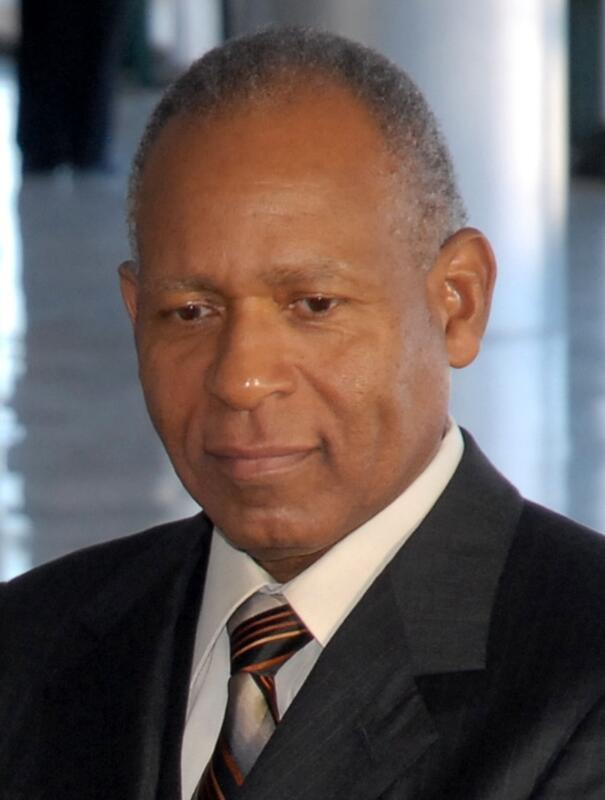

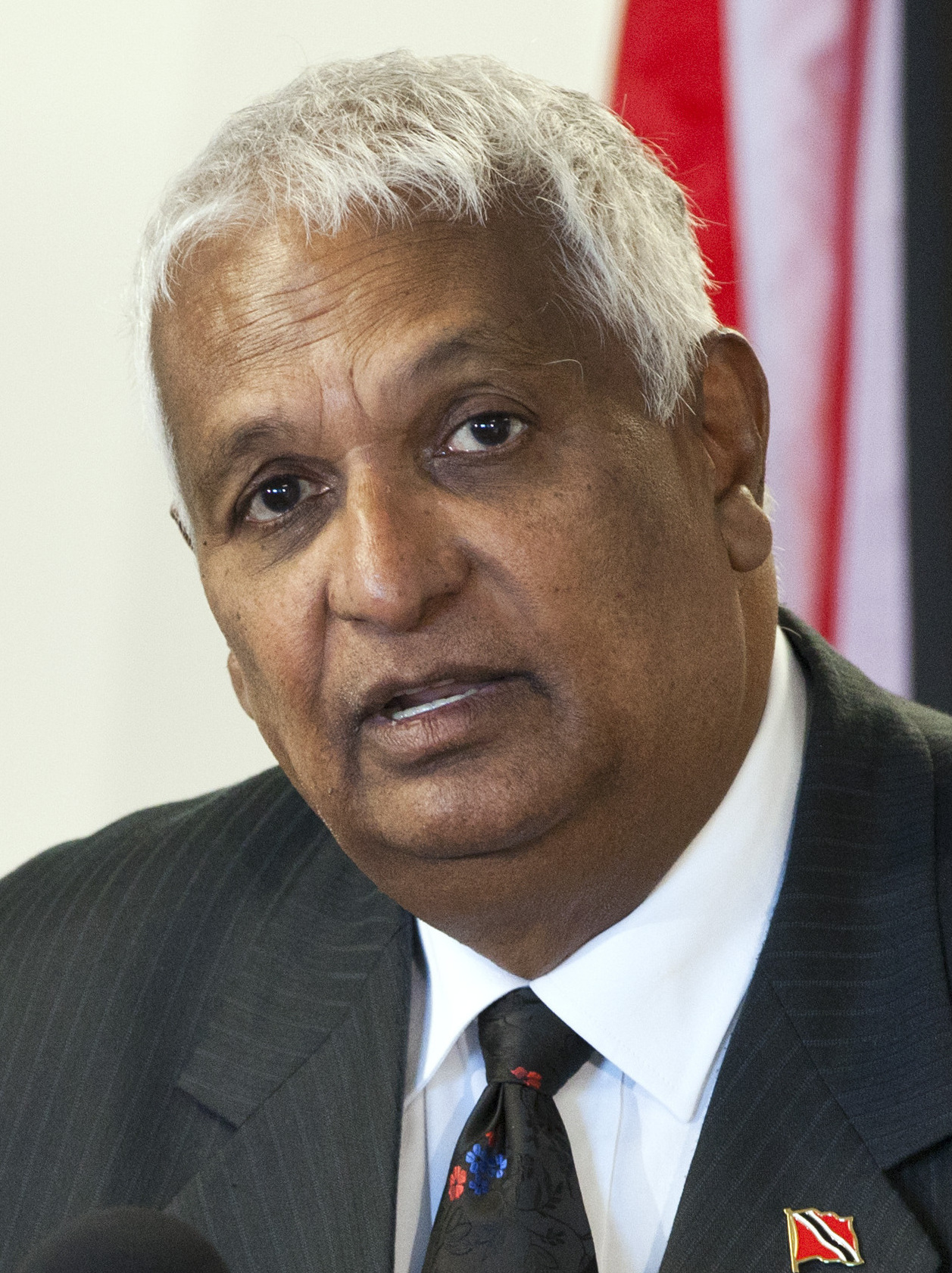
	First party	Second party
Leader	Kamla Persad-Bissessar	Patrick Manning
Party	UNC	PNM
Alliance	PP
Last election	29.85%, 15 seats	45.99%, 26 seats
Seats won	21	12
Seat change	▲6	▼14
Popular vote	316,600	287,458
Percentage	43.72%	39.70%
Swing	▲13.87pp	▼6.29pp
	Third party	Fourth party
		TOP
Leader	Winston Dookeran	Ashworth Jack
Party	COP	TOP
Alliance	PP	PP
Last election	22.71%, 0 seats	–
Seats won	6	2
Seat change	▲6	New
Popular vote	102,265	15,371
Percentage	14.12%	2.12%
Swing	▼8.59pp	New
Prime Minister before election
Patrick Manning
PNM
Subsequent Prime Minister
Kamla Persad-Bissessar
UNC

General elections were held in Trinidad and Tobago on 24 May 2010. The date of the general elections was announced by Prime Minister Patrick Manning on April 16, 2010, via a press release. The election was called over two years earlier than required by law. Polls showing that the UNC-led opposition coalition was likely to win the election were confirmed by the subsequent results.

With preliminary results showing the People's Partnership coalition likely to win a majority of 29 out of a possible 41 seats, Patrick Manning conceded defeat on election night. The final outcome has the People's Partnership winning 29 seats, and the PNM winning 12 seats. As a consequence of the People's Partnership's win, Kamla Persad-Bissessar of the People's Partnership coalition was elected Trinidad and Tobago's first female prime minister.

In 2015 former minister and international football executive Jack Warner alleged financial connections between himself, world football and the conduct of the 2010 general election.

== Background ==
The 2007 general elections awarded 26 of the 41 seats in the House of Representatives to the People's National Movement (PNM) and 15 to the United National Congress-Alliance (UNC-A). Despite receiving almost 23% of the votes cast, the Congress of the People (COP) received no seats. Several smaller parties, including the Tobago United Front/Democratic Action Congress, also failed to secure any seats. PNM leader Patrick Manning retained the position of Prime Minister, while UNC-A leader Basdeo Panday remained Leader of the Opposition.

These were the first elections for a House which had been expanded from 36 seats to 41. Previous elections were mostly decided by five marginal seats—Barataria/San Juan, Mayaro, San Fernando West, St. Joseph and Tunapuna. The 2007 election raised the number of marginal seats to 10, with Chaguanas East, Lopinot/Bon Air West, Princes Town South/Tableland (renamed Moruga/Tableland for the 2010 election), Pointe-à-Pierre and Tobago East ending up among the marginals.

== Candidates ==
7 April 2010, was the start of screening of 41 new candidates for the People's National Movement. The screening began in Manning's San Fernando East constituency, with the other 40 electoral districts following. April 13, 2010, was the start of screening for the United National Congress. Screening for the UNC-A was held at the party's headquarters at the Rienzi Complex in Couva. Screening for the Congress of the People began on 1 April 2010. Nomination day for the election was 3 May 2010.

== Campaigning ==
Do So! was the name of a political campaign orchestrated by Cambridge Analytica for the United National Congress during the election in order to convince youth members of the Afro–Trinidadians and Tobagonians to not vote.

== Conduct ==
In 2015 former minister and football executive Austin "Jack" Warner said that he had documents linking the outcome of the general election with himself and the finances of football's world governing body, FIFA.

Warner made the claims in a paid national television political broadcast, saying that his life was in danger, that he had given the documents to lawyers, and, "I will no longer keep secrets for them who actively seek to destroy the country."

== Results ==
The election was won by the People's Partnership coalition, causing Kamla Persad-Bissessar of the UNC to be the country's first female prime minister. Persad-Bissessar's coalition won 29 of 41 seats, causing incumbent prime minister Patrick Manning to concede defeat. Manning's PNM was reduced to 12 seats. In her victory speech, Persad-Bissessar stated: "The honor you've given me is without parallel ... I accept it with deep honor and gratitude."

Party	Votes	%	Seats	+/–
United National Congress (PP)	316,600	43.72	21	+6
People's National Movement	287,458	39.70	12	–14
Congress of the People (PP)	102,265	14.12	6	+6
Tobago Organisation of the People (PP)	15,371	2.12	2	New
New National Vision	2,098	0.29	0	New
Trinidad and Tobago National Congress Party	29	0.00	0	New
Independents	314	0.04	0	0
**Total**	**724,135**	**100.00**	**41**	**0**
Valid votes	724,135	99.63		
Invalid/blank votes	2,691	0.37		
Total votes	**726,826**	**100.00**		
Registered voters/turnout	1,040,128	69.88		
Source: EBCTT, Caribbean Elections

=== By constituency ===
Winning candidates are in bold.

Constituency	People's Partnership	PNM	Other parties
Arima	**Rodger Samuel** (COP)	Laurel Lezama-Lee Sing	Justin Gibbs (NNV)
Arouca/Maloney	Anna Maria Mora (COP)	**Alicia Hospedales**	John Enoch (Independent)
Barataria/San Juan	**Fuad Khan** (UNC)	Joseph Ross	
Caroni Central	**Glenn Ramadharsingh** (UNC)	Sheila Madoo-Kurban	
Caroni East	**Tim Gopeesingh** (UNC)	Harold Ramoutar	
Chaguanas East	**Stephen Cadiz** (UNC)	Mustapha Abdul-Hamid	Prakash Persad (NNV)
Chaguanas West	**Austin "Jack" Warner** (UNC)	Ronald Heera	
Couva North	**Ramona Ramdial** (UNC)	Nal Ramsingh	
Couva South	**Rudy Indarsingh** (UNC)	Anthony Khan	
Cumuto/Manzanilla	**Collin Partap** (UNC)	Darryl Mahabir	Krish Jurai (Independent)
D'Abadie/O'Meara	**Anil Roberts** (COP)	Karen Nunez-Tesheira	
Diego Martin Central	Nicole Dyer-Griffith (COP)	**Amery Browne**	Nigel Telesford (NNV)
Diego Martin North/East	Garvin Nicholas (UNC)	**Colm Imbert**	Melissa Ochoa (NNV)
Diego Martin West	Rocky Garcia (COP)	**Keith Rowley**	Saaleha Zawadi Abu Bakr (NNV)
Fyzabad	**Chandresh Sharma** (UNC)	Joel Primus	
La Brea	Ernesto Kesar (UNC)	**Fitzgerald Jeffrey**	Lorris Ballack (NNV)
La Horquetta/Talparo	**Jairam Seemungal** (UNC)	Nadra Nathai-Gyan	Ramesh Maharaj (TTNCP); Sookram Ali (Independent)
Laventille East/Morvant	Kwasi Mutema (COP)	**Donna Cox**	Umar Khan
Laventille West	Makandal Daaga (COP)	**NiLeung Hypolite**	
Lopinot/Bon Air West	**Lincoln Douglas** (COP)	Neil Parsanlal	
Mayaro	**Winston "Gypsy" Peters** (UNC)	Clifford Campbell	
Moruga/Tableland	**Clifton De Coteau** (UNC)	Augustus Thomas	
Naparima	**Nizam Baksh** (UNC)	Faiz Ramjohn	
Oropouche East	**Roodal Moonilal** (UNC)	Christin Ramdial	
Oropouche West	**Stacy Roopnarine** (UNC)	Heather Sedeno-Walker	
Point Fortin	Nyahuma Obika (COP)	**Paula Gopee-Scoon**	
Pointe-a-Pierre	**Errol McLeod** (UNC)	Christine Kangaloo	
Port of Spain North/St. Anns West	Annabelle Davis (UNC)	**Patricia McIntosh**	Fuad Abu Bakr (NNV)
Port of Spain South	Gizelle Russel (COP)	**Marlene McDonald**	Travis Mulraine (NNV)
Princes Town	**Nela Khan** (UNC)	Anwarie Ramkissoon	
San Fernando East	Carol Cuffy-Dowlat (COP)	**Patrick Manning**	
San Fernado West	**Carolyn Seepersad-Bachan** (COP)	Junia Regrello	Indrani Maharaj-Abu Bakr
Siparia	**Kamla Persad-Bissessar** (UNC)	Vidya Deokiesingh	
St. Anns East	Verna St. Rose Greaves (UNC)	**Joanne Thomas**	Christian Dookie (NNV)
St. Augustine	**Prakash Ramadhar** (COP)	Balchandra Sharma	
St. Joseph	**Herbert Volney** (UNC)	Kennedy Swaratsingh	Marcus Ramkissoon (Independent)
Tabaquite	**Suruj Rambachan** (UNC)	Farouk Mohammed	
Tobago East	**Vernella Alleyne-Toppin** (TOP)	Gizel Thomas-Roberts	
Tobago West	**Delmon Baker** (TOP)	Terrence Williams	
Toco/Sangre Grande	**Rupert Griffith** (UNC)	Eric "Pink Panther" Taylor	Neil De Silva (NNV)
Tunapuna	**Winston Dookeran** (COP)	Esther Le Gendre	

== See also ==
- Do So!
