= Constituencies of the Parliament of Trinidad and Tobago =

House of Representatives of Trinidad and Tobago
- 12th Republican Parliament

Type
- Type: Lower house of the Parliament of Trinidad and Tobago
- Seats: 41

Elections
- Voting system: First-past-the-post
- Last election: 10 August 2020
- Next election: 2025

Meeting place
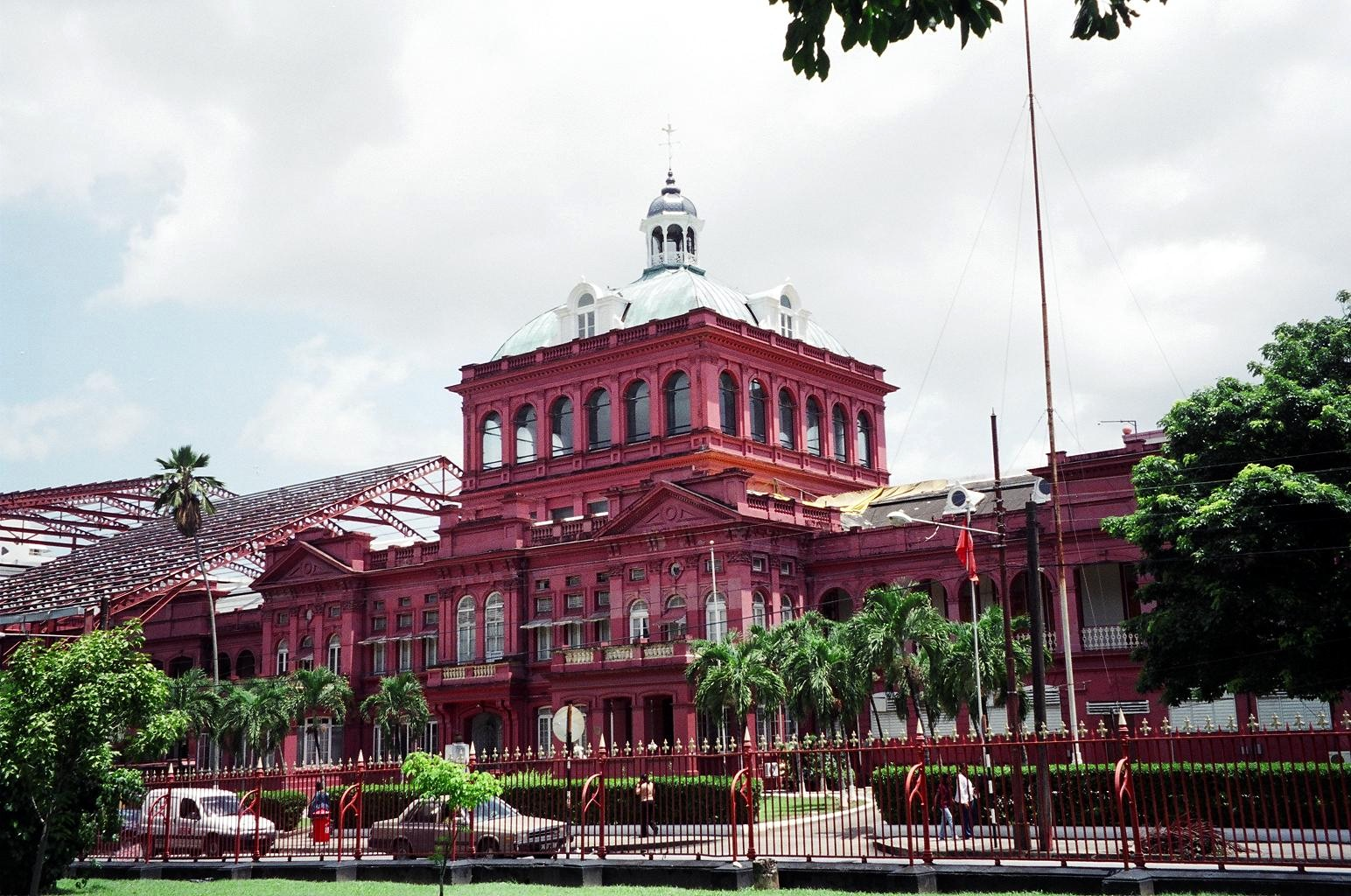
- The Red House, Abercromby Street, Downtown, Port of Spain, Trinidad and Tobago

Website
- www.ttparliament.org

The House of Representatives is the lower house of the bicameral Parliament of Trinidad and Tobago, the southernmost island country in the Caribbean. It sits at the Red House and has 41 members, each elected to represent single-seat constituencies. The members are elected with a five-year term, but may be dissolved earlier by the President if so advised by the Prime Minister.

== Constituencies ==
Constituencies of the Parliament of Trinidad and Tobago (pre-2025)

Constituencies of the House of Representatives of Trinidad and Tobago
No.	Name	Number of polling divisions (2020)	Electorate (2020)
1	Arima	40	26,384
2	Arouca/Maloney	24	26,673
3	Barataria/San Juan	47	25.690
4	Caroni Central	33	30.107
5	Caroni East	26	29,031
6	Chaguanas East	32	26,923
7	Chaguanas West	30	28,625
8	Couva North	37	29,864
9	Couva South	43	30,348
10	Cumuto/Manzanilla	54	30,468
11	D'Abadie/O'Meara	32	30,788
12	Diego Martin Central	42	29,609
13	Diego Martin North/East	42	29,272
14	Diego Martin West	48	29,886
15	Fyzabad	39	27,447
16	La Brea	38	26,008
17	La Horquetta/Talparo	29	27,527
18	Laventille East/Morvant	39	26,644
19	Laventille West	26	25,585
20	Lopinot/Bon Air West	29	27,864
21	Mayaro	45	28,834
22	Naparima	42	27,066
23	Oropouche East	35	28,271
24	Oropouche West	33	25,289
25	Point Fortin	48	26,003
26	Pointe-à-Pierre	31	25,096
27	Port of Spain North/St. Ann's West	62	25,003
28	Port of Spain South	63	24,754
29	Princes Town	34	27,178
30	Moruga/Tableland	35	29,043
31	San Fernando East	43	25,008
32	San Fernando West	59	25,035
33	Siparia	34	28,663
34	St. Ann's East	41	29,454
35	St. Augustine	40	28,094
36	St. Joseph	43	28,452
37	Tabaquite	38	28,832
38	Tobago East	32	23,103
39	Tobago West	35	27,686
40	Toco/Sangre Grande	38	31,096
41	Tunapuna	36	27,433
Total		1597	1,134,136

== Former constituencies ==
- Chaguanas
- Princes Town North
- Princes Town South/Tableland

== See also ==
- Lists of electoral districts by nation
