= Lady Young Road =

Coordinates: 10.6677°N 61.4852°W

The Lady Young Road is a major roadway in Trinidad and Tobago linking the Eastern Main Road in Barataria to the Queen's Park Savannah in Port of Spain. It is also an important connector between the Churchill-Roosevelt Highway and uptown Port of Spain.

The Lady Young Road runs through Morvant and crosses the foothills of the Northern Range. Named for the wife of Governor Hubert Winthrop Young, the road is known for its views of Port of Spain and its harbour. The road is one of the three main links between Port-of Spain and Morvant, others being Old Morvant Hill Road and the Beetham Highway.

The road is known for its tight curves and hard gradients due to the hill's treacherous curves. Drivers are advised to take caution when using this road, as these curves must be travelled cautiously. Cars have been known to fall off the hill, being fatal in most cases.

A landslide occurred on the road in 2018 that closed it for a period of time, which also almost resulted in the death of politician Joanne Thomas.
