= Lincoln Myers =

Trinidad and Tobago politician (1946–2016)

Minister of Food Production, Marine Exploitation, Forestry and the Environment
- In office 18 December 1986 – 17 December 1991
- President: Sir Ellis Clarke; Noor Hassanali
- Prime Minister: A. N. R. Robinson

Member of Parliament for Saint Ann's East
- In office 18 December 1986 – 17 December 1991
- Preceded by: George Chambers
- Succeeded by: Wendell Mottley

Personal details
- Born: Lincoln Wakefield Myers; 25 March 1946 Palo Seco, Trinidad and Tobago
- Died: 15 March 2016 (aged 69) Gran Couva, Trinidad and Tobago
- Party: National Alliance for Reconstruction; Tapia House Movement
- Education: University of Miami; Miami-Dade College

Lincoln Myers (25 March 1946 - 15 March 2016) was a Trinidad and Tobago politician and member of the National Alliance for Reconstruction (NAR). He served as the Environment and National Service minister of Trinidad and Tobago, and member of the House of Representatives for St Ann's East constituency from 1986 to 1991.

He died at his home in Gran Couva on 15 March 2016 and was survived by his wife, Joy Persad-Myers.

== See also ==
- List of Trinidad and Tobago Members of Parliament
