= African National Congress (Trinidad and Tobago) =

Former political party in Trinidad and Tobago

The African National Congress was a political party in Trinidad and Tobago. The party first contested national elections in 1961, when it received just 0.5% of the vote and failed to win a seat. They did not put forward any candidates for the 1966 elections, but returned for the 1971 elections, in which the party received 2% of the vote, but again failed to win a seat as the People's National Movement won all 36. The party did not contest any further national elections.
