= National Democratic Organisation =

Political party in Trinidad and Tobago

The National Democratic Organisation was a political party in Trinidad and Tobago. It contested the 2001 general elections, received just 50 votes and failed to win a seat. The party did not contest any further elections.
