= Leo Des Vignes =

Trinidad and Tobago politician

Leo Des Vignes was a Trinidad and Tobago politician. He served as Member of Parliament for the constituency of Diego Martin Central from 12 January 1987 until his death on 1 August 1990. He had won the seat during the general election of 1986. He also served as a Parliamentary Secretary during that time. He was a member of the National Alliance for Reconstruction.

He was injured during the Jamaat al Muslimeen coup attempt on 27 July 1990 and was admitted to hospital. He died of his injuries on 1 August.
