= Joan Sealey =

Trinidad and Tobago politician

The Honourable Joan Sealey MP

Member of Parliament for Laventille
- In office 24 September 1976 – 18 September 1981
- Preceded by: Desmond H. Cartay
- Succeeded by: Eric Emmanuel Phipps

Personal details
- Party: People's National Movement (PNM)

Joan Sealey (died September 1996) was a Trinidad and Tobago politician from the People's National Movement (PNM).

== See also ==
- List of Trinidad and Tobago Members of Parliament
