= People's Popular Movement =

The People's Popular Movement was a political party in Trinidad and Tobago. It contested the 1986 general elections, but received just 796 votes and failed to win a seat. The party did not contest any further elections.
