= Hardeo Hardath =

Trinidadian politician

Member of Parliament, House of Representatives
- In office 1971–1986
- Constituency: Nariva

Personal details
- Born: 9 March 1938 Biche, Trinidad and Tobago
- Died: 2012 (aged 73–74)
- Party: People's National Movement

Hardeo Hardath (9 March 1938 – 2012) was a Trinidadian politician who served as a member of the House of Representatives from 1971 to 1986, where he represented Nariva.

== Background ==
Hardath was born in Biche. He began his career as an insurance underwriter.

A member of the People's National Movement, he was first elected as MP in 1971, and chose not to stand for reelection in 1986 after "a stinging attack on the Party leadership". Hardath had complained that his constituency, and Indian party members as well, did not get the attention they deserved from the PNM. Raffique Shah, columnist for the Trinidad and Tobago News, said that Hardath "opened his mouth in Parliament only when he yawned".
