= Winston Dookeran =

Trinidadian and Tobagonian politician and economist

Winston Dookeran ORTT
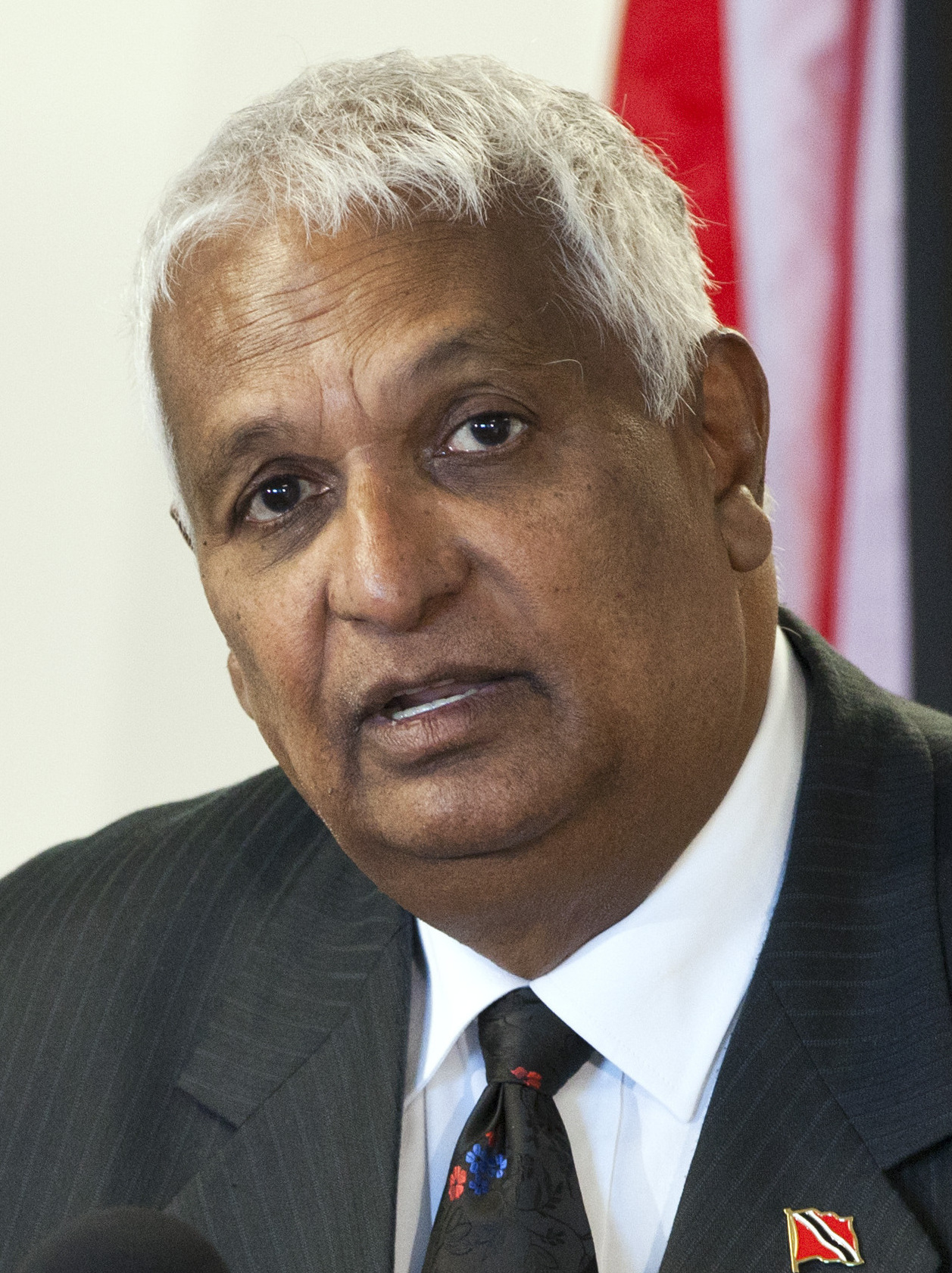
- Dookeran in November 2013

Secretary-General of EUCLID
- Incumbent
- Assumed office 1 July 2020
- Preceded by: Syed Zahid Ali

Minister of Foreign Affairs of Trinidad and Tobago
- In office 22 June 2012 – 17 June 2015
- Prime Minister: Kamla Persad-Bissessar
- Preceded by: Surujrattan Rambachan
- Succeeded by: Dennis Moses

Minister of Finance of Trinidad and Tobago
- In office 28 May 2010 – 22 June 2012
- Prime Minister: Kamla Persad-Bissessar
- Preceded by: Karen Nunez-Tesheira
- Succeeded by: Larry Howai

Leader of the Congress of the People
- In office 10 September 2006 – 3 July 2011
- Preceded by: Office established
- Succeeded by: Prakash Ramadhar

Political Leader United National Congress
- In office 2 October 2005 – 10 September 2006
- Preceded by: Basdeo Panday
- Succeeded by: Basdeo Panday

Governor of the Central Bank of Trinidad and Tobago
- In office 1997–2002
- Preceded by: Thomas Ainsworth Harewood
- Succeeded by: Ewart S. Williams

Personal details
- Born: Winston Chandarbhan Dookeran; 24 June 1943 (age 83) Rio Claro, Trinidad and Tobago
- Party: Congress of the People (2006-present)
- Other political affiliations: United National Congress (2002-2006); National Alliance for Reconstruction (1986-2002); United Labour Front (1981-1986)
- Education: University of Manitoba; London School of Economics
- Website: winstondookeran.com

Winston Chandarbhan Dookeran ORTT (pronounced [viⁿsʈənə cəⁿd̪rəbʰɑːnə d̪ukərənə]; born 24 June 1943) is a Trinidadian and Tobagonian politician and economist as well as international public official. Dookeran is the current secretary-general of EUCLID, an intergovernmental institution of higher learning. He previously served as political leader of the Congress of the People, central bank governor, minister of finance, and minister of foreign affairs.

== Early life ==
Born in 1943, in Rio Claro, Trinidad and Tobago to an Indo-Trinidadian family, he is one of the seven children of Mewalal and Sumintra Dookeran. Dookeran received his early education in Trinidad.

== Education ==
The young Winston Dookeran attended Naparima College in San Fernando, Trinidad. He then went on to attend the University of Manitoba, Winnipeg, Manitoba, Canada, where he graduated with a Bachelor of Arts (Honours) in economics in 1966. It was there that Dookeran made his first entry into politics and he served as the president of the University of Manitoba Students' Union.

He subsequently attended the London School of Economics, where he obtained his master's degree in economics in 1969.

== Economist and politician ==
Dookeran spent some fifteen years as a lecturer in the Department of Economics at the University of the West Indies. In 1981 he contested the constituency of Chaguanas as a candidate of the United Labour Front (ULF). He was victorious at the polls and was therefore elected as a Member of Parliament and served in the House of Representatives of Trinidad and Tobago.

in 1986, when the ULF merged with other parties to form the National Alliance for Reconstruction (NAR), Dookeran again contested the constituency of Chaguanas, and won. Under the leadership of Arthur Napoleon Raymond Robinson, the NAR had massive success at the polls, winning an unprecedented 33 of the 36 constituencies. Dookeran was made a Cabinet member as he was appointed Minister of Planning and Mobilization.

Dookeran later became Deputy Political Leader of the NAR was a senior member of the government, and acted on several occasions as Prime Minister, most notably during the attempted coup of 1990 when Prime Minister A. N. R. Robinson was held hostage by the Jamaat al Muslimeen.

Dookeran lost his seat in the 1991 elections.

He later became Senior Economist at the United Nations Economic Commission for Latin America and the Caribbean (UNECLAC). He was also a member of the executive board of the Inter-American Development Bank (IADB) and the governor of the Caribbean Development Bank (CDB).

In July 1997 he was appointed as governor of the Central Bank of Trinidad and Tobago. He held that post till 2002. Later that year he joined the United National Congress and won the St Augustine constituency. In October 2005 he succeeded Basdeo Panday as political leader of the United National Congress after being nominated by Panday unopposed. Dookeran would later form his own political party, the Congress of the People (COP), which in coalition with his former party would contest and win the May 2010 snap elections.

Dookeran was appointed Minister of Finance in 2010 for the new People's Partnership coalition government and began a series of programs designed to jump-start the stagnant economy. His stewardship was confirmed by Standard and Poor's rating of Trinidad and Tobago as AA− with a stable outlook in December 2011. In June 2012, Dookeran was appointed Minister of Foreign Affairs, a portfolio he held until June 2015.

== International public official and educator ==
After his political career, Dookeran became a Professor of Practice at the University of the West Indies (Saint Augustine Campus) and consultant for international organizations. He became Under-Secretary-General of EUCLID (Euclid University) in 2019 and was appointed as secretary-general in July 2020.

== Publications ==
- Leadership and Governance in Small States. Getting Development Right, Co-edited with Akhil Malaki.
- Identities, State and Markets: Looking at Social Change in Latin America. Edited by Jose Havet, published by Canadian Scholars' Press, Inc., 1999.
- The New Regionalism: Caribbean – Canada Trade Agenda (co-authored with Miriam L. Campanella).
- The Caribbean Quest: Directions for Structural Reforms in a Global Economy. Guest joint editor, Special Issue Vol XXVIII: 1–2, Nordic Journal of Latin American and Caribbean Studies. Published by The Institute of Latin American Studies, Stockholm University, 1999.
- Choices and Change: Reflections on the Caribbean. Published by the International Development Bank and Johns Hopkins University Press. July 1996.
- Crisis and Promise in the Caribbean: Politics and Convergence. Routledge. 2016. ISBN 978-1-317-15774-8.

Financial Reporting in the Caribbean's Public Sector Assessment and Challenges

Winston Dookeran and David Walker (2010) in Studies in Accounting, Finance and Management by Bhattacharyya, Udaybhanu (ed.), Netaji Subhas Open University, Kolkata, India. web: http://www.wbnsou.ac.in/bulletin_board/publications/other_publications/other/studiesinacctfinmangdetails12052011.pdf

Preceded by Basdeo Panday	Political Leader of the United National Congress; 2005–2006	Succeeded by Basdeo Panday
