= George Chambers =

Prime Minister of Trinidad and Tobago from 1981 to 1986

The Honourable George Chambers ORTT
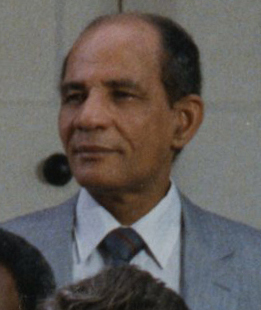
- Chambers in 1986

2nd Prime Minister of Trinidad and Tobago
- In office 30 March 1981 – 18 December 1986
- President: Ellis Clarke
- Preceded by: Eric Williams
- Succeeded by: A. N. R. Robinson

Minister of Finance
- In office 1971–1974
- Prime Minister: Eric Williams
- Preceded by: Eric Williams
- Succeeded by: Eric Williams
- In office 30 March 1981 – 18 December 1986
- Prime Minister: himself
- Preceded by: Eric Williams
- Succeeded by: A. N. R. Robinson

Personal details
- Born: George Michael Chambers; 4 October 1928 Port of Spain, Trinidad and Tobago
- Died: 4 November 1997 (aged 69) Port of Spain, Trinidad and Tobago
- Party: People's National Movement

George Michael Chambers ORTT (4 October 1928 – 4 November 1997) was a Trinidadian politician who served as the 2nd Prime Minister of Trinidad and Tobago from 1981 to 1986. He was a member of the People's National Movement and sat in the House of Representatives representing Saint Ann's East from 1956 to 1986. He held multiple ministerial positions under Prime Minister Eric Williams.

== Early life and education ==
George Michael Chambers was born in Port of Spain, Trinidad and Tobago, on 4 October 1928, to George Chambers and Ruby Noel. His grandmother was from Martinique. He was educated at the Nelson Street Boys Roman Catholic School, Burke's College, and Osmond High School. Chambers worked for the Hamel Smith and Company and the Dominion Oil Company.

== Career ==
Chambers joined the People's National Movement (PNM) in 1956. He was elected to the Legislative Council of Trinidad and Tobago for Saint Ann's East in the 1966 election.

Prime Minister Eric Williams appointed Chambers as one of PNM's three deputy leaders on 26 September 1971. Chambers was the deputy leader for policy matters, Errol Mahabir was deputy leader for party and election matters, and Kamaluddin Mohammed was deputy leader for legislative matters. Chambers was of African descent while Mahabir and Mohammed were of east Asian descent. Williams offered to resign on 28 September 1973, but remained in office at the urging of Chambers.

Chambers served as the Minister of Finance from 1971 to 1974, and from 1981 to 1986. Under Williams he was the minister of Public Utilities, Housing, National Security, Education, Planning, Industry and Commerce, and Agriculture.

== Prime Minister ==
Williams died in office on 29 March 1981. Chambers was selected by PNM chair Francis Prevatt to fill in for Williams until the party selected a new leader at its convention. President Ellis Clarke appointed Chambers as prime minister on 30 March. He remained acting leader of the PNM until he was elected without opposition on May 9.

The PNM won 26 seats in the 1981 election, the party's best performance in a contested election. Membership in PNM reached a new height in 1982, as it had 220,000 members.

Chambers was more conciliatory to the People's Revolutionary Government of Grenada than the rest of the Caribbean. He was critical of the United States for invading Grenada without informing Caribbean nations.

Texaco's assets in Trinidad and Tobago were bought out under Chambers. The country financially benefited from this acquisition in the 1990s.

Trinidad and Tobago suffered from economic issues under Chambers and its GDP declined as oil prices fell. The PNM only won 3 seats in the 1986 election and Chambers lost his seat to Lincoln Myers of the National Alliance for Reconstruction. This was the first time that the PNM lost a general election.

== Later life ==
Following the 1986 election Chambers resigned as leader of the PNM and retired from politics. He was allegedly an advisor for Prime Minister Patrick Manning, but this was never confirmed.

== Personal life ==
Chambers married Juliana Jacobs, with whom he had one child, in 1956. He died in Port-of-Spain on 4 November 1997 after undergoing surgery for prostate cancer. The Order of the Republic of Trinidad and Tobago was awarded to Chambers in 2012.

== Works cited ==
=== News ===
- "George Chambers, 69, Trinidad Politician". The New York Times. 15 November 1997. Archived from the original on 19 December 2024.
- Aziz, Sharon (29 August 2025). "2nd Prime Minister , The Honourable George Chambers (1928-1997)". Trinidad Express Newspapers. Archived from the original on 17 May 2026.
- Ford, Ashton (19 January 2022). "His lasting legacy". Trinidad Express Newspapers. Archived from the original on 17 May 2026.
- Payne, Anthony (15 November 1997). "Obituary: George Chambers". The Independent. Archived from the original on 17 May 2026.

=== Web ===
- "Former Ministers of Finance". Ministry of Finance. Archived from the original on 21 February 2014.
- "George Chambers" (PDF). Parliament of Trinidad and Tobago. Archived (PDF) from the original on 17 May 2026.
- "George Michael Chambers 1928-1977 A Profile". National Library and Information System. Archived from the original on 14 October 2006.

Preceded by Eric Williams	Prime Minister of Trinidad and Tobago; 1981–1986	Succeeded by A. N. R. Robinson
