= Couva North =

Electoral district in Couva, Trinidad

- Constituency for the Parliament of Trinidad and Tobago
- Region: Couva–Tabaquite–Talparo
- Electorate: 29,864 (2020)

Current constituency
- Created: 1976
- Number of members: One
- Member of Parliament: Jearlean John (UNC)
- Created from: Couva

Couva North is a parliamentary electoral district in the town of Couva.

Couva North consists of the northern part of Couva. It came into effect in time for the 1976 Trinidad and Tobago general election.

== Members of Parliament ==
This constituency has elected the following members of the House of Representatives of Trinidad and Tobago:

Election	Years	Member	Party	Notes
1976	13 September 1976–15 December 1986	Basdeo Panday	ULF	
1986	15 December 1986–16 December 1991	Basdeo Panday	NAR	
1991	16 December 1991–24 May 2010	Basdeo Panday	UNC	
2010	24 May 2010–10 August 2020	Ramona Ramdial	UNC	
2020	10 August 2020–28 April 2025	Ravi Ratiram	UNC	
2025	28 April 2025–present	Jearlean John	UNC	

== Election results ==
=== Elections in the 2020s ===
2025 Trinidad and Tobago general election: Couva North
Party	Candidate	Votes	%	±%
UNC	Jearlean John	13,201	73.1%	▲
PNM	Brent Maraj	3,094	17.1%	▼
PF	Mickela Panday	1,727	9.6%	Steady
Majority		10,107	56.0%	▲
Turnout		18,064	58.88%	
Registered electors		30,681		
UNC hold				

General election 2020: Couva North
Party	Candidate	Votes	%	±%
UNC	Ravi Ratiram	12,633	69.27	
PNM	Sharda Satram	5,222	28.63	
PEP	Rohanie Debideen	259	1.42	
COP	Joel Ramdhanie	99	0.54	
Rejected ballots		25	0.14	
Turnout		18,238	61.07	
Majority		7,411	40.64	
Registered electors		29,864		
UNC hold		Swing		

=== Elections in the 2010s ===
General election 2015: Couva North
Party	Candidate	Votes	%	±%
UNC	Ramona Ramdial	13,845	66.51	
PNM	Richard Ragoonanan	6,749	32.42	
ILP	Sunil Youdha Ramjitsingh	176	0.85	
Rejected ballots		46	0.22	
Turnout		20,816	71.08	
Majority		7,096	34.09	
Registered electors		29,284		
UNC hold		Swing		

General election 2010: Couva North
Party	Candidate	Votes	%	±%
UNC	Ramona Ramdial	16,057	75.43	
PNM	Nal Ramsingh	5,159	24.24	
Rejected ballots		70	0.33	
Turnout		21,286	76.9	
Majority		10,898	54.19	
Registered electors		27,680		
UNC hold		Swing		

== See also ==
Couva South
