= Joanne Thomas =

Trinidad and Tobago politician

The Honourable Joanne Thomas MP

Member of Parliament for Saint Ann's East
- In office 24 May 2010 – 17 June 2015
- Preceded by: Anthony Roberts
- Succeeded by: Nyan Gadsby-Dolly

Personal details
- Party: People's National Movement (PNM)

Joanne Thomas is a Trinidad and Tobago politician who was a Member of Parliament of the Republic of Trinidad and Tobago from the People's National Movement (PNM).

== Career ==
Thomas was first elected in the 2010 Trinidad and Tobago general election. She is a long-time community advocate.

== See also ==
- List of Trinidad and Tobago Members of Parliament
