= 2002 Trinidad and Tobago general election =

- 7 October 2002

All 36 seats in the House of Representatives 19 seats needed for a majority
- Turnout: 69.64% (▲3.51 pp)
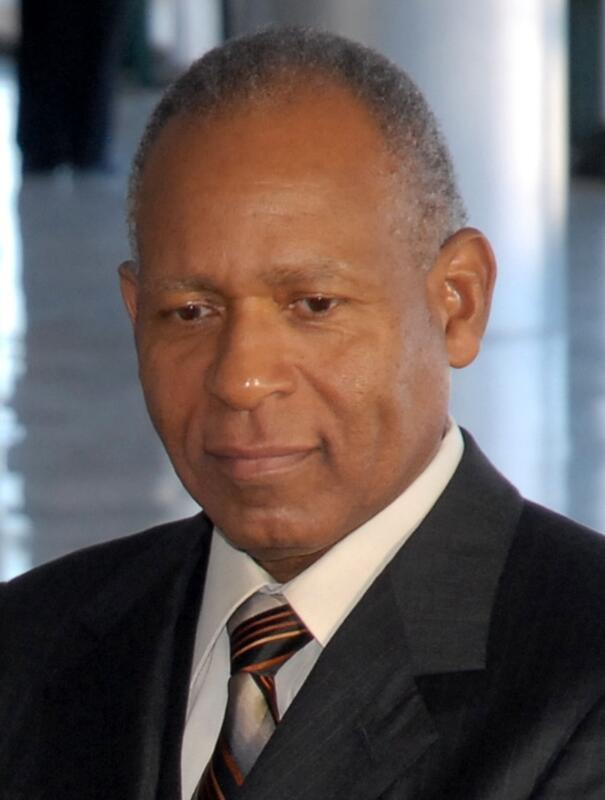

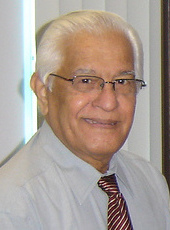
	First party	Second party
Leader	Patrick Manning	Basdeo Panday
Party	PNM	UNC
Last election	46.5%, 18 seats	49.9%, 18 seats
Seats won	20	16
Seat change	▲2	▼2
Popular vote	308,762	284,391
Percentage	50.9%	46.9%
Swing	▲4.4pp	▼3.0pp
Prime Minister before election
Patrick Manning
PNM
Subsequent Prime Minister
Patrick Manning
PNM

Early general elections were held in Trinidad and Tobago on 7 October 2002, after People's National Movement leader Patrick Manning had failed to secure a majority in the hung parliament produced by the 2001 elections. This time the PNM was able to secure a majority, winning 20 of the 36 seats. Voter turnout was 70%.

== Background ==
From 1995–2000, the two major political parties in Trinidad and Tobago, the United National Congress and the People's National Movement competed for political power. Both parties had the same number of representatives in Parliament, however a coalition formed between the UNC and the two-seat National Alliance for Reconstruction allowed the UNC majority status. The 2000 general elections further solidified the UNC's presence in government, as they won a majority of seats. In 2001, early general elections were triggered by a sudden defection of four Representatives from the UNC. In the subsequent elections both the UNC and the PNM won 18 seats in the House of Representatives. With a second lack of majority, both UNC leader Basdeo Panday and PNM leader Patrick Manning agreed to respect the decision of President A. N. R. Robinson, who both parties asked to select a new Prime Minister. Despite the UNC having received 49.9% of the vote to the PNM's 46.5%, Robinson, commending his "moral and spiritual values", selected Manning as Prime Minister. However, without a majority of House of Representative Seats, and faced with a hung parliament, Manning was forced to call for new elections the following year.

== Campaign ==
The lack of political stability in the Trinidad and Tobago government led to a tense election climate. Accusations of ballot box tampering were levied against PNM campaign managers and other political agents. In April 2002 reports indicated that Franklyn Khan, the Minister of Works and Transport and PNM party chairman, along with Eric Williams, the Minister of Energy and Energy Industries, received bribes from a local PNM councilman. Although the reports have not been validated, Khan resigned from his cabinet post in May of the following year.

However, the PNM was not the only political party to face controversy during the nine months between elections. With political control only guaranteed for a short while, the newly established PNM government quickly used political resources to sway the public and taint the reputation of the UNC. Under directives from Manning, several Commissions of Inquiry were established to investigate allegations of UNC corporate and political corruption, bribery, and voter padding. The main focus of PNM investigations was the development of the Piarco Airport. Manning tasked his Commissions to inquire after the nature of contract acquisition and development of the airport, as well as allegations of corruption and fraud by several high-ranking members of the UNC. While the investigations did lead to several instances of corruption and bribery, the Commissions better served the PNM by "severely tarnishing the image of the UNC".

Capitalizing on theatrical and public investigations into UNC misdeeds, and emphasizing a dynamic effort to increase transparency and end corruption, the PNM were able to frame themselves as the party "you can trust" and handily carried the October elections.

== Results ==
Party	Votes	%	Seats	+/–
People's National Movement	308,762	50.89	20	+2
United National Congress	284,391	46.87	16	–2
National Alliance for Reconstruction	6,776	1.12	0	0
Citizens' Alliance	5,983	0.99	0	New
Democratic Party of Trinidad and Tobago	662	0.11	0	New
Independents	193	0.03	0	New
Total	606,767	100.00	36	0
Valid votes	606,767	99.54		
Invalid/blank votes	2,804	0.46		
Total votes	609,571	100.00		
Registered voters/turnout	875,260	69.64		
Source: EBCTT, Nohlen

== Aftermath ==
The reaction of the government to the process of the 2002 election was irresolute. Historically, elections inflamed otherwise tranquil race relations within Trinidad and Tobago. Immediate reactions to the stymied election were disparate investigations of voter fraud across municipalities. Manning increased the number of parliamentary seats from 36 to 41 in order to prevent any future ties, and also appointed his wife as minister of Education.
