= Lincoln Douglas =

Trinidad and Tobago politician

Hayne Lincoln Douglas was a Member of Parliament in the House of Representatives in the Republic of Trinidad and Tobago. He entered Parliament in 2010 as the elected Member for Lopinot/Bon Air West, losing his seat in the 2015 elections.

He was Minister of State in the Ministry of the People and Social Development and then Minister in the Ministry of Arts and Multiculturalism.
