= 1986 Trinidad and Tobago general election =

General election in Trinidad and Tobago

- 15 December 1986

All 36 seats in the House of Representatives 19 seats needed for a majority
- Turnout: 65.5 (▲9.7 pp)
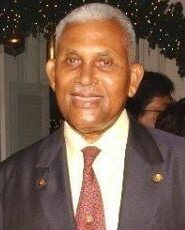

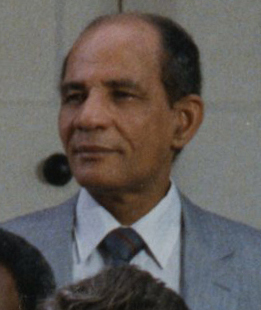
	First party	Second party
Leader	A. N. R. Robinson	George Chambers
Party	NAR	PNM
Leader since	1986	30 March 1981
Leader's seat	Tobago East	St. Ann's East (lost seat)
Last election	10 seats, 43.4%	26 seats, 32.0%
Seats won	33 / 36	3 / 36
Seat change	▲23	▼23
Popular vote	380,029	183,635
Percentage	66.3%	32.0%
Swing	▲22.9 pp	▼20.9 pp
Prime Minister before election
George Chambers
People's National Movement
Subsequent Prime Minister
A. N. R. Robinson
National Alliance for Reconstruction

General elections were held in Trinidad and Tobago on 15 December 1986. The result was a victory for the National Alliance for Reconstruction, which won 33 of the 36 seats. Voter turnout was 65.5%.

== Results ==
Party	Votes	%	Seats	+/–
National Alliance for Reconstruction	380,029	66.29	33	+23
People's National Movement	183,635	32.03	3	–23
National Joint Action Committee	8,592	1.50	0	0
People's Popular Movement	796	0.14	0	New
Independents	211	0.04	0	0
Total	573,263	100.00	36	0
Valid votes	573,263	99.30		
Invalid/blank votes	4,037	0.70		
Total votes	577,300	100.00		
Registered voters/turnout	882,029	65.45		
Source: EBCTT, Nohlen

=== Elected members ===
Constituency	NAR	PNM
Arima	Gloria Pollard	
Arouca North	Rawle Raphael	
Arouca South	Gloria Henry	
Barataria/San Juan	Kenneth Butcher	
Caroni East	Bhoe Tewarie	
Chaguanas	Winston Dookeran	
Couva North	Basdeo Panday	
Couva South	Kelvin Ramnath	
Diego Martin Central	Leo Des-Vignes	
Diego Martin East	Anthony Smart	
Diego Martin West	Margaret Hector	
Fyzabad	Arthur Sanderson	
La Brea	Albert Richards	
Laventille		Muriel Donawa-McDavidson
Naparima	Raymond Roy Palackdharry Singh	
Nariva	Brinsley Samaroo	
Oropouche	Trevor Sudama	
Ortoire/Mayaro	Selwyn Richardson	
Point Fortin	Selby Wilson	
Pointe-à-Pierre	Oswald Hemlee	
Port-of-Spain East		Morris Marshall
Port-of-Spain West	Jenson Christopher Fox	
Port-of-Spain South	Theodore Guerra	
Princes Town	Jennifer Johnson	
San Fernando East		Patrick Manning
San Fernando West	Anselm St. George	
Siparia	Govindra Roopnarine	
St Ann's East	Lincoln Myers	
St Ann's West	Eden Shand	
St Augustine	John Humphery	
St Joseph	Carson Charles	
Tabaquite	Nizam Mohammed	
Tobago East	Arthur N.R. Robinson	
Tobago West	Pamela Nicholson	
Toco/Manzanilla	Joseph Toney	
Tunapuna	Emanuel Hosein	
