= 2001 Trinidad and Tobago general election =

General election in Trinidad and Tobago

- 10 December 2001

All 36 seats in the House of Representatives 19 seats needed for a majority
- Turnout: 66.13% (▲3.08 pp)
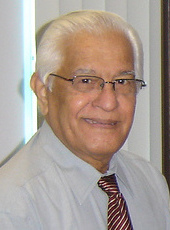

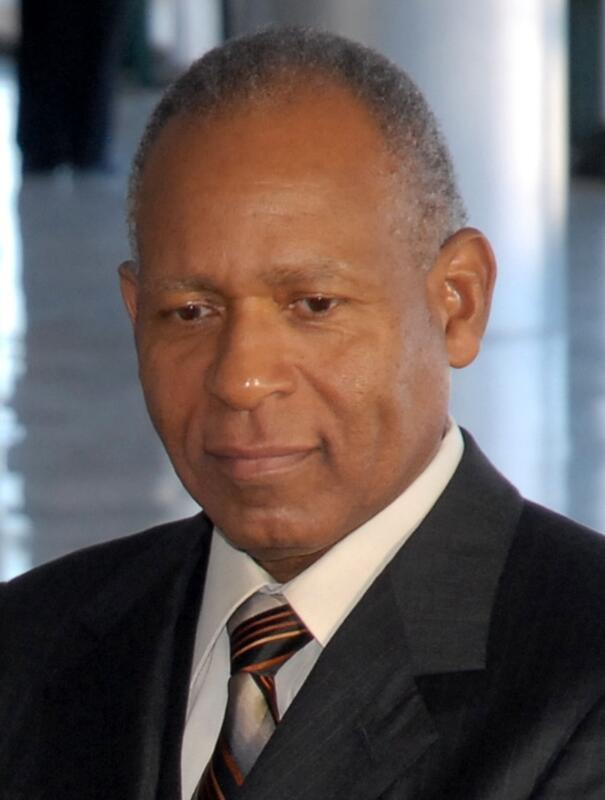
	First party	Second party
Leader	Basdeo Panday	Patrick Manning
Party	UNC	PNM
Leader since	30 April 1989	19 December 1986
Leader's seat	Couva North	San Fernando East
Last election	19 seats, 51.7%	16 seats, 46.5%
Seats won	18	18
Seat change	▼1	▲2
Popular vote	279,002	260,075
Percentage	49.9%	46.5%
Swing	▼1.8 pp	0 pp
Prime Minister before election
Basdeo Panday
United National Congress
Subsequent Prime Minister
Patrick Manning
People's National Movement

Early general elections were held in Trinidad and Tobago on 10 December 2001, after the ruling United National Congress lost its majority in the House of Representatives following four defections. However, the election results saw the UNC and the People's National Movement both win 18 seats. Although the UNC received the most votes, President A. N. R. Robinson nominated PNM leader Patrick Manning as Prime Minister. Voter turnout was 66.1%.

== Results ==
Party	Votes	%	Seats	+/–
United National Congress	279,002	49.90	18	–1
People's National Movement	260,075	46.51	18	+2
National Team Unity	14,207	2.54	0	New
National Alliance for Reconstruction	5,841	1.04	0	–1
National Democratic Organisation	50	0.01	0	New
Total	559,175	100.00	36	0
Valid votes	559,175	99.50		
Invalid/blank votes	2,818	0.50		
Total votes	561,993	100.00		
Registered voters/turnout	849,874	66.13		
Source: EBCTT, Nohlen
