= 1961 Trinidad and Tobago general election =

General election in Trinidad and Tobago

- 4 December 1961

All 30 seats in the Legislative Council 16 seats needed for a majority
- Turnout: 88.1 (▲8.0 pp)
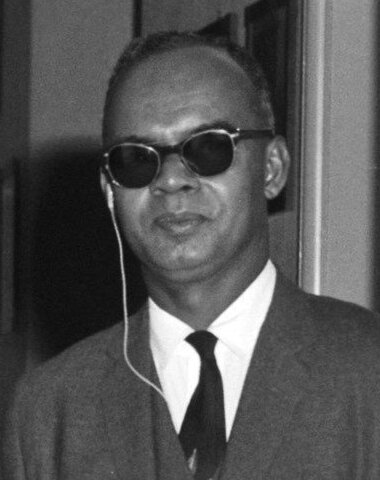

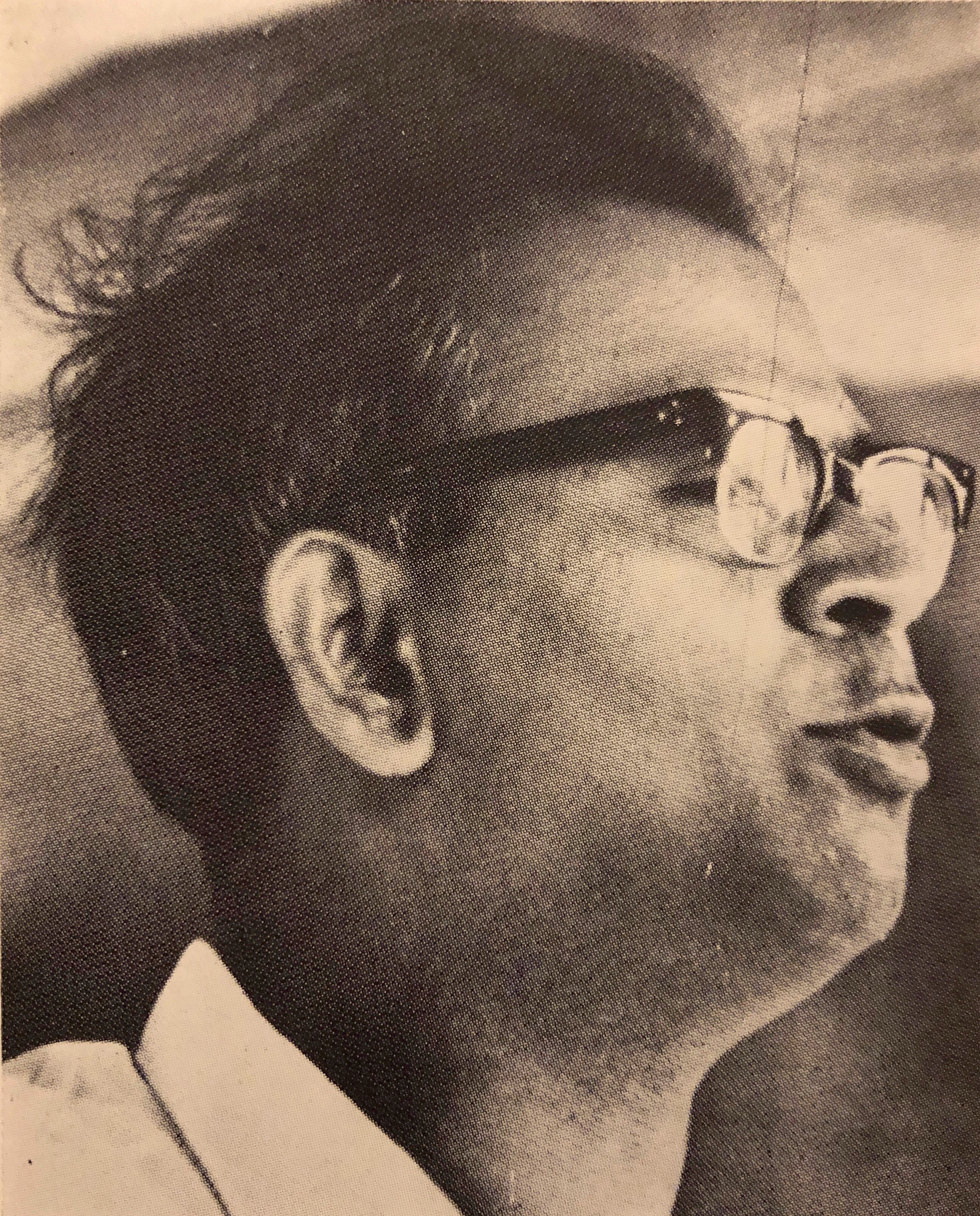
	First party	Second party
Leader	Eric Williams	Rudranath Capildeo
Party	PNM	DLP
Leader since	15 January 1956	1960
Leader's seat	Port of Spain South	Saint Augustine
Last election	13 seats, 39.8%	–
Seats won	20 / 30	10 / 30
Seat change	▲7	New party
Popular vote	190,003	138,190
Percentage	57.0%	41.7%
Swing	▲17.2 pp	New party
Premier before election
Eric Williams
People's National Movement
Subsequent Premier and later Prime Minister
Eric Williams
People's National Movement

General elections were held in Trinidad and Tobago on 4 December 1961. The result was a victory for the People's National Movement, which won 20 of the 30 seats. Voter turnout was 88.1%.

== Results ==
Party	Votes	%	Seats	+/–
People's National Movement	190,003	57.00	20	+7
Democratic Labour Party	138,910	41.67	10	+3
African National Congress	1,634	0.49	0	New
Butler Party	1,314	0.39	0	–2
Independents	1,502	0.45	0	–2
Total	333,363	100.00	30	+6
Valid votes	333,363	99.96		
Invalid/blank votes	149	0.04		
Total votes	333,512	100.00		
Registered voters/turnout	378,511	88.11		
Source: EBCTT
