= 1991 Trinidad and Tobago general election =

- 16 December 1991

All 36 seats in the House of Representatives 19 seats needed for a majority
- Turnout: 65.46% (▲0.01pp)
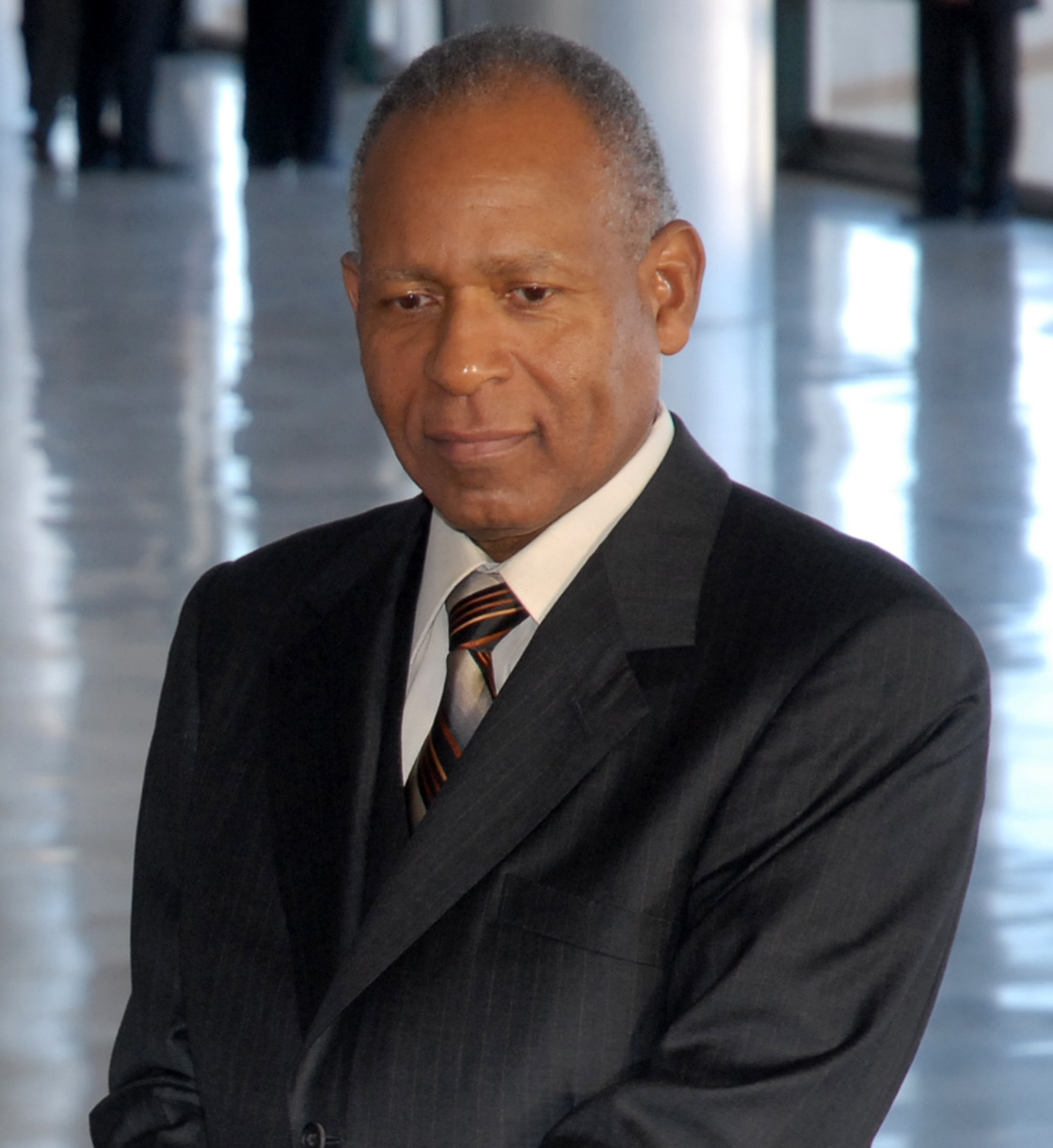

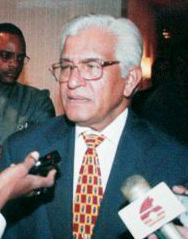

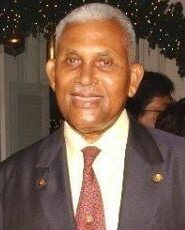
	First party	Second party	Third party
Leader	Patrick Manning	Basdeo Panday	A. N. R. Robinson
Party	PNM	UNC	NAR
Last election	32.03%, 3 seats	–	66.29%, 33 seats
Seats won	21	13	2
Seat change	▲18	New	▼31
Popular vote	233,150	151,046	127,335
Percentage	45.07%	29.20%	24.62%
Swing	▲13.04pp	New	▼41.67pp
Prime Minister before election
A. N. R. Robinson
National Alliance for Reconstruction
Subsequent Prime Minister
Patrick Manning
People's National Movement

General elections were held in Trinidad and Tobago on 16 December 1991. The result was a victory for the People's National Movement, which won 21 of the 36 seats. Voter turnout was 65.5%.

== Results ==
Party	Votes	%	Seats	+/–
People's National Movement	233,150	45.07	21	+18
United National Congress	151,046	29.20	13	New
National Alliance for Reconstruction	127,335	24.62	2	–31
National Joint Action Committee	5,743	1.11	0	0
Total	517,274	100.00	36	0
Valid votes	517,274	99.47		
Invalid/blank votes	2,775	0.53		
Total votes	520,049	100.00		
Registered voters/turnout	794,486	65.46		
Source: EBCTT, Nohlen
