= 1966 Trinidad and Tobago general election =

General election in Trinidad and Tobago

- 7 November 1966

All 36 seats in the House of Representatives 19 seats needed for a majority
- Turnout: 65.8 (▼22.3 pp)
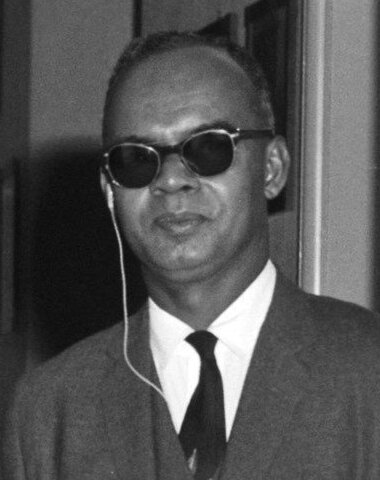

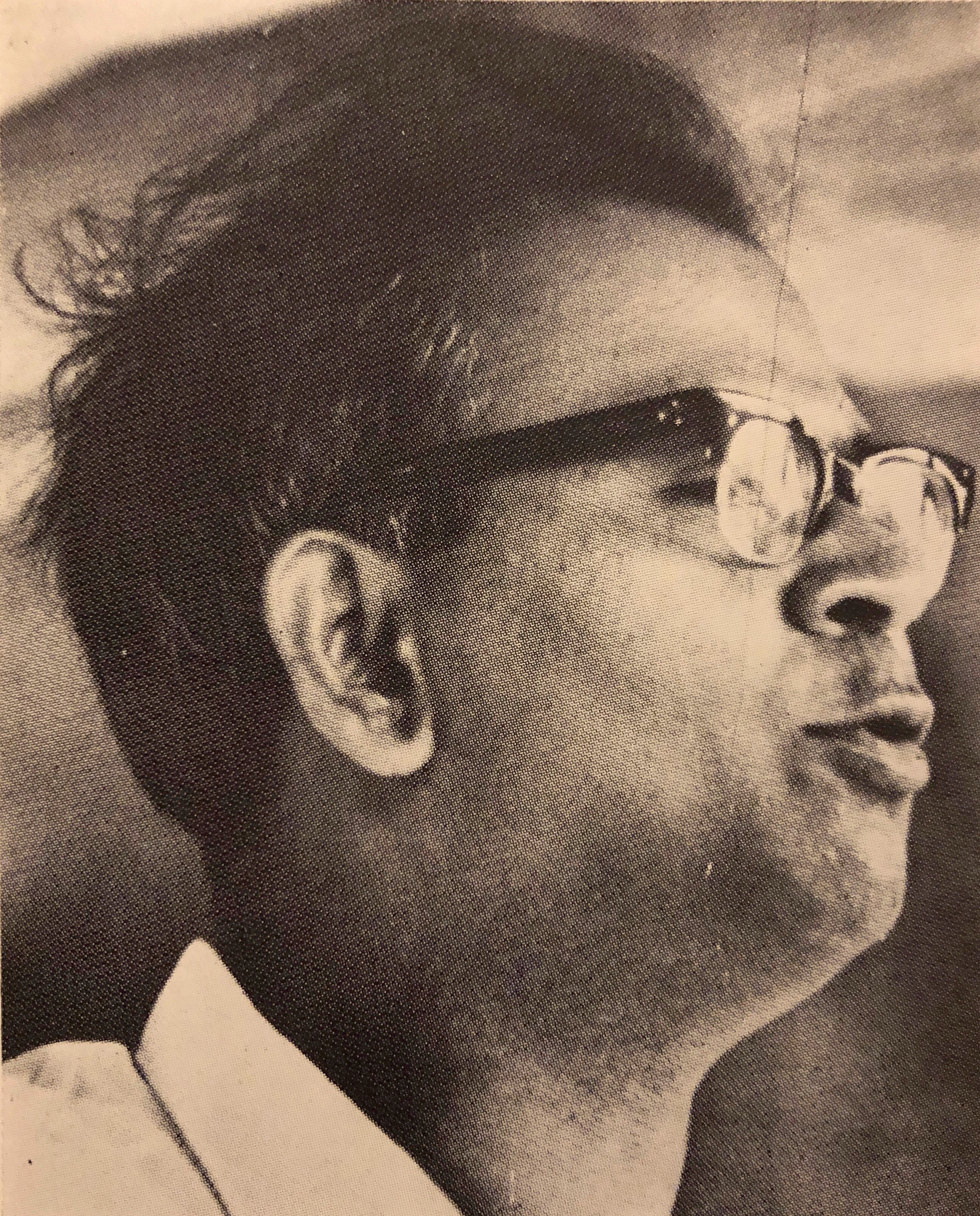
	First party	Second party
Leader	Eric Williams	Rudranath Capildeo
Party	PNM	DLP
Leader since	15 January 1961	31 August 1962
Leader's seat	Port of Spain South	Saint Augustine
Last election	20 seats, 57.0%	10 seats, 41.7%
Seats won	24 / 36	12 / 36
Seat change	▲4	▲2
Popular vote	158,573	102,792
Percentage	52.4%	34.0%
Swing	▼4.6 pp	▼7.7 pp
Prime Minister before election
Eric Williams
PNM
Subsequent Prime Minister
Eric Williams
PNM

General elections were held in Trinidad and Tobago on 7 November 1966. The result was a victory for the People's National Movement, which won 24 of the 36 seats. Voter turnout was 65.8%.

== Results ==
Party	Votes	%	Seats	+/–
People's National Movement	158,573	52.44	24	+4
Democratic Labour Party	102,792	33.99	12	+2
Liberal Party	26,870	8.89	0	New
Workers and Farmers Party	10,484	3.47	0	New
People's Democratic Party	943	0.31	0	New
Butler Party	704	0.23	0	0
Seukeran Independent Party	569	0.19	0	New
Independents	1,467	0.49	0	0
Total	302,402	100.00	36	+6
Valid votes	302,402	99.95		
Invalid/blank votes	146	0.05		
Total votes	302,548	100.00		
Registered voters/turnout	459,839	65.79		
Source: Nohlen
