= 1971 Trinidad and Tobago general election =

- 24 May 1971

All 36 seats in the House of Representatives 19 seats needed for a majority
- Turnout: 33.2 (▼46.9pp)
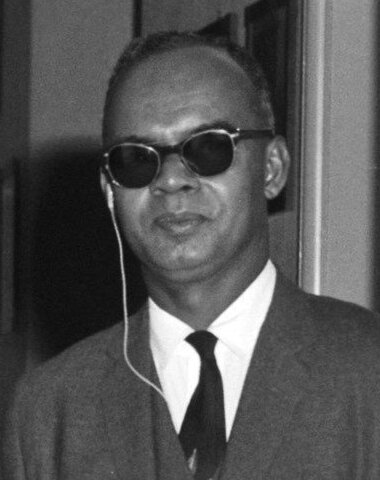
	First party
Leader	Eric Williams
Party	PNM
Last election	52.4%, 24 seats,
Seats won	36
Seat change	▲12
Popular vote	99,723
Percentage	84.1%
Swing	▲31.7pp
Prime Minister before election
Eric Williams
PNM
Subsequent Prime Minister
Eric Williams
PNM

General elections were held in Trinidad and Tobago on 24 May 1971. The result was a victory for the People's National Movement, which won all 36 seats. Due to a boycott by all major opposition parties protesting at fraud related to the voting machines used in previous elections, voter turnout was just 33%.

== Results ==
Party	Votes	%	Seats	+/–
People's National Movement	99,723	84.14	36	+12
Democratic Liberation Party	14,940	12.61	0	New
African National Congress	2,864	2.42	0	New
Independents	997	0.84	0	0
Total	118,524	100.00	36	0
Valid votes	118,524	99.94		
Invalid/blank votes	73	0.06		
Total votes	118,597	100.00		
Registered voters/turnout	357,568	33.17		
Source: EBCTT, Caribbean Elections
