= A. N. R. Robinson =

President of Trinidad and Tobago from 1997 to 2003

His Excellency The Honourable Chief A. N. R. Robinson SC OCC TC
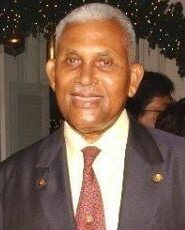

3rd President of Trinidad and Tobago
- In office 18 March 1997 – 16 March 2003
- Prime Minister: Basdeo Panday; Patrick Manning
- Preceded by: Noor Hassanali
- Succeeded by: George Maxwell Richards

3rd Prime Minister of Trinidad and Tobago
- In office 18 December 1986 – 17 December 1991
- President: Ellis Clarke; Noor Hassanali
- Preceded by: George Chambers
- Succeeded by: Patrick Manning

Personal details
- Born: Arthur Napoleon Raymond Robinson; 16 December 1926 Scarborough, Trinidad and Tobago
- Died: 9 April 2014 (aged 87) Port of Spain, Trinidad and Tobago
- Party: People's National Movement (until 1970); Democratic Action Congress (1970–1986); National Alliance for Reconstruction (1986–1997)
- Spouse: Patricia Robinson
- Education: University of London; Oxford University

Arthur Napoleon Raymond Robinson SC OCC TC (16 December 1926 – 9 April 2014; known as A. N. R. or "Ray" Robinson), was a Trinidad and Tobago politician who served as the third President of Trinidad and Tobago from 1997 to 2003 and the third Prime Minister from 1986 to 1991. He is known for his resilience within the government, resigning from Eric Williams’ administration in 1970 promoted by the State of Emergency imposed on Black Power protests, and is recognized for his proposal that led to the establishment of the International Criminal Court. He is also remembered for being held hostage during the 1990 Jamaat al Muslimeen coup attempt, during which he ordered the army to “attack with full force” while being held at gunpoint.

Robinson was the first active politician to be elected to the presidency, and was the first presidential candidate who was not elected unopposed. President Robinson sparked controversy in his term in office when he refused to appoint certain senators recommended by Prime Minister Basdeo Panday following the elections in 2000 and in 2001 when he appointed the Leader of the Opposition Patrick Manning to the position of prime minister after a tied election.

== Early life ==
Robinson was born in Tobago in 1926 to Tobagonians James and Isabella Robinson. He was educated at Castara Methodist School (where his father served as head master) and Bishop's High School, where he obtained a Higher School Certificate with distinction in Latin and competed for an Island Scholarship. He obtained a Bachelor of Laws degree from London University as an external student. In 1951 he left for the United Kingdom, where he was called to the bar at Inner Temple and obtained a degree in philosophy, politics and economics from St. John's College, Oxford. Robinson returned to Trinidad and Tobago, where he practised as a Barrister-at-Law.

Robinson married Patricia Rawlins and had two children, David and Ann-Margaret.

== Political life ==
Robinson was a founding member of the People's National Movement and served in the parliament of the West Indies Federation between 1958 and 1960. In 1961 he was elected to the Parliament of Trinidad and Tobago, serving as member of parliament for Tobago. He was the country's Minister of Finance from 1961 to 1966. Following the Black Power Revolution in 1970, Robinson resigned from the People's National Movement and formed the Action Committee of Dedicated Citizens, which joined forced with the Democratic Labour Party to contest the 1971 General Elections; Robinson and the DLP ended up boycotting the elections in protest over the use of voting machines.

After the 1971 election, the Action Committee of Dedicated Citizens became the Democratic Action Congress which won both Tobago seats in the 1976 General Elections. As leader as the DAC, Robinson worked for internal self-government for Tobago, culminating in the passage of the Tobago House of Assembly Act in 1980. Robinson resigned from Parliament to contest the Tobago House of Assembly elections, and became the Chairman of the Assembly following victory by the DLP. He had also proposed the idea of the International Court.

In 1981 Robinson allied with the United Labour Front under the leadership of Basdeo Panday, and the Tapia House Movement, under the leadership of Lloyd Best, to form the National Alliance for Reconstruction. It entered into an alliance with the Organisation for National Reconstruction, under the leadership of Karl Hudson-Phillips, to successfully fight the 1983 Trinidad and Tobago local elections. Building on this victory the four parties combined to form the National Alliance for Reconstruction.

ANR Robinson went on to become prime minister through the National Alliance For Reconstruction. Shortly after assuming the position, he dismissed Basdeo Panday, Kelvin Ramnath, Trevor Sudama and John Humphrey from the Cabinet. However, Robinson subsequently lost the 1991 elections. He rejoined the UNC Administration as a coalition member representing the NAR. Panday later offered to nominate him to become the next President of Trinidad and Tobago.

Robinson was instrumental in the creation of the International Criminal Court. In 1989, he asked Benjamin Ferencz and Robert Kurt Woetzel to assist in drafting a proposal for the UN General Assembly to ask the UN's International Law Commission to study the possibility of creating the International Criminal Court. The resolution was presented on behalf of Trinidad and Tobago at the UN General Assembly in June 1989, leading to the adoption of the Rome Statute of the International Criminal Court in July 1998 and creation of the International Criminal Court on 1 July 2002.

=== Jamaat al Muslimeen coup attempt ===
During the 1990 coup d'état attempt by the Jamaat al Muslimeen, Robinson and much of his cabinet were held hostage for six days by gunmen under the leadership of Yasin Abu Bakr. When instructed to order the army to stop firing on the Red House, where they were held hostage, Robinson instead instructed them to "attack with full force," an action which led to him getting beaten by his captors. He was also shot in his leg.

== Illness and death ==
Robinson suffered from a number of ailments including a stroke and prostate complications and was hospitalised at St. Clair Medical Hospital after he complained of feeling ill. Following an illness of several months, he died at St. Clair Medical Centre at about 6:00 am on 9 April 2014. In reaction, Prime Minister Kamla Persad-Bissessar said that he was "one of our nation's outstanding sons...but the legacy he leaves behind shall surely live on to inspire today's and tomorrow's generations."

== Honours ==
In 1997 Robinson was awarded the Trinity Cross, at that time the highest order of Trinidad and Tobago.

During the investiture of President Thomas Boni Yayi of Benin as a titled Yoruba chieftain on 20 December 2008, the reigning Ooni of Ile-Ife, Nigeria, Olubuse II, referred to President Robinson and his wife as previous recipients of the same royal honour.

In May 2011, the airport in Tobago was renamed the A. N. R. Robinson International Airport, replacing the name "Crown Point International Airport".

In November 2011, A. N. R. Robinson was the recipient of Tobago's highest award, the Tobago Medal of Honour.

Political offices
Preceded by Noor Hassanali	President of Trinidad and Tobago; 1997–2003	Succeeded by George Maxwell Richards
Preceded by George Chambers	Prime Minister of Trinidad and Tobago; 1986–1991	Succeeded by Patrick Manning
