= United Labour Front =

- Abbreviation: ULF
- Leader: Basdeo Panday
- Founded: 1975
- Dissolved: 1986
- Preceded by: DLP; WFP
- Merged into: NAR
- Ideology: Democratic socialism Labourism; Trade unionism

The United Labour Front (ULF) was a labourist political party in Trinidad and Tobago and the main opposition party between 1976 and 1986. It was a successor to the Democratic Labour Party and the Workers and Farmers Party.

== History ==
The party was established in 1975 by union leaders in an attempt to unify the mainly black workers in the oil industry with the mainly Indian workers in the sugar plantations. However, this was not achieved successfully, and the party was labelled communist by opponents, alienating key potential voters. Despite this setback, the party received 27.2% of the vote in the 1976 elections, winning ten of the 36 seats and becoming the main opposition to the People's National Movement. It saw most of its success amongst Indian voters, and despite its intentions to become a multi-racial party, effectively became the successor to the Democratic Labour Party. Having started with a collective leadership, the party eventually coalesced around Basdeo Panday.

In the 1981 elections the party joined with the Democratic Action Congress and the Tapia House Movement to form the Trinidad and Tobago National Alliance. However, its vote share fell to 15.2%, falling behind the Organisation for National Reconstruction, and losing two of its ten seats (the DAC won two and the Tapia House Movement none). Prior to the 1986 elections it merged into the newly established National Alliance for Reconstruction, which won the elections.
