= National Alliance for Reconstruction =

- Abbreviation: NAR
- Leader: A. N. R. Robinson (1986–91, 1995–97); Carson Charles (1992–93, 2005–); Serby Wilson (1993–94); Nizam Mohammed (1997–99); Anthony Smart (1999–01); Lennox Sankersingh (2001–05)
- Founded: 1986
- Dissolved: 2005 (de facto)
- Merger of: Organisation for National Reconstruction; United Labour Front; Democratic Action Congress; Tapia House Movement; Some former People's National Movement members
- Succeeded by: CLUB '88; United National Congress
- Ideology: Social liberalism Social democracy

The National Alliance for Reconstruction (NAR) was the governing party in Trinidad and Tobago between 1986 and 1991. The party has been inactive since 2005.

== History ==
The party was established in 1986, aiming to be a multi-racial party. It was formed by former People's National Movement members and opposition parties, including the Organisation for National Reconstruction (a party established in by PNM dissident Karl Hudson-Phillips in 1980), the United Labour Front, the Democratic Action Congress and the Tapia House Movement – the latter three having previously been part of an electoral pact known as the National Alliance.

The new party won the 1986 elections, taking around 66% of the national vote (the first time the PNM had failed to win over 50% since 1956) and winning 33 of the 36 seats in the Trinidad and Tobago. A. N. R. Robinson, previously leader of the DAC, became prime minister.

The NAR entered government with broad national support and goodwill, but support declined as fiscal austerity and neo-liberal economic policies imposed by the International Monetary Fund's Structural Adjustment Program resulted in increased unemployment and a 10% cut in salaries in the public service. Infighting over government posts and economic policies split the party and some ministers defected after a single year in power. In 1988 former ULF leader Basdeo Panday was expelled, taking with him five other former ULF members to form the United National Congress. Subsequently, a further five MPs defected to become independents.

In 1990 the Jamaat al Muslimeen attempted to capitalise on the dissatisfaction with an attempted coup. Despite surviving the attempted coup the NAR was defeated in the 1991 general elections, winning only two seats, both in Tobago. Following the defeat Robinson resigned as party leader, and several other prominent NAR members retired, leaving the NAR severely weakened. In the 1992 local elections the NAR suffered another humiliating defeat, failing to win a single seat. The NAR did however retain its dominance in the Tobago House of Assembly, winning eleven of the twelve seats in the 1992 elections.

The party went through rapid leadership changes. Former Works Minister Carson Charles served as leader from 1992 until 1993. He was replaced by former Finance Minister Selby Wilson. Charles left the NAR and formed his own group the National Development Party. In a 1994 by-election an attempt was made to have the NAR and its two daughter parties the UNC and NDP, run a joint platform. However, the proposals failed to come to fruition. The UNC was adopting a policy of attracting 'NAR voters' directly rather than attempting another formal alliance, and following his failure to reunite the party, Wilson resigned and the NAR was leaderless until just prior to the 1995 elections. During this period NAR chairman Robert Mayers served as the de facto leader. When elections were called in 1995, Robinson was persuaded to return and resume leadership of the party.

In the elections the party retained its two Tobago seats, but failed to win any in Trinidad. However, it joined the UNC-led coalition and returned to government. Robinson was appointed Minister Extraordinaire and was elected president in 1997. Former Speaker of the House Nizam Mohammed replaced him as NAR leader.

However the NAR continued to weaken and fracture. Its bargaining position was reduced when two PNM (People's National Movement) MPs defected and joined the government as independents. In the 1996 Tobago elections an NAR assemblywoman, Deborah Moore-Miggins, contested as an independent and won, although the party won ten of the twelve seats. However, two other NAR assemblymen later defected and joined her in forming the People's Empowerment Party.

During the 1996 local elections the NAR contested around a third of the 124 seats, whilst the UNC contested the remaining two-thirds. Most of the seats contested by the NAR however were PNM strongholds, where the NAR had little support. Even in places like Arima where the NAR could potentially have won, independent candidates split the vote, leading to PNM victories. The NAR won no seats and accused the UNC of supporting the independents, deliberately preventing the NAR from regaining representation in Trinidad.

Further problems for the party from its two MPs. Morgan Job (who had taken over Robinson's seat) frequently sided with the UNC against the NAR leadership, whilst the other was increasing friendly with the PEP and eventually became an independent. The party subsequently withdrew from the government. Mohammed did not seek reelection and former Attorney General Anthony Smart became the new NAR leader in 1999. In the 2000 elections the party was reduced to a single seat.

The following year the party lost the Tobago House of Assembly elections, defeated by the PNM. Early national elections were also held in 2001, which saw the NAR lose its single seat. In another early election the following year the party increased its vote share to 1.1%, but failed to regain a seat.

The NAR suffered a further blow in 2004 when a portion of the Tobago wing of the party led by Hochoy Charles split away from the NAR and re-formed the DAC, reducing the NAR to two seats. In the 2005 Tobago elections it received just 113 votes and lost both.

== Party leaders ==
- A. N. R. Robinson (1986–91, 1995–97)
- Carson Charles (1992–93), (2005- )
- Selby Wilson (1993–94)
- Nizam Mohammed (1997–99)
- Anthony Smart (1999-2001)
- Lennox Sankersingh (2001-2005)
