= 2020 United National Congress leadership election =

United National Congress leadership election

- 6 December 2020
- Turnout: 17,066
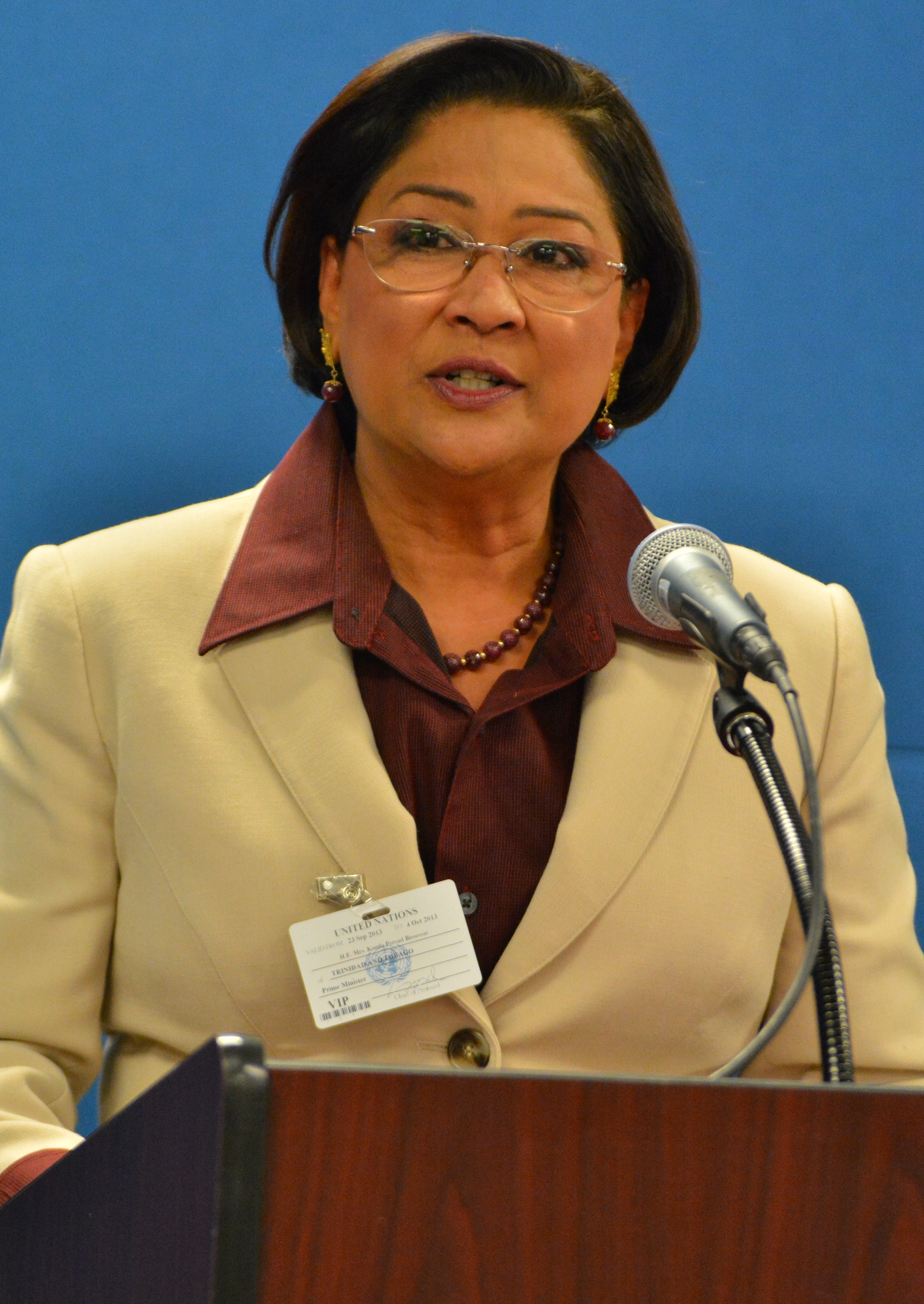

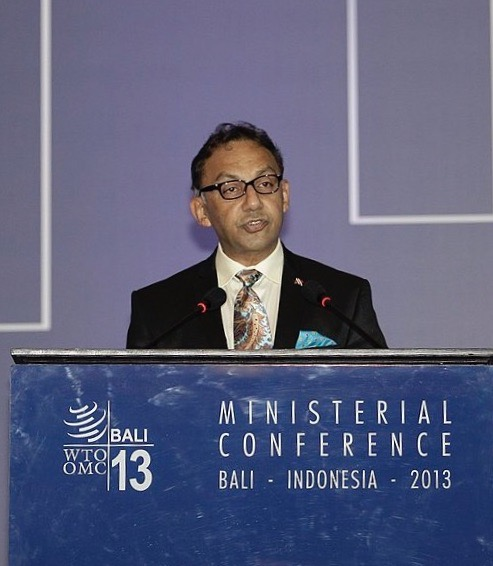

Candidate	Kamla Persad-Bissessar	Vasant Bharath
Popular vote	14,873 votes ▼5,455 votes	2,193 votes ▲2,193 votes
Percentage	87.15% ▼12.07 pp	12.85% ▲12.85 pp
Last election	20,328 votes, 99.22% (2017); 17,502 votes, 84.85% (2015)	Dropped out; 0 votes, 0% (2017); 1,305 votes, 6.33% (2015)
Home Constituency	Siparia	Saint Augustine
Team	Star	Lotus
Symbol
Previous Leader
Kamla Persad-Bissessar
Leader
Kamla Persad-Bissessar

The 2020 United National Congress leadership election was held on Sunday, 6 December 2020, after Opposition Leader Kamla Persad-Bissessar, the current leader of the UNC, faced losses commencing in January 2013 with the wipeout of her People's Partnership-led administration from the Tobago House of Assembly at the 2013 election, loss in the 2015 Trinidad and Tobago general election and loss in the 2020 Trinidad and Tobago general election. The candidates for political leader were incumbent Kamla Persad-Bissessar on Team Star against former member of parliament for St. Augustine and former Minister of Trade, Industry and Investment in the People's Partnership's government, Vasant Bharath, on Team Lotus. Former senator and Minister of Transport in the People's Partnership's government, Devant Maharaj, was an early candidate for political leader, but was never formally nominated as he dropped out on nomination day on the 15th of November 2020, citing irregularities in the voting process. He endorsed Vasant Bharath and Team Lotus. Kamla Persad-Bissessar won with of 87.15% of the votes, while Vasant Bharath got 12.85% of the votes.

== Background ==
Focus on the leadership election occurred when Anita Haynes, Public Relations Officer of the United National Congress, was questioned by reporters on whether or not the Opposition Leader Kamla Persad-Bissessar would resign. Devant Maharaj was a leading figure in calling for Kamla Persad-Bissessar to step down as political leader. He actively called for her to step down on social media and on billboards he had put up. On the 27th of October 2020, Kamla Persad-Bissessar announced the date for the primary election to be held on Sunday the 6th of December 2020.

== Results ==
Kamla Persad-Bissessar won with a sweeping victory of 87.15% of the votes, while Vasant Bharath got 12.85% of the votes. On election night, Persad-Bissessar said her Team Star was on the path to defeat Bharath's Team Lotus. She called for unity within the party and said their main political opponent was the People's National Movement. She claimed under her continued leadership that she would work to make the party more united and stronger. She also acknowledged that there was some reports of elections issues, but that overall everything had gone well. Persad-Bissessar said that the low voter turnout was due to the COVID-19 pandemic, as it was in the general election. Bharath conceded shortly after midnight and congratulated Persad-Bissessar and wished her success. He also stated the party needs to determine the reason for the low voter turnout then they need to "inspire their ground troops" to win the next general election. Bharath stated that he was willing to work with Persad-Bissessar to help rebuild the party. However, he mentioned that there were irregularities in the election which he had warned about and many were unable to vote. He said that active campaigner on Persad-Bissessar's team were presiding officers, his team was not granted access to a revised list of electors, that there were reports of voters being verbally abused and intimidated, there was paraphernalia of the Star Team being distributed at some precincts, and that his father John Bharath, a founding member of the UNC, was not on the voting list and that there were other people who were not on the revised voter list who were allowed to vote. Devant Maharaj, who dropped out of the election before nomination day and supported Bharath, called on Persad-Bissessar to embrace all and rebuild the party. The election had the lowest voter turnout for an UNC leadership election with 17,066 members out of 120,000+ members coming out to vote. This follows after the last leadership election in 2017 was recorded to have the lowest voter turnout.

Founder of the party, Basdeo Panday, commented before the election that the UNC had no future under the leadership of Kamla Persad-Bissessar nor Vassant Bharath and would eventually die out. He reiterated again after the election results that the UNC would die, pointing that it had the lowest voter turn out for an UNC leadership election and says that the COVID-19 pandemic had nothing to do with it as the last leadership election was the same. He further said that Kamla Persad-Bissessar killed the party "beyond repair" and that the only way to end the "tribal politics" was for a new party to be formed. However, political analyst Mukesh Basdeo disagreed with Panday, saying that the party still got a significant number of votes despite the COVID-19 pandemic and that, had the election been held in other conditions, it would have shown a decline in the interest of the party. He also stated that the pandemic deterred people from coming out to vote. He noted that smaller third parties were crushed in the 2020 general election and that most of the votes went to the two major parties, the UNC and the PNM.

== Candidates ==
Roles in bold are currently held.

Political leader
Candidate	Last political roles	Announced	Endorsements	Conceded/Dropped out
**Kamla Persad-Bissessar**	**Incumbent Political Leader** (since 2010); **Opposition Leader of Trinidad and Tobago** (since 2015); Prime Minister of Trinidad and Tobago (2010-2015)	22 September 2020	MPs: Roodal Moonilal, Vandana Mohit, Barry Padarath, Rishad Seecheran, David Lee, Anita Haynes, Dinesh Rambally, Saddam Hosein, Ravi Ratiram, Rudranath Indarsingh, Rai Ragbir, Lackram Bodoe, Khadiijah Ameen, Davendranath Tancoo, Rodney Charles Michelle Benjamin Senators: David Nakhid, Anil Roberts Jearlean John, Jayanti Lutchmedial, Damian Lyder, Wade Mark; Former Senator: Sean S.M. Sobers; Constituency Executives: Siparia Constituency Executive, Princes Town Constituency Executive, Couva North Constituency Executive	N/A (won the election)
**Vasant Bharath**	Member of Parliament for St. Augustine (2007-2010) Former Minister of Trade, Industry, Investment (2012-2015)	27 October 2020	Former MPs: Jack Warner, Carlos John, Nela Khan, Nizam Baksh, Christine Newallo-Hosein; Former Senators/Ministers: Devant Maharaj, Jennifer Jones-Kernahan, Mervyn Assam, Adesh Nanan	7 December 2020
**Devant Maharaj**	Former Senator and Minister of Transport	15 October 2020	N/A	15 November 2020 (nomination day); Never formally nominated and endorsed Vasant Bharath

Deputy political leaders
Team	Candidates
Star	Jearlean John, Lackram Bodoe, David Lee
Lotus	Ramona Ramdial, Stephen Ramroop, Joseph A. Pires
N/A	Robert R. Amar

Chairman
Team	Candidate
Star	Davendranath Tancoo
Lotus	Larry Lalla

Vice Chairman
Team	Candidate
Star	Khadijah Ameen
Lotus	Hershael K. Ramesar

Treasurer
Team	Candidate
Star	William Archie
Lotus	Winston Siriram

Party organizer
Team	Candidate
Star	Ravi Ratiram
Lotus	Prakash Williams

Election officer
Team	Candidate
Star	Don T. Sylvester
Lotus	Kamini Ramraj

Policy and strategy officer
Team	Candidate
Star	Sean S.M. Sobers
Lotus	Chunilal Bedassie

Research officer
Team	Candidate
Star	Monifa L. Russell-Andrews
Lotus	Nazima Ali Knox

International relations officer
Team	Candidate
Star	Wilfred Nicholas Morris
Lotus	Joey Harrynan
N/A	Rishi Kanick

Education officer
Team	Candidate
Star	Clifton De Coteau
Lotus	Ramchand Rampersad
N/A	Vera Dookie-Ramlal

Northeast regional representative
Team	Candidate
Star	Colin Neil Gosine
Lotus	Candice Mohan

Northwest regional representative
Team	Candidate
Star	Eli Zakour
Lotus	Jason Peru

Central regional representative
Team	Candidate
Star	Imam Rasheed Karim
Lotus	Andrew A.M. Mungal

South regional representative
Team	Candidate
Star	Shanty Boodram
Lotus	Anil Ramjit

Tobago regional representative
Team	Candidate
Star	Bheemal Ramlogan. The young man from Tobago West who previously received over 16,000 votes once again retained his position. https://trinidadexpress.com/news/local/unc-final-internal-election-results/article_17ef781d-ebf3-51a0-b474-9987989221c6.html
Lotus	Junior Barrington "Skippy" Thomas

== See also ==
- 2013 Trinidadian local elections
- 2015 Trinidad and Tobago general election
- 2017 Tobago House of Assembly election
- 2020 Trinidad and Tobago general election
- 2022 People's National Movement leadership election
