= People's Partnership administration =

The government of Trinidad and Tobago was in the hands of a coalition called the People's Partnership, led by Kamla Persad-Bissessar, between May 2010 and September 2015.

== Initial Cabinet ==
Party key	UNC
Party key	COP
Party key	TOP

Cabinet of Trinidad and Tobago
Portfolio	Minister
Prime Minister	Kamla Persad-Bissessar
Attorney-General	Anand Ramlogan
Minister of Foreign Affairs	Dr. Surujrattan Rambachan
Minister of Finance	Winston Dookeran
Minister of National Security	John Sandy
Minister of Trade and Industry	Stephen Cadiz
Minister of Local Government	Dr Chandresh Sharma
Minister of Education	Dr Tim Gopeesingh
Minister of Works and Transport	Jack Warner
Minister of Health	Therese Baptiste-Cornelis
Minister of Food Production, Land and Marine Affairs	Vasant Bharath
Minister of Public Administration	Rudrawatee Ramgoolam
Minister of Justice	Herbert Volney
Minister of Tourism	Dr. Rupert Griffith
Minister of Community Development	Nizam Baksh
Minister of the Arts and Culture	Winston Peters
Minister of Housing and the Environment	Dr. Roodal Moonilal
Minister of Planning and Gender Affairs	Mary King
Minister of Energy and Energy Industries	Carolyn Seepersad-Bachan
Minister of Labour	Errol MacLeod
Minister of the People and Social Development	Glen Ramadhardsingh
Minister of Public Utilities	Emmanuel George
Minister of Legal Affairs	Prakash Ramadhar
Minister of Science, Technology and Tertiary Education	Fazal Karim
Minister of Sports and Youth Affairs	Anil Roberts
Minister of Tobago Development	Vernella Alleyne-Toppin

== May 11, 2011- June 22, 2012 ==
Party key	UNC
Party key	COP
Party key	TOP

Cabinet of Trinidad and Tobago
Portfolio	Minister
Prime Minister	Kamla Persad-Bissessar
Attorney-General	Anand Ramlogan
Minister of Foreign Affairs	Surujrattan Rambachan
Minister of Finance	Winston Dookeran
Minister of National Security	John Sandy
Minister of Trade and Industry	Stephen Cadiz
Minister of Local Government	Dr Chandresh Sharma
Minister of Education	Dr Tim Gopeesingh
Minister of Works and Transport	Jack Warner
Minister of Health	Therese Baptiste-Cornelis
Minister of Food Production, Land and Marine Affairs	Vasant Bharath
Minister of Public Administration	Rudrawatee Ramgoolam
Minister of Justice	Herbert Volney
Minister of Tourism	Rupert Griffith
Minister of Community Development	Nizam Baksh
Minister of the Arts and Culture	Winston Peters
Minister of Housing and the Environment	Roodal Moonilal
Minister of Planning, Economic and Social Restructuring and Gender Affairs	Bhoendradatt Tewarie
Minister of Energy and Energy Industries	Carolyn Seepersad-Bachan
Minister of Labour	Errol MacLeod
Minister of the People and Social Development	Glen Ramadhardsingh
Minister of Public Utilities	Emmanuel George
Minister of Legal Affairs	Prakash Ramadhar
Minister of Science, Technology and Tertiary Education	Fazal Karim
Minister of Sports and Youth Affairs	Anil Roberts
Minister of Tobago Development	Vernella Alleyne-Toppin

== June 22, 2012 - September 7, 2015 ==
Portfolio	Minister
Prime Minister	Kamla Persad-Bisessar
Attorney General	Garvin Nicholas
Minister of Housing	Roodal Moonilal
Minister of Legal Affairs	Prakash Ramadhar
Minister of the People	Glenn Ramadharsingh
Minister of Labour	Errol McLeod
Minister of Energy	Kevin Ramnarine
Minister of Planning	Bhoe Tewarie
Minister of Sport	Anil Roberts
Minister of Public Administration	Carolyn Seepersad-Bachan
Minister of Education	Tim Gopeesingh
Minister of Health	Fuad Khan
Minister of National Security	Emmanuel George
Minister of Communications	Jamal Mohammed
Minister of Gender, Youth and Child Development	Marlene Coudray
Minister of Transport	Chandresh Sharma
Minister of Tobago Development	Delmon Baker
Minister of Local Government & Minister of Works and Infrastructure	Surujrattan Rambachan
Minister of Public Utilities	Nizam Baksh
Minister of Arts and Multiculturalism	Lincoln Douglas
Minister of Tourism	Stephen Cadiz
Minister of Community Development	Winston Peters
Minister of Science and Technology	Rupert Griffith
Minister of Tertiary Education	Fazal Karim
Minister of Foreign Affairs	Winston Dookeran
Minister of the Environment and Water Resources	Ganga Singh
Minister of Food Production	Devant Maharaj
Minister of National Diversity and Social Integration	Clifton De Coteau
Minister of Finance	Larry Howai
Minister of Trade, Industry and Investment	Vasant Bharath
Minister in Ministry of the People	Vernella Alleyne-Toppin
Minister in the Ministry of Environment and Water Resources	Ramona Ramdial
Minister in the Ministry of National Diversity and Social Integration	Embau Moheni
Minister of State in the Ministry of Food Production	Jairam Seemungal
Minister of State in the Ministry of Works and Infrastructure	Stacy Roopnarine

Government offices
Preceded by Manning Administration	People's Partnership; 2010–2015	Succeeded by People's National Movement
