= Ernesto Kesar =

Trinidad and Tobago trade unionist and politician

The Honourable Ernesto Kesar MP

MP for Point Fortin
- Incumbent
- Assumed office 3 May 2025
- Preceded by: Kennedy Richards

Personal details
- Party: United National Congress (UNC)
- Other political affiliations: Movement for Social Justice (MSJ)

Ernesto Kesar is a Trinidad and Tobago trade unionist and politician who is the vice president of the Oilfields Workers' Trade Union (OWTU). He is the United National Congress member of parliament representing the Point Fortin constituency, and serves as Minister in the Ministry of Energy and Energy Industries.

== Career ==
Kesar worked for Petrotrin, and served as Trinmar branch president before becoming OWTU vice president.

== Politics ==
Kesar was a member of the Movement for Social Justice. In the 2010 general elections, he contested the La Brea seat on a UNC ticket as part of the People's Partnership coalition, but lost to the People's National Movement's Fitzgerald Jeffrey. In the 2020 general elections he was the MSJ's candidate in the Point Fortin constituency. Before resigning from the party to contest the 2025 elections as a candidate for the UNC, Kesar also served on MSJ's executive council.

He contested the Point Fortin seat for the UNC in the 2025 general elections, and defeated the PNM's Kennedy Richards. Kesar was the first non-PNM candidate to win the seat since 1986 when Selby Wilson of the National Alliance for Reconstruction won the seat.

On May 3, 2025 he was appointed Minister in the Ministry of Energy and Energy Industries in the Persad-Bissessar administration.

== Electoral history ==
2025 Trinidad and Tobago general election: Point Fortin
Party	Candidate	Votes	%	±%
UNC	Ernesto Kesar	7,293	51.5%	▲
PNM	Kennedy Richards	6,509	46.0%	▼
NTA	Errol Fabien	203	1.4%	Steady
All People's Party (Trinidad and Tobago)	Sheldon Khan	81	0.6%	Steady
Majority		784	5.5%	
Turnout		14,151	53.46%	
Registered electors		26,470		
UNC gain from PNM		Swing	%	
