= 2020 Trinidad and Tobago general election =

- 10 August 2020

All 41 seats in the House of Representatives 21 seats needed for a majority
- Turnout: 58.08% (▼8.76 pp)
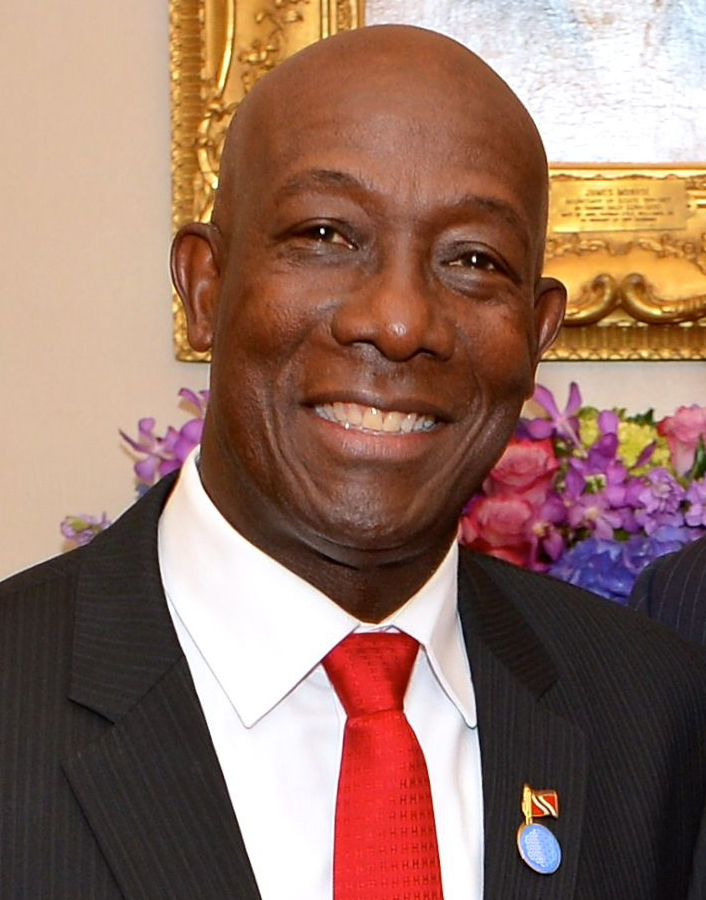

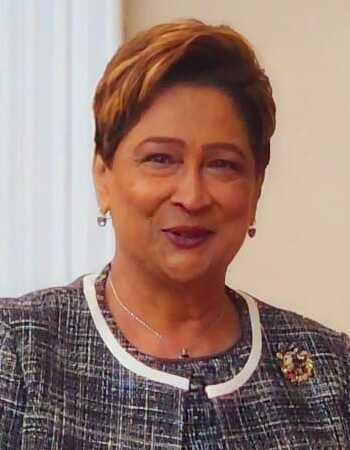
	First party	Second party
Leader	Keith Rowley	Kamla Persad-Bissessar
Party	PNM	UNC
Last election	51.68%, 23 seats	39.61%, 17 seats
Seats won	22	19
Seat change	▼1	▲2
Popular vote	322,180	309,654
Percentage	49.05%	47.14%
Swing	▼2.63 pp	▲7.53 pp
Prime Minister before election
Keith Rowley
PNM
Subsequent Prime Minister
Keith Rowley
PNM

General elections were held in Trinidad and Tobago on 10 August 2020, to elect 41 members to the 12th Trinidad and Tobago Republican Parliament. It was the 14th election since gaining independence from the United Kingdom in 1962 and the 22nd national election in Trinidad and Tobago. The result was a victory for the incumbent People's National Movement, which received 49.05% of the vote and won 22 of the 41 seats in the House of Representatives.

== Background ==
President Paula-Mae Weekes, with the advice of Prime Minister Keith Rowley, dissolved Parliament and issued the writs for the election on 3 July 2020.

The first-term incumbent People's National Movement (PNM), led by incumbent prime minister Keith Rowley, won 22 seats to form a second five-year term majority government by defeating the opposition United National Congress, led by Opposition Leader Kamla Persad-Bissessar who finished with 19 seats. The results in six constituencies were subject to recounts, causing the final election results to be delayed by a week. This is the first parliamentary election in Trinidad and Tobago where the result was not finalized the day after the election.

Tracy Davidson-Celestine, political leader of the Tobago Council of the People's National Movement (PNM) became the first woman to lead a Tobagonian political party with representation in the House of Representatives. Additionally, two of the three largest parties elected in 2015, the United National Congress (UNC) and the Congress of the People (COP), were led by women.

Voters elected the 41 members to the House of Representatives by first-past-the-post voting. Rowley and the new cabinet were sworn in on 19 August 2020.

== Electoral system ==
The 41 members of the House of Representatives are elected by first-past-the-post voting in single-member constituencies. Registered voters must be 18 years and over, must reside in an electoral district/constituency for at least two months prior to the qualifying date, be a citizen of Trinidad and Tobago or a Commonwealth citizen residing legally in Trinidad and Tobago for a period of at least one year.

If one party obtains a majority of seats, then that party is entitled to form the Government, with its leader as Prime Minister. If the election results in no single party having a majority, then there is a hung parliament. In this case, the options for forming the Government are either a minority government or a coalition government.

== Parties and candidates ==
Political parties registered with the Elections and Boundaries Commission (EBC) can contest the general election as a party.

The leader of the party commanding a majority of support in the House of Representatives is the person who is called on by the president to form a government as prime minister, while the leader of the largest party or coalition not in government becomes the Leader of the Opposition.

Prior to the election, the People's National Movement, led by Prime Minister Keith Rowley formed a majority government. The largest opposition party was the United National Congress, led by Kamla Persad-Bissessar. The Congress of the People was the sole other party in Parliament, represented by a single MP.

The People's National Movement and the United National Congress have been the two biggest parties, in addition to having supplied every prime minister since 1991.

On 14 July 2020, the leader of the Patriotic Front, Mickela Panday, announced that her party will no longer be contesting the 2020 elections due to lack of time to prepare for the August 2020 polls.

The following registered parties are contesting the general election, the People's National Movement is the only party fielding all 41 seats (39 in Trinidad and two in Tobago), 14 parties are contesting seats in Trinidad only and four parties are contesting seats in Tobago only.

== Campaign ==
Significant differences in the programs of the two major parties UNC and PNM cannot be identified. The UNC is traditionally more of an Indo-Trinidadian party, while Afro–Trinidadians and Tobagonians make up the majority of the PNM's base. In Trinidad, however, racial differences play a subordinate role, the dominant subject areas in the media are the stagnating economy and the high rate of violent crime; here both parties claim that they are better suited to combat them. In the closing stages of the election campaign, Prime Minister Rowley and citizens accused the UNC of using racist motives in its advertising campaign.

Some parties only represent regional positions. This applies in particular to the parties PDP and OTV, who are running exclusively in Tobago and advocate for regional interests of the island and the MND, which advocates the interests of the Diego Martin region.

The announcement by the opposition UNC that, in the event of an election victory, would build a “dome” over Trinidad to protect against illegal immigrants, made the election campaign relaxed. Before the UNC made it clear that it meant a radar screen, users of social media picked up the topic and indulged in humorous allusions to domes in films and television series.

As for the Leader of the Opposition, former prime minister and political leader of the UNC Kamla Persad-Bissessar, her latest in a series of losses at the polls which commenced with the January 2013 Tobago House of Assembly election with the wipeout of her People's Partnership-led administration from the Tobago House of Assembly due to a landslide victory by the Tobago Council of the PNM, losses at the 2013 Trinidadian local elections, St. Joseph and Chaguanas West bye-elections, loss in the 2015 Trinidad and Tobago general election, and subsequent losses in local government bye-elections has placed pressure on her to offer her resignation before the 2020 United National Congress leadership election. Additionally, she was threatened with death during the election campaign.

The resignation of former deputy PNM chairwoman Nafeesa Mohammed on July 28, who accused the PNM leadership of arrogance, ignorance and incompetence, caused a media stir. Minor parties and bodies called on the President to postpone the election in view of the COVID-19 pandemic, which was also rampant in Trinidad, but their requests were denied. A UNC supporter was stabbed on the sidelines of a UNC election campaign on the Saturday before the election.

=== Trinidad and Tobago ===
Party	Founded	Political position and ideology	Leader(s)	Leader since	Leader's seat	Last election		At dissolution	Contested seats
Party	Founded	Political position and ideology	Leader(s)	Leader since	Leader's seat	% party vote	Seats	At dissolution	Contested seats
Major party not part of any coalition
PNM	1955	Centre to centre-left Liberalism, Social liberalism, Nationalism	Keith Rowley	May 2010	Diego Martin West	51.69%	23 / 41 (56%)	23 / 41 (56%)	41 seats in Trinidad and Tobago

=== Trinidad only ===
Party	Founded	Political position and ideology	Leader(s)	Leader since	Leader's seat	Last election		At dissolution	Contested seats
Party	Founded	Political position and ideology	Leader(s)	Leader since	Leader's seat	% party vote	Seats	At dissolution	Contested seats
Major party not part of any coalition
UNC	1989	Centre-left; Social democracy, Civic nationalism	Kamla Persad-Bissessar	January 2010	Siparia	39.60%	17 / 41 (41%)	17 / 41 (41%)	39 seats in Trinidad
Better United Coalition
COP	2006	Centre-left; Reformism	Carolyn Seepersad-Bachan	November 2017	None	6.02%	1 / 41 (2%)	1 / 41 (2%)	4 seats in Trinidad
DPTT	2002		Steve Alvarez	April 2002	None	–	–	0 / 41 (0%)	1 seat in Trinidad
TTDF	2019		Nicholas Anthony Williams	August 2019	None	New party		0 / 41 (0%)	1 seat in Trinidad
Not part of any coalition
PEP	2017		Phillip Alexander	January 2017	None	New party		0 / 41 (0%)	28 seats in Trinidad
THC	2015		Marcus Ramkissoon	July 2015	None	0.02%	0 / 41 (0%)	0 / 41 (0%)	7 seats in Trinidad
NNV	1994	Social conservatism	Fuad Abu Bakr	April 2010	None	0.12%	0 / 41 (0%)	0 / 41 (0%)	6 seats in Trinidad
MSJ	2009	Left-wing; Socialism, Labourism, Direct democracy	David Abdulah	January 2012	None	–	–	0 / 41 (0%)	5 seats in Trinidad
MND	2019	Diego Martin regionalism	Garvin Nicholas	September 2019	None	New party		0 / 41 (0%)	3 seats in Trinidad
NCT	2013		Nalini Dial	July 2013	None	0.05%	0 / 41 (0%)	0 / 41 (0%)	2 seats in Trinidad
ILP	2013		Rekha Ramjit	October 2015	None	0.70%	0 / 41 (0%)	0 / 41 (0%)	1 seat in Trinidad
TNP	2017		Valmiki Ramsingh	July 2017	None	New party		0 / 41 (0%)	1 seat in Trinidad
UPP	2018	Right-wing; Christian right, Social conservatism	Kenneth Munroe-Brown	December 2018	None	New party		0 / 41 (0%)	1 seat in Trinidad
Progressive	2019	Centre to centre-left Progressivism, Decentralization, Localism	Nikoli Edwards	June 2019	None	New party		0 / 41 (0%)	1 seat in Trinidad
NOW	2020		Kirk Waithe	January 2020	None	New party		0 / 41 (0%)	1 seat in Trinidad

=== Tobago only ===
Party	Founded	Political position and ideology	Leader(s)	Leader since	Leader's seat	Last election		At dissolution	Contested seats
Party	Founded	Political position and ideology	Leader(s)	Leader since	Leader's seat	% party vote	Seats	At dissolution	Contested seats
Not part of any coalition
PDP	2016	Tobago regionalism	Watson Duke	July 2016	None	New party		0 / 41 (0%)	2 seats in Tobago
OTV	2019	Tobago regionalism	Hochoy Charles	October 2019	None	New party		0 / 41 (0%)	1 seat in Tobago
UTP	2020	Tobago regionalism	Nickocy Phillips	July 2020	None	New party		0 / 41 (0%)	1 seat in Tobago

=== Members of Parliament not standing for re-election ===
Retiring incumbent		Electoral District	Term in office	Date announced
Surujrattan Rambachan	UNC	Tabaquite	2010–2020	14 August 2019
Fuad Khan	UNC	Barataria/San Juan	1995–2007; 2010–2020	9 November 2019
Ganga Singh	UNC	Chaguanas West	1995–2007 (Caroni East); 2015–2020	8 March 2020
Maxie Cuffie	PNM	La Horquetta/Talparo	2015–2020	13 May 2020
Tim Gopeesingh	UNC	Caroni East	2007–2020	4 June 2020

=== Marginal seats ===
The following lists identify and rank seats by the margin by which the party's candidate finished behind the winning candidate in the 2015 election.

For information purposes only, seats that have changed hands through subsequent by elections have been noted. Seats whose members have changed party allegiance are ignored.

= appears in two lists

Marginal seats by party (with winning parties and margins from the 2015 Trinidad and Tobago general election)
People's National Movement			People's Partnership (UNC—COP—TOP)		
Marginal
1	Moruga/Tableland	2.53%	1	Barataria/San Juan	3.18%
2	St. Joseph	8.33%	2	Chaguanas East	7.95%
3	La Horquetta/Talparo	15.56%	3	Pointe-à-Pierre	8.39%
4	Tunapuna	19.13%	4	Mayaro	14.05%
5	Toco/Sangre Grande	19.20%	5	Cumuto/Manzanilla	15.95%
6	San Fernando West	19.39%	6	Fyzabad	18.92%
7	Point Fortin	20.94%	7	Caroni Central	26.11%
8	Lopinot/Bon Air West	28.10%	8	Tabaquite	31.12%
9	La Brea	33.45%	9	St. Augustine	33.57%
10	D'Abadie/O'Meara	34.20%	10	Couva North	34.17%
11	San Fernando East	37.33%	11	Princes Town	35.60%
12	Arima	40.12%	12	Couva South	38.83%
13	Diego Martin North/East	41.40%	13	Caroni East	44.79%
14	Diego Martin West	55.32%	14	Oropouche West	48.70%
15	St. Ann's East	56.55%	15	Siparia	51.60%
16	Diego Martin Central	59.77%	16	Oropouche East	60.02%
17	Port of Spain South	60.81%	17	Naparima	65.53%
18	Tobago East	60.88%	18	Chaguanas West	76.14%
19	Port of Spain North/St. Ann's West	65.62%			
20	Arouca/Maloney	63.10%			
21	Tobago West	73.48%			
22	Laventille East/Morvant	76.84%			
23	Laventille West	81.07%			
24	Tobago East	53.78%			
25	Tobago West	67.24%			
Safe
Source: Parliamentary Elections, 2015 Final Results – Candidates Vote Count

=== Campaign slogans ===
Party	Slogan
PNM	"The right choice".
UNC	"Now is the time."
COP	"Making the quantum leap".
DPTT	"The way forward for Trinidad and Tobago."
TTDF	"People first."
PEP	"Time for real change".
THC	"Good governance is at your fingertips".
NNV	"Believe in better".
MSJ	"Create a balance."
MND	"We are from Diego Martin, for Diego Martin".
NCT	"Think before you ink."
ILP	"Performance, Representation, Action".
TNP	"Change not exchange!"
UPP	
Progressive	"Progressive 2020. The new normal".: Progressive Party - De Guiding Flame (2020)
NOW	"Time is now."
PDP	"People before politics".
OTV	“Tobago must play as a team or lose by the fault.”
UTP	

== Opinion polls ==
Opinion research in the run-up to the election was carried out by the North American Caribbean Teachers Association (NACTA) and the management consultancy HHB Associates, among others. A NACTA poll shortly after the election date was announced, found that, as in most previous elections, only PNM and UNC would play a role. An HHB poll published July 25 in the Trinidad and Tobago Guardian found the ruling PNM at 53% and the UNC at 44%. A NACTA poll from July 25, however, saw the UNC one percentage point ahead. At this point in time, the tendency, known from previous elections, was that Trinidadians with African roots tend to choose the PNM and Trinidadians with Indian roots rather the UNC.

=== Graphical summary ===
View source data.
View source data.
View source data.

=== Seat projections ===
Date (Note: These are the survey dates of the poll, or if the survey dates are not stated, the date the poll was released.)	Pollster	Sample size	PNM	UNC	COP	Other	Legislative majority
10 Aug 2020	2020 general election		22	19	0	0	3
3 Jul 2020		Prime Minister Keith Rowley announces that the election will take place on 10 August 2020 and parliament is dissolved.					
1 Jun 2020		COVID-19 lockdown ends					
6 May 2020		Ancil Dennis becomes Chief Secretary of Tobago					
14 Apr 2020		COP, PPM, DPTT and TTDF agree to form a coalition.					
30 Mar 2020		Trinidad and Tobago commences a nationwide lockdown due to the COVID-19 pandemic					
12 Mar 2020		The first case of COVID-19 is confirmed in Trinidad and Tobago, pre-campaigning partially suspended on 13 March					
26 Jan 2020		2020 Tobago Council of the PNM election; Tracy Davidson-Celestine is elected leader					
2 Dec 2019		PNM wins more districts, ties in number of corporations won to the UNC in the 2019 Trinidadian local elections					
1 Oct 2019		The 2019 budget is delivered					
Aug 2019	NACTA/Newday	–	23	18	0	0	5
Apr 2019	NACTA/Newsday	–	26	15	0	0	11
Mar 2019	NACTA/Newsday	540	25	16	0	0	9
1 Oct 2018		The 2018 budget is delivered					
Sep 2018	NACTA/Newsday	–	23	18	0	0	5
16 July 2018		Barataria and Belmont East Local Government By-Elections					
19 Jan 2018		2018 Trinidad and Tobago presidential election; Paula-Mae Weekes is elected president					
19 Nov 2017		Carolyn Seepersad-Bachan is elected leader of the COP					
23 Jan 2017		The Tobago Council of the PNM wins the 2017 Tobago House of Assembly election; Kelvin Charles becomes Chief Secretary of Tobago					
7 Oct 2017		The 2017 budget is delivered					
28 Nov 2016		PNM wins the 2016 Trinidadian local elections					
30 Sep 2016		The 2016 budget is delivered					
10 Jul 2016		Anirudh Mahabir is elected leader of the COP					
3 Jul 2016		Kelvin Charles is elected leader of the Tobago Council of the PNM					
15 Dec 2015		The People's Partnership splits up					
7 Dec 2015		PNM wins the Auzonville/Tunapuna and Malabar South Local Government By-Elections					
28 Sep 2015		The 2015 budget is delivered					
9 Sep 2015		Keith Rowley is sworn in as Prime Minister of Trinidad and Tobago					
7 Sep 2015	2015 general election	–	23	17	1	0	5

=== Individual polls ===
Date	Pollster	Sample size	PNM	UNC	PDP	PEP	COP	Other	Lead
10 Aug 2020	2020 general election	–	49.1	47.1	1.6	0.9	0.1	1.3	1.99
July 24–31, 2020	SBS/Express	473	43	38	1	1	–	1	5
July 25, 2020	NACTA/Newsday	–	44	45	–	–	–	–	1
July 2020	H.H.B. & Associates/Guardian Media	600	35	29	–	–	0	2	6
7 Sep 2015	2015 general election	–	51.7	39.6	–	–	6.0	3.7	12.1

=== Regional and subnational polls ===
==== Tobago East ====
Date	Pollster	Sample size	PNM	PDP	Other	Lead
10 Aug 2020	2020 general election	–	54.35	44.74	0.91	9.61
July 2020	NACTA/Newsday	(380)	47	42	11	5
7 Sep 2015	2015 general election	–	69.48	–	30.52	53.78

==== Tobago West ====
Date	Pollster	Sample size	PNM	PDP	Other	Lead
10 Aug 2020	2020 general election	–	66.81	32.42	0.77	34.39
July 2020	NACTA/Newsday	(380)	48	40	12	9
7 Sep 2015	2015 general election	–	79.20	–	20.8	67.24

==== Moruga/Tableland ====
Date	Pollster	Sample size	PNM	UNC	Other	Lead
10 Aug 2020	2020 general election	–	35.92	52.34	11.74	16.42
July 25, 2020	H.H.B. & Associates/Guardian Media	200	34	23	43	11
7 Sep 2015	2015 general election	–	51.15	48.62	0.23	2.53

==== St. Joseph ====
Date	Pollster	Sample size	PNM	UNC	Other	Lead
10 Aug 2020	2020 general election	–	51.42	46.96	1.62	4.46
July 25, 2020	H.H.B. & Associates/Guardian Media	200	40	31	29	9
7 Sep 2015	2015 general election	–	53.77	45.44	0.79	8.33

==== San Fernando West ====
Date	Pollster	Sample size	PNM	UNC	Other	Lead
10 Aug 2020	2020 general election	–	54.51	42.87	2.62	11.64
July 25, 2020	H.H.B. & Associates/Guardian Media	–	49	29	22	20
7 Sep 2015	2015 general election	–	59.24	39.85	0.91	19.39

==== Tunapuna ====
Date	Pollster	Sample size	PNM	UNC	Other	Lead
10 Aug 2020	2020 general election	–	54.63	43.51	1.86	11.12
July 25, 2020	H.H.B. & Associates/Guardian Media	–	39	23	38	16
7 Sep 2015	2015 general election	–	59.42	40.29	0.29	19.13

==== Toco/Sangre Grande ====
Date	Pollster	Sample size	PNM	UNC	Other	Lead
10 Aug 2020	2020 general election	–	58.66	40.10	1.24	18.23
July 25, 2020	H.H.B. & Associates/Guardian Media	–	32	19	49	13
7 Sep 2015	2015 general election	–	59.04	39.84	0.91	19.20

=== Satisfaction ===
Date	Firm	Interview Mode	Sample size	Nathalie Arthaud			Nathalie Arthaud
Date	Firm	Interview Mode	Sample size	Rowley (PNM)			Persad-Bissessar (UNC)
				Satisfied	Dissatisfied	Never heard of	Satisfied	Dissatisfied	Never heard of
July 2020	H.H.B. & Associates/Guardian Media	Face-to-face	600	57%	43%	0%	53%	44%	3%
31 May 2020	NACTA/Newsday	n/a	n/a	53%	n/a	n/a	n/a	n/a	n/a
March 2020	NACTA/Newsday	n/a	n/a	46%	n/a	n/a	55%	n/a	n/a
1–7 September 2019	SBS/Express	Telephone	n/a	50%	38%	n/a	n/a	n/a	n/a
8 March 2019	NACTA/Newsday	Face-to-face	540	40%	47%	n/a	42%	44%	n/a
24 September 2017	NACTA/Newsday	Face-to-face	390	40%	n/a	n/a	42%	n/a	n/a
1–3 September 2017	H.H.B. & Associates/Guardian Media	Telephone	301	32%	n/a	n/a	43%	38%	n/a
July 2017	NACTA/Newsday	Face-to-face	410	41%	n/a	n/a	43%	n/a	n/a
June 2017	NACTA/Newsday	Face-to-face	380	42%	n/a	n/a	43%	n/a	n/a
30 August – 5 September 2016	SBS/Express	Telephone	601	51%	n/a	n/a	n/a	n/a	n/a
^ Remainder were "undecided".

=== Preferred prime minister ===
Date	Firm	Interview Mode	Sample size	Nathalie Arthaud	Nathalie Arthaud	Lead
Date	Firm	Interview Mode	Sample size	Rowley (PNM)	Persad-Bissessar (UNC)	Lead
July 2020	H.H.B. & Associates	Face-to-face	600	39%	34%	5%
March 2020	NACTA	n/a	n/a	43%	45%	2%
^ Remainder were "undecided".

=== Government direction ===
Date	Polling organisation	Interview Mode	Sample size	Right direction	Wrong direction	Lead
4 August 2020	SBS/Express	Telephone	473	47	41	6
24 September 2017	NACTA	Face-to-face	390	n/a	89	n/a
1–3 September 2017	H.H.B. & Associates	Telephone	301	n/a	83	n/a
July 2017	NACTA	Face-to-face	410	n/a	85	n/a
June 2017	NACTA	Face-to-face	380	n/a	83	n/a

=== Voter demographics ===
Voter demographic data for 2020 were collected by Solution by Simulation Ltd (SBS) for the Trinidad Express Newspapers completed by 473 likely voters in Trinidad and Tobago by phone and H.H.B. & Associates for the Trinidad and Tobago Guardian completed by 600 registered voters face-to-face suggested the following demographic breakdown:

2020 Trinidad & Tobago general election voter demographics (SBS)
Social group	%PNM	%UNC	% Lead
Total vote	43	38	5
Voter expectation (Better chance of winning)	47	35	12
Gender
Women	n/a	n/a	n/a
Age
18–39	50	42	8
40–64	41	35	6
65+	45	42	3
First time voter
Yes	n/a	n/a	n/a
Employment
Employed	n/a	n/a	n/a
Retirees	n/a	n/a	n/a
Unemployed	n/a	n/a	n/a
Race/ethnic group
African descent	77	13	64
East Indian descent	10	77	67
Mixed descent	48	23	25
Traditional election vote
PNM	85	9	76
UNC	11	82	71
Floating / 3rd Party	30	26	4
Country direction
Believes country is in right direction	77	11	66
Believes country is on wrong track	9	72	63
Likeliness of voting
Very Likely	46	39	7
Somewhat Likely	22	31	9
Issue regarded as most important
Coronavirus	65	18	47
Corruption	31	48	17
Crime	36	50	14
Economy	26	53	27
Performance-minded and issue-based voters
Performance-minded	37	50	13
Issue-based	64	27	37
Quality of representation over other concerns	n/a	n/a	n/a
Public perception
Ability to build and maintain infrastructure	n/a	n/a	8
Ability to reduce crime	n/a	n/a	n/a
COVID-19
More capable of handling the pandemic	n/a	n/a	n/a

2020 Trinidad & Tobago general election voter demographics in Trinidad (H.H.B. & Associates)
Social group	%PNM	%UNC	%COP	%Others	% Lead
Total vote	35.10	29.10	0.40	1.60	6.00
Race/ethnic group
Afro-Trinidadian	61.20	5.70	0.00	2.40	55.50
Indo-Trinidadian	7.30	54.70	0.00	0.40	47.40
Other / Mixed	44.10	18.90	1.80	2.70	25.20
Top Three Issues
Utilities (Water, light, etc.)	30	34			4
Unemployment/Jobs	35	36			1
Youth training and development	40	n/a			n/a
Race/ethnic group	%Keith Rowley	%Kamla Persad-Bissessar	%Other Person		% Lead
Best Prime Minister
Afro-Trinidadian	67.9	7.7	11.0		60.2
Indo-Trinidadian	10.8	61.2	12.5		50.4
Other / Mixed	45.0	26.1	9.0		18.9

== Conduct ==
The organization of the election was subject to the state Elections and Boundaries Commission (EBC). There were no election observers. Prime Minister Rowley revealed after the election that he had invited observers from CARICOM and the Commonwealth of Nations, but they were unable to pay for the 14-day quarantine required of foreign visitors.

The polling stations closed at 18:00 on election day.

== Results ==
At 22:30 on Election Day, Prime Minister Keith Rowley declared his party the winner of the election with 22 seats. UNC leader Persad-Bissessar declared wins in 19 seats, taking the Moruga/Tableland seat from the PNM and the St. Augustine seat from the COP. She disagreed with Rowley's victory declaration and objected to the long delays at polling stations.

In total, six seats won by the PNM were disputed: the UNC requested recounts for five constituencies in Trinidad (San Fernando West, St Joseph, Tunapuna, Toco-Sangre Grande and La Horquetta/Talparo), while the Progressive Democratic Patriots (PDP) requested a recount in Tobago East. The EBC took one week to conduct the recounts, observing only minor changes from the preliminary vote counts: the largest change was an increase of 103 votes for the UNC in San Fernando West. The counts for the other districts differed by ten votes or fewer. Rowley and the new PNM cabinet were then sworn in by President Paula-Mae Weekes on the following day, August 19. The ceremony was held at President's House.

Party	Votes	%	Seats	+/–
People's National Movement	322,180	49.05	22	–1
United National Congress	309,654	47.14	19	+2
Progressive Democratic Patriots	10,368	1.58	0	New
Progressive Empowerment Party	5,930	0.90	0	New
Independent Liberal Party	3,817	0.58	0	0
Movement for Social Justice	1,223	0.19	0	New
Movement for National Development	1,039	0.16	0	New
COP–DPTT–TTDF	524	0.08	0	–1
New National Vision	496	0.08	0	0
Trinidad Humanity Campaign	368	0.06	0	0
National Organisation of We the People	310	0.05	0	New
Progressive Party	212	0.03	0	New
National Coalition for Transformation	187	0.03	0	0
One Tobago Voice	80	0.01	0	New
Unrepresented Peoples Party	74	0.01	0	New
Unity of the People	40	0.01	0	New
The National Party	23	0.00	0	New
Independents	367	0.06	0	0
Total	656,892	100.00	41	0
Valid votes	656,892	99.73		
Invalid/blank votes	1,785	0.27		
Total votes	658,677	100.00		
Registered voters/turnout	1,134,135	58.08		
Source: EBCTT, IPU

=== Results by constituency ===
Electoral District	Electorate	Candidate	Party	Votes	%
Arima	26,382	Pennelope Beckles-Robinson	People's National Movement	9,293	68.90
Arima	26,382	Flora Singh	United National Congress	3,905	28.95
Arima	26,382	Sharon Hernandez	Progressive Empowerment Party	212	1.57
Arima	26,382	Nalini Dial	National Coalition for Transformation	48	0.36
Arima	26,382	Rejected ballots		30	0.22
Arouca/Maloney	26,673	Camille Robinson-Regis	People's National Movement	12,697	81.80
Arouca/Maloney	26,673	Cherry-Ann David	United National Congress	2,768	17.83
Arouca/Maloney	26,673	Rejected ballots		57	0.37
Barataria/San Juan	25,690	Saddam Hosein	United National Congress	8,300	52.63
Barataria/San Juan	25,690	Jason 'JW' Williams	People's National Movement	7,240	45.91
Barataria/San Juan	25,690	Albertha Purdeen	Progressive Empowerment Party	204	1.29
Barataria/San Juan	25,690	Rejected ballots		27	0.17
Caroni Central	30,107	Arnold Ram	United National Congress	11,511	61.63
Caroni Central	30,107	Reyad Ali	People's National Movement	6,890	36.89
Caroni Central	30,107	Lorena Lucien	Progressive Empowerment Party	245	1.31
Caroni Central	30,107	Rejected ballots		31	0.17
Caroni East	29,031	Rishad Seecheran	United National Congress	12,818	73.60
Caroni East	29,031	Sharon Archie	People's National Movement	4,271	24.52
Caroni East	29,031	Dave Babwah	Progressive Empowerment Party	296	1.70
Caroni East	29,031	Rejected ballots		30	0.17
Chaguanas East	26,923	Vandana Mohit	United National Congress	8,968	52.37
Chaguanas East	26,923	Clarence Rambharat	People's National Movement	7,882	46.03
Chaguanas East	26,923	Robert Matthew Gibbs	Progressive Empowerment Party	141	0.82
Chaguanas East	26,923	Shiraz Khan	Independent	79	0.46
Chaguanas East	26,923	Rejected ballots		53	0.31
Chaguanas West	28,625	Dinesh Rambally	United National Congress	15,832	88.47
Chaguanas West	28,625	Rackeal Bissoon	People's National Movement	1,878	10.49
Chaguanas West	28,625	Rahman Ali	New National Vision	138	0.77
Chaguanas West	28,625	Rejected ballots		48	0.27
Couva North	29,864	Ravi Ratiram	United National Congress	12,633	69.27
Couva North	29,864	Sharda Satram	People's National Movement	5,222	28.63
Couva North	29,864	Rohanie Debideen	Progressive Empowerment Party	259	1.42
Couva North	29,864	Joel Ramdhanie	Congress of the People	99	0.54
Couva North	29,864	Rejected ballots		25	0.14
Couva South	30,348	Rudranath Indarsingh	United National Congress	12,597	68.91
Couva South	30,348	Rajendra Rampersad	People's National Movement	5,542	30.32
Couva South	30,348	Linnell Doolan	Trinidad Humanity Campaign	106	0.58
Couva South	30,348	Rejected ballots		36	0.20
Cumuto/Manzanilla	30,468	Rai Ragbir	United National Congress	10,901	58.29
Cumuto/Manzanilla	30,468	Ronney Lochan	People's National Movement	7,557	40.41
Cumuto/Manzanilla	30,468	Anthony Henry	Progressive Empowerment Party	158	0.84
Cumuto/Manzanilla	30,468	Christopher Mathura	Trinidad Humanity Campaign	35	0.19
Cumuto/Manzanilla	30,468	Rejected ballots		51	0.27
D'Abadie/O'Meara	30,788	Lisa Morris-Julian	People's National Movement	11,864	66.49
D'Abadie/O'Meara	30,788	Maurice Hoyte	United National Congress	5,783	32.41
D'Abadie/O'Meara	30,788	Peter Amann	National Coalition for Transformation	139	0.78
D'Abadie/O'Meara	30,788	Rejected ballots		58	0.33
Diego Martin Central	29,609	Symon de Nobriga	People's National Movement	10,627	74.08
Diego Martin Central	29,609	John Ricardo Laquis	United National Congress	2,692	18.76
Diego Martin Central	29,609	Felicia Holder	Progressive Empowerment Party	404	2.82
Diego Martin Central	29,609	Garvin Nicholas	Movement for National Development	374	2.61
Diego Martin Central	29,609	Renee St Rose	Movement for Social Justice	120	0.84
Diego Martin Central	29,609	Ashton Francis	New National Vision	69	0.48
Diego Martin Central	29,609	Rejected ballots		60	0.42
Diego Martin North/East	29,273	Colm Imbert	People's National Movement	10,218	73.73
Diego Martin North/East	29,273	Eli Zakour	United National Congress	2,827	20.40
Diego Martin North/East	29,273	Phillip Edward Alexander	Progressive Empowerment Party	436	3.15
Diego Martin North/East	29,273	Myron Bruce	Movement for National Development	209	1.51
Diego Martin North/East	29,273	Lonsdale Williams	Congress of the People	133	0.96
Diego Martin North/East	29,273	Rejected ballots		35	0.25
Diego Martin West	29,886	Keith Rowley	People's National Movement	10,791	77.37
Diego Martin West	29,886	Marsha Riley-Walker	United National Congress	2,569	18.42
Diego Martin West	29,886	Dexter Nicholls	Movement for National Development	456	3.27
Diego Martin West	29,886	Zafir David	Trinidad Humanity Campaign	93	0.67
Diego Martin West	29,886	Rejected ballots		39	0.28
Fyzabad	27,447	Lackram Bodoe	United National Congress	10,850	60.13
Fyzabad	27,447	Solange De Souza	People's National Movement	6,888	38.17
Fyzabad	27,447	Alice Narine	Progressive Empowerment Party	143	0.79
Fyzabad	27,447	Radhaka Gualbance	Movement for Social Justice	127	0.70
Fyzabad	27,447	Rejected ballots		37	0.21
La Brea	26,008	Stephen McClashie	People's National Movement	9,342	60.00
La Brea	26,008	Victor Roberts	United National Congress	5,735	36.83
La Brea	26,008	Marlon Greaves	Movement for Social Justice	223	1.43
La Brea	26,008	Rondoll Glasgow	Progressive Empowerment Party	129	0.83
La Brea	26,008	Callum Marshall	New National Vision	71	0.46
La Brea	26,008	Rejected ballots		71	0.46
La Horquetta/Talparo	27,528	Foster Cummings	People's National Movement	9,714	54.89
La Horquetta/Talparo	27,528	Jearlean John	United National Congress	7,793	44.03
La Horquetta/Talparo	27,528	Benet Thomas	Progressive Empowerment Party	145	0.82
La Horquetta/Talparo	27,528	Rejected ballots		46	0.26
Laventille East/Morvant	26,644	Adrian Leonce	People's National Movement	10,356	82.40
Laventille East/Morvant	26,644	Kareem Baird	United National Congress	1,965	15.63
Laventille East/Morvant	26,644	Christopher Roberts	Progressive Empowerment Party	169	1.34
Laventille East/Morvant	26,644	Umar Khan	New National Vision	39	0.31
Laventille East/Morvant	26,644	Rejected ballots		39	0.31
Laventille West	25,585	Fitzgerald Hinds	People's National Movement	9,310	83.25
Laventille West	25,585	Rodney Stowe	United National Congress	1,324	11.84
Laventille West	25,585	Kirk Waithe	National Organisation of We the People	310	2.77
Laventille West	25,585	Natalia Moore	Progressive Empowerment Party	126	1.13
Laventille West	25,585	Kurt Sinnette	Congress of the People	47	0.42
Laventille West	25,585	Sandra Emmanuel	New National Vision	32	0.29
Laventille West	25,585	Rejected ballots		34	0.30
Lopinot/Bon Air West	27,864	Marvin Gonzales	People's National Movement	9,608	55.95
Lopinot/Bon Air West	27,864	Jack Warner	Independent Liberal Party	3,817	22.23
Lopinot/Bon Air West	27,864	Prakash Williams	United National Congress	3,587	20.89
Lopinot/Bon Air West	27,864	Dominique Lopez	Progressive Empowerment Party	123	0.72
Lopinot/Bon Air West	27,864	Rejected ballots		36	0.21
Mayaro	28,834	Rushton Paray	United National Congress	10,593	58.73
Mayaro	28,834	Bunny Mahabirsingh	People's National Movement	7,229	40.08
Mayaro	28,834	Sterling Lee Ha	Progressive Empowerment Party	133	0.74
Mayaro	28,834	Rejected ballots		81	0.45
Moruga/Tableland	29,043	Michelle Benjamin	United National Congress	10,534	52.30
Moruga/Tableland	29,043	Winston 'Gypsy' Peters	People's National Movement	9,462	46.98
Moruga/Tableland	29,043	Steve Alvarez	Democratic Party of Trinidad and Tobago	37	0.18
Moruga/Tableland	29,043	Thomas Sotillio	Independent	25	0.12
Moruga/Tableland	29,043	Larry Sanchar	Trinidad Humanity Campaign	13	0.06
Moruga/Tableland	29,043	Rejected ballots		70	0.35
Naparima	27,066	Rodney Charles	United National Congress	13,306	82.92
Naparima	27,066	Randy Sinanan	People's National Movement	2,686	16.74
Naparima	27,066	Rejected ballots		54	0.34
Oropouche East	28,271	Roodal Moonilal	United National Congress	13,737	79.84
Oropouche East	28,271	Clifford Rambharose	People's National Movement	3,416	19.85
Oropouche East	28,271	Rejected ballots		52	0.30
Oropouche West	25,289	Davendranath Tancoo	United National Congress	11,535	74.26
Oropouche West	25,289	Lea Ramoutar	People's National Movement	3,708	23.87
Oropouche West	25,289	Sasha Ali	Progressive Empowerment Party	250	1.61
Oropouche West	25,289	Rejected ballots		41	0.26
Point Fortin	26,003	Kennedy Richards	People's National Movement	9,276	59.10
Point Fortin	26,003	Taharqa Obika	United National Congress	5,761	36.70
Point Fortin	26,003	Ernesto Kesar	Movement for Social Justice	545	3.47
Point Fortin	26,003	Kenesha Ramsoondar	Progressive Empowerment Party	58	0.37
Point Fortin	26,003	Nicholas Anthony Williams	Trinidad and Tobago Democratic Front	20	0.13
Point Fortin	26,003	Rejected ballots		36	0.23
Pointe-à-Pierre	25,096	David Lee	United National Congress	8,869	53.38
Pointe-à-Pierre	25,096	Daniel Dookie	People's National Movement	7,357	44.28
Pointe-à-Pierre	25,096	David Abdulah	Movement for Social Justice	208	1.25
Pointe-à-Pierre	25,096	Marvyn Howard	Progressive Empowerment Party	144	0.87
Pointe-à-Pierre	25,096	Rejected ballots		37	0.22
Port-of-Spain North/St. Ann's West	25,003	Stuart Young	People's National Movement	9,475	81.08
Port-of-Spain North/St. Ann's West	25,003	Darren Garner	United National Congress	1,705	14.59
Port-of-Spain North/St. Ann's West	25,003	Limma Mc Leod	Progressive Empowerment Party	385	3.29
Port-of-Spain North/St. Ann's West	25,003	Kenneth Munroe-Brown	Unrepresented Peoples Party	74	0.63
Port-of-Spain North/St. Ann's West	25,003	Rejected ballots		47	0.40
Port-of-Spain South	24,754	Keith Scotland	People's National Movement	8,199	78.25
Port-of-Spain South	24,754	Curtis Orr	United National Congress	1,850	17.66
Port-of-Spain South	24,754	Gail Castanada	Progressive Empowerment Party	256	2.44
Port-of-Spain South	24,754	Fuad Abu Bakr	New National Vision	147	1.40
Port-of-Spain South	24,754	Rejected ballots		26	0.25
Princes Town	27,178	Barry Padarath	United National Congress	11,280	69.51
Princes Town	27,178	Sharon Baboolal	People's National Movement	4,708	29.01
Princes Town	27,178	Kim Young Low	Progressive Empowerment Party	209	1.29
Princes Town	27,178	Rejected ballots		32	0.20
San Fernando East	25,008	Brian Manning	People's National Movement	9,862	67.60
San Fernando East	25,008	Monifa Andrews	United National Congress	4,689	32.14
San Fernando East	25,008	Rejected ballots		38	0.26
San Fernando West	25,035	Faris Al-Rawi	People's National Movement	8,459	54.20
San Fernando West	25,035	Sean Sobers	United National Congress	6,754	43.28
San Fernando West	25,035	Nikoli Edwards	Progressive Party	212	1.36
San Fernando West	25,035	Benison Jagessar	Progressive Empowerment Party	128	0.82
San Fernando West	25,035	Valmiki Ramsingh	The National Party	23	0.15
San Fernando West	25,035	Rejected ballots		31	0.20
Siparia	28,663	Kamla Persad-Bissessar	United National Congress	13,487	77.52
Siparia	28,663	Rebecca Dipnarine	People's National Movement	3,855	22.16
Siparia	28,663	Rejected ballots		56	0.32
St. Ann's East	29,454	Nyan Gadsby-Dolly	People's National Movement	10,979	74.23
St. Ann's East	29,454	Kenya Charles	United National Congress	3,438	23.25
St. Ann's East	29,454	Akil Camps	Progressive Empowerment Party	327	2.21
St. Ann's East	29,454	Rejected ballots		46	0.31
St. Augustine	28,094	Khadijah Ameen	United National Congress	11,943	67.46
St. Augustine	28,094	Renuka Sagramsingh-Sooklal	People's National Movement	5,264	29.73
St. Augustine	28,094	Satesh Ramsaran	Progressive Empowerment Party	235	1.33
St. Augustine	28,094	Carolyn Seepersad-Bachan	Congress of the People	188	1.06
St. Augustine	28,094	Michlin Hosein-Phelps	Trinidad Humanity Campaign	33	0.19
St. Augustine	28,094	Rejected ballots		42	0.24
St. Joseph	28,452	Terrence Deyalsingh	People's National Movement	9,362	51.46
St. Joseph	28,452	Ahloy Hunt	United National Congress	8,539	46.94
St. Joseph	28,452	Errol Fabien	Independent	220	1.21
St. Joseph	28,452	Joel Williams	Trinidad Humanity Campaign	30	0.16
St. Joseph	28,452	Rejected ballots		42	0.23
Tabaquite	28,832	Anita Haynes	United National Congress	11,440	67.62
Tabaquite	28,832	Michael Seales	People's National Movement	5,209	30.79
Tabaquite	28,832	Carl Henry	Progressive Empowerment Party	221	1.31
Tabaquite	28,832	Rejected ballots		48	0.28
Tobago East	23,102	Ayanna Webster-Roy	People's National Movement	7,128	54.36
Tobago East	23,102	Watson Duke	Progressive Democratic Patriots	5,866	44.73
Tobago East	23,102	Juliana Henry-King	One Tobago Voice	80	0.61
Tobago East	23,102	Rejected ballots		39	0.30
Tobago West	27,686	Shamfa Cudjoe	People's National Movement	9,202	66.63
Tobago West	27,686	Tashia Grace Burris	Progressive Democratic Patriots	4,502	32.60
Tobago West	27,686	Ricardo Phillip	Independent	43	0.31
Tobago West	27,686	Nickocy Phillips	Unity of the People	40	0.29
Tobago West	27,686	Rejected ballots		24	0.17
Toco/Sangre Grande	31,096	Roger Monroe	People's National Movement	10,694	58.67
Toco/Sangre Grande	31,096	Nabila Greene	United National Congress	7,303	40.07
Toco/Sangre Grande	31,096	Kevon Hernandez	Progressive Empowerment Party	166	0.91
Toco/Sangre Grande	31,096	Rejected ballots		63	0.35
Tunapuna	27,433	Esmond Forde	People's National Movement	9,460	54.63
Tunapuna	27,433	David Nakhid	United National Congress	7,533	43.50
Tunapuna	27,433	Maurice Downes	Progressive Empowerment Party	228	1.32
Tunapuna	27,433	Marcus Ramkissoon	Trinidad Humanity Campaign	58	0.33
Tunapuna	27,433	Rejected ballots		37	0.21

== Reactions ==
=== Domestic reactions ===
- President of Trinidad and Tobago Paula-Mae Weekes in her address "wished the Prime Minister and his Cabinet success in the delivery of their mandate and urged them to get down to the serious business of the good governance of the people of Trinidad and Tobago."
- Tobago: Chief Secretary of Tobago Ancil Dennis issued "congratulations to Prime Minister Dr. The Honourable Keith Christopher Rowley and his new Cabinet".

=== Regional reactions ===
- CARICOM
  - “Prime Minister, your success at the polls is an indication of the confidence that the people of Trinidad and Tobago have in your stewardship and the plans you have outlined for their future,” Ambassador LaRocque said in his congratulatory message to Dr. Rowley.
- CARICOM / St. Vincent and the Grenadines
  - CARICOM Chairman and Prime Minister of Saint Vincent and the Grenadines Ralph Gonsalves tweeted: "Congratulations to my brother and friend Dr Keith Rowley and the PNM team on their electoral victory last night. We look forward to growing our already strong relationship with the government and people of TT."
- St. Lucia
  - Prime Minister of Saint Lucia Allen Chastanet, in a statement expressed: "Congratulations to Dr. Keith Rowley and the People's National Movement on their new mandate to continue serving Trinidad & Tobago for 5 more years. We wish you, your team and the people of T&T great success throughout this new term and we look forward to working together to build a more united and prosperous region 🇱🇨🇹🇹"
- Belize
  - The Ministry of Foreign Affairs (Belize) tweeted: "Congratulations to Hon. @DrKeithRowley on his successful re-election as Prime Minister of the Republic of Trinidad and Tobago @OPM_TT during yesterday's general elections held in challenging circumstances occasioned by the #COVID19 pandemic "
- Antigua and Barbuda
  - Prime Minister of Antigua and Barbuda Gaston Browne in a letter sent congratulations to Trinidad and Tobago Prime Minister Dr Keith Rowley on his impending re-election, stating "I wish your Government and the people of Trinidad and Tobago every good fortune as you continue to the task of strengthening your great country.”
- Grenada
  - Prime Minister of Grenada Keith Mitchell congratulated Prime Minister Rowley indicating that "the results show that the people of Trinidad and Tobago are confident in Dr Rowley's leadership abilities, and are looking to you for continued direction to steer the country further along the path of development. With the support of his Cabinet and people, I am confident Dr Rowley will succeed in pushing forward the country's agenda, so that everyone can benefit.'
  - Leader of the largest opposition party in Grenada Franka Bernardine on behalf of her party National Democratic Congress and the people of Grenada congratulated Prime Minister Rowley on his re-election as Prime Minister of the Republic of Trinidad and Tobago noting 'the use of the virtual platform was new and added a unique dynamic to an already robust and grounded PNM team. The sharp focus and hard work of your campaign team were, no doubt vital to your success.'"
- St. Kitts and Nevis
  - Prime Minister of Saint Kitts and Nevis Timothy Harris congratulated Prime Minister Rowley on his re-election and the PNM, during a press conference held on Tuesday August 11.
- Guyana
  - The opposition People's National Congress led by former president of Guyana David A. Granger congratulated Prime Minister Rowley and the People's National Movement (PNM) on their victory at the General Elections in Trinidad and Tobago on the August 10, 2020.
- Montserrat
  - Premier of Montserrat Joseph Farrell issued a diplomatic note stating “It is truly my great honour, on behalf of the Government and people of Montserrat, to extend best wishes to you and the People's National Movement (PNM) in the fulfillment of this high office for which you were successfully returned for another term.”

=== International reactions ===
- Organization of American States
  - Secretary General of the Organization of American States Luis Almagro tweeted from his official Twitter account: "Our congratulations to Prime Minister @DrKeithRowley. Count on our will to work together to strengthen the pillars of the @OAS_official beginning with development."
- Organisation of African, Caribbean and Pacific States
  - Secretary-General Georges Rebelo Chikoti congratulated the Prime Minister Keith Rowley, on his party's victory at the polls and on his re-election for a second term as Prime Minister of Trinidad and Tobago.paying special congratulations to the candidates and that the people of the twin island nation, "through this election, have once again demonstrated their commitment to democracy, peace and stability."
- Venezuela
  - The Ministry of Communication and Information and Minister of Foreign Affairs Jorge Arreaza tweeted a statement from President of Venezuela Nicolás Maduro using their official accounts where he extended "congratulations to the people of the Republic of Trinidad and Tobago, for the successful holding of the general elections held on Monday, August 10, 2020, in which Prime Minister Keith Rowley was re-elected." President Maduro subsequently phoned Prime Minister Keith Rowley to congratulate him, exchanging experiences in the fight against the COVID-19 pandemic in addition to impressions of the bilateral agenda."
- Nicaragua
  - President of Nicaragua Daniel Ortega and Vice President of Nicaragua Rosario Murillo sent a message to Prime Minister Keith Rowley on his victory in the elections writing "with Fraternal Solidarity we celebrate your Triumph yesterday, Monday, August 10, which accredits and confirms You and your Party, the People's National Movement (PNM), for a New Mandate to lead and accompany your People, in these complex Times, with Stability, Work, Health and Peace."
- Canada
  - The Canadian High Commission in Trinidad and Tobago using their official Twitter account expressed: "Congratulations to Prime Minister Dr. Keith Rowley on his re-election as Prime Minister of the Republic of Trinidad and Tobago. Canada looks forward to advancing our longstanding friendship and continuing to collaborate in areas important to both Canada and #TrinidadAndTobago."
- United States
  - Western Hemisphere Affairs Assistant Secretary Michael Kozak using his official Twitter account expressed: "Today the people of Trinidad and Tobago swear in a prime minister, elected in a transparent process that accurately reflects their will. The United States congratulates @DrKeithRowley on his election victory, & wishes the people of Trinidad and Tobago continuing prosperity."
  - United States Chamber of Commerce
- United Kingdom
  - Parliamentary Under Secretary of State (Minister for the Overseas Territories and Sustainable Development) Liz Sugg, Baroness Sugg tweeted from her official account "My congratulations to @DrKeithRowley on your re-election, and on today's swearing-in to office. I look forward to our continued partnership as the UK and Trinidad & Tobago work together to fight #Covid19, deepen our security cooperation & combat the threat of climate change 🇬🇧🇹🇹"
  - British High Commissioner Tim Stew using his official Twitter account expressed: "Congratulations @DrKeithRowley on your re-election success! T&T 🇹🇹 & the UK 🇬🇧 enjoy a strong partnership. I look forward to that partnership depending & prospering in the years ahead."
  - Councilor and subsequently Mayor of the London Borough of Haringey, a twin town of Arima, Adam Jogee using his official Twitter account expressed his congratulations noting that the re-election was a " solid win for our sister party after a spirited campaign!"
- Mexico
  - The Embassy of Mexico in Trinidad and Tobago using its official Twitter account sent congratulations to the new government of Trinidad and Tobago.
- China
  - Premier of the People's Republic of China Li Keqiang sent a congratulatory message to Prime Minister Keith Rowley noting the 46 friendly years of diplomatic relations between China and Trinidad and Tobago and that the two countries opened a new page in the history of bilateral friendship by supporting each other in the fight against the COVID-19 epidemic.
- Japan
  - Japan Ambassador to Trinidad and Tobago Tatsuo Hirayama phoned Prime Minister Rowley congratulating him on his re-election as the Prime Minister, and also exchanging views on the bilateral relations between Japan and Trinidad and Tobago.
