= Diego Martin Central =

Trinidad and Tobago parliamentary constituency

- Constituency for the Parliament of Trinidad and Tobago
- Electorate: 17,334 (2015)

Current constituency
- Created: 1981
- Number of members: 1
- Member of Parliament: Symon de Nobriga (PNM)

Diego Martin Central is a parliamentary electoral district in Trinidad and Tobago in the north-west of Trinidad. It has been represented since the 2020 general election by Symon de Nobriga of the People's National Movement (PNM).

== Constituency profile ==
The constituency was created prior to the 1981 general election. It borders the constituencies of Diego Martin North/East, Diego Martin West, and Port of Spain South. It contains a number of communities in Diego Martin, including Petit Valley, Diamond Vale, Four Roads and Blue Range. It had an electorate of 17,334 as of 2015.

== Members of Parliament ==
This constituency has elected the following members of the House of Representatives of Trinidad and Tobago:

Election	Years	Member	Party	Notes
1981	9 November 1981 – 15 December 1986	Joseph Laquis	PNM	
1986	15 December 1986 – 16 December 1991	Leo Des Vignes	NAR	
1991	16 December 1991 – 5 November 2007	Kenneth Valley	PNM	
2007	5 November 2007 – 7 September 2015	Amery Browne	PNM	
2015	7 September 2015 – 10 August 2020	Daryl Smith	PNM	
2020	10 August 2020 – Present	Symon de Nobriga	PNM	

== Election results ==
=== Elections in the 2020s ===
2025 Trinidad and Tobago general election: Diego Martin Central
Party	Candidate	Votes	%	±%
PNM	Symon de Nobriga	7,409	56.4%	▼
UNC	Keron Thomas	4,600	35.0%	▲
NTA	Russel Chan	1,085	8.3%	Steady
Majority		2,809	21.4%	▼
Turnout		13,149	44.39%	
Registered electors		29,623		
PNM hold				

General election 2020: Diego Martin Central
Party	Candidate	Votes	%	±%
PNM	Symon de Nobriga	10,627	74.39	
UNC	John Laquis	2,692	18.84	
PEP	Felicia Holder	404	2.83	
MND	Garvin Nicholas	374	2.62	
MSJ	Renée St. Rose	120	0.84	
NNV	Ashton Francis	69	0.48	
Majority		7,935	55.54	
Turnout		14,286	48.25	
PNM hold		Swing		

=== Elections in the 2010s ===
General election 2015: Diego Martin Central
Party	Candidate	Votes	%	±%
PNM	Darryl Smith	13,258	77.02	
NJAC	Embau Moheni	2,969	17.25	
NNV	Kefentse Gervais	586	3.4	
ILP	Kathy-Ann Lamont	401	2.33	
Majority		10,289	59.77	
Turnout		17,214	58.65	
PNM hold		Swing		

General election 2010: Diego Martin Central
Party	Candidate	Votes	%	±%
PNM	Amery Browne	9,040	52.36	
COP	Nicole Dyer-Griffith	8,047	46.61	
NNV	Nigel Telesford	145	0.84	
Majority		993	5.75	
Turnout		17,265	62.86	
PNM hold		Swing		
