= Persad-Bissessar Administration (disambiguation) =

Persad-Bissessar Administration may refer to:

- Persad-Bissessar administration (2010–2015)
- Persad-Bissessar administration (2025–)
