= Tabaquite (parliamentary constituency) =

Trinidad and Tobago parliamentary constituency

- Constituency for the Parliament of Trinidad and Tobago
- Tabaquite is number 29
- Electorate: 28,217 (2015)

Current constituency
- Created: 1966
- Number of members: 1
- Member of Parliament: Sean Sobers (UNC)

Tabaquite is a parliamentary electoral district in Trinidad and Tobago in the south-west of Trinidad. It has been represented since the 2025 general election by Sean Sobers from the United National Congress (UNC). It was previously held by Anita Haynes of the UNC since 2020.

== Constituency profile ==
The constituency was created prior to the 1966 general election. It borders the constituencies of Pointe-à-Pierre, Naparima, Couva South, Mayaro, Princes Town, Caroni Central and La Horquetta/Talparo. The main towns are Tabaquite, Piparo, Bonne Aventure, and Gasparillo. It is the country's second largest constituency and is considered a safe seat for the United National Congress. It had an electorate of 28,217 as of 2015.

== Members of Parliament ==
This constituency has elected the following members of the House of Representatives of Trinidad and Tobago:

Election	Years	Member	Party	Notes
1966	7 November 1966 – 24 May 1971	Shafeyei Mohammed Shah	DLP	
1971	24 May 1971 – 13 September 1976	Hugo Abdul Hakh Ghany	PNM	
1976	13 September 1976 – 9 November 1981	Winston Nanan	ULF	
1981	9 November 1981 – 15 December 1986	Nizam Mohammed	ULF	
1986	15 December 1986 – 16 December 1991	Nizam Mohammed	NAR	
1991	16 December 1991 – 6 November 1995	Carl R. Singh	UNC	
1995	6 November 1995 – 5 November 2007	Adesh Nanan	UNC	
2007	5 November 2007 – 24 May 2010	Ramesh Maharaj	UNC	
2010	24 May 2010 – 10 August 2020	Surujrattan Rambachan	UNC	
2020	10 August 2020 – 18 March 2025	Anita Haynes	UNC	
2025	3 May 2025 – Present	Sean Sobers	UNC	

== Election results ==
=== Elections in the 2020s ===
2025 Trinidad and Tobago general election: Tabaquite
Party	Candidate	Votes	%	±%
UNC	Sean Sobers	11,615	73.7%	▲
PNM	Marisha Alvarado	3,436	21.8%	▼
PF	Amzad Mohammed	668	4.2%	Steady
Majority		8,179	51.9%	
Turnout		15,765	54.6%	
Registered electors		28,876		
UNC hold		Swing	%	

General election 2020: Tabaquite
Party	Candidate	Votes	%	±%
UNC	Anita Haynes	11,440	67.81	
PNM	Michael Seales	5,209	30.88	
PEP	Carl Russel Henry	221	1.31	
Majority		6,231	36.94	
Turnout		16,870	58.51	
UNC hold		Swing		

=== Elections in the 2010s ===
General election 2015: Tabaquite
Party	Candidate	Votes	%	±%
UNC	Surujrattan Rambachan	12,804	65.56	
PNM	Kevin Craig Chan	6,726	34.44	
Majority		6,078	31.12	
Turnout		19,530	69.21	
UNC hold		Swing		

General election 2010: Tabaquite
Party	Candidate	Votes	%	±%
UNC	Surujrattan Rambachan	14,310	72.54	
PNM	Farouk Mohammed	5,350	27.12	
Majority		8,960	45.42	
Turnout		19,727	73.68	
UNC hold		Swing		
