= Lovell Francis =

Trinidad and Tobago diplomat and politician

Trinidad and Tobago Ambassador to South Africa
- Incumbent
- Assumed office 17 August 2021
- Prime Minister: Keith Rowley

Member of Parliament for Moruga/Tableland
- In office 9 September 2015 – 9 August 2020
- Preceded by: Clifton De Coteau
- Succeeded by: Michelle Benjamin

Personal details
- Party: People's National Movement (PNM)
- Education: University of the West Indies

Lovell Macio Michael Francis is a Trinidad and Tobago politician and diplomat. He is the current High Commissioner for Trinidad and Tobago to the Republic of South Africa. Francis was previously a Member of Parliament in the House of Representatives for Moruga/Tableland between 2015 and 2020, when he served as Minister of State in the Ministry of Education.

== Early life ==
Francis completed his PhD at the University of the West Indies at St. Augustine. He presented his thesis, Transformation in the Trinidadian Sugar Industry: Caroni, State Intervention and the Sugar Sub Sector in Trinidad 1970–2005, on 20 June 2012. He then worked as a university lecturer at the University of the West Indies.

== Political career ==
Francis was elected to the House of Representatives as the Member of Parliament for Moruga/Tableland in the 2015 general election. He served as a member for the People's National Movement (PNM). He was appointed as the Minister of State in the Ministry of Education on 23 September 2015, a position that he held until 9 August 2020. He had responsibility for tertiary education. It was predicted that he would be appointed as Minister of Public Administration after Marlene McDonald's position was revoked. He was not selected by the PNM screening committee to re-contest his seat in the 2020 general election. Instead the PNM nominated Winston Peters, who ultimately lost to the United National Congress's Michelle Benjamin.

== Diplomatic career ==
Francis was appointed as High Commissioner to the Republic of South Africa on 17 August 2021. He was received by President Paula-Mae Weekes in his new position on 26 October 2021.
