= Diego Martin West =

Trinidad and Tobago parliamentary constituency

- Constituency for the Parliament of Trinidad and Tobago
- Electorate: 29,349 (2015)

Current constituency
- Created: 1966
- Number of members: 1
- Member of Parliament: Hans des Vignes (PNM)

Diego Martin West is a parliamentary electoral district in Trinidad and Tobago in the north-west of Trinidad. It has been represented by Hans des Vignes of the People's National Movement (PNM) since 2025. It was previously held by former Prime Minister Keith Rowley since 1991.

== Constituency profile ==
The constituency was created prior to the 1966 general election. It borders the constituencies of Diego Martin North/East and Diego Martin Central, as well as the Caribbean Sea and Gulf of Paria. The main towns are Carenage, Westmoorings, Chaguaramas, and it contains the islands of Gaspar Grande, Monos, Huevos and Chacachacare. It had an electorate of 29,349 as of 2015.

== Members of Parliament ==
This constituency has elected the following members of the House of Representatives of Trinidad and Tobago:

Election	Years	Member	Party	Notes
1966	7 November 1966 – 24 May 1971	John O'Halloran	PNM	
1971	24 May 1971 – 13 September 1976	Cyril Launcelot Brown	PNM	
1976	13 September 1976 – 9 November 1981	Hugh Francis	PNM	
1986	15 December 1986 – 16 December 1991	Margaret Hector	NAR	
1991	16 December 1991 – 18 March 2025	Keith Rowley	PNM	
2025	3 May 2025 – Present	Hans des Vignes	PNM	

== Election results ==
=== Elections in the 2020s ===
2025 Trinidad and Tobago general election: Diego Martin West
Party	Candidate	Votes	%	±%
PNM	Hans des Vignes	7,703	62.3%	▼15.28
PEP	Janice Learmond-Criqui	3,257	26.4%	Steady
NTA	Marsha Walker	1,336	10.8%	Steady
Majority		4,446	35.9%	▼17.87
Turnout		12,358	41.24%	
Registered electors		29,967		
PNM hold				

General election 2020: Diego Martin West
Party	Candidate	Votes	%	±%
PNM	Keith Rowley	10,791	77.58	
UNC	Marsha Loraine Walker	2,569	18.47	
MND	Roger Dexter Nicholls	456	3.28	
THC	Zafir David	93	0.67	
Majority		8,222	59.11	
Turnout		13,909	46.54	
PNM hold		Swing		

=== Elections in the 2010s ===
General election 2015: Diego Martin West
Party	Candidate	Votes	%	±%
PNM	Keith Rowley	12,855	76.03	
COP	Avonelle Arlette Hector	3,411	20.18	
Independent	Phillip Edward Alexander	246	1.46	
NNV	Fuad Abu Bakr	194	1.15	
ILP	Taja Appolonia Carrington	118	0.7	
THC	Zafir David	83	0.5	
Majority		9,444	55.86	
Turnout		16,907	57.61	
PNM hold		Swing		

General election 2010: Diego Martin West
Party	Candidate	Votes	%	±%
PNM	Keith Rowley	9,042	52.42	
COP	Rocky Neil Garcia	7,996	46.36	
NNV	Saaleha Zawadi Abu Bakr	149	0.86	
Majority		1,046	6.06	
Turnout		17,248	60.8	
PNM hold		Swing		
