= Margaret Hector =

Trinidad and Tobago politician

Member of Parliament for Diego Martin West
- In office 15 December 1986 – 16 December 1991
- Preceded by: Hugh Francis
- Succeeded by: Keith Rowley

Personal details
- Party: National Alliance for Reconstruction

Margaret Hector (died 2013) was a Trinidad and Tobago politician from the National Alliance for Reconstruction.

== Career ==
Before entering politics, Hector worked as a waitress. She was elected in the 1986 Trinidad and Tobago general election for the constituency of Diego Martin West. She remains the only non-People's National Movement candidate to win the seat. In the National Alliance for Reconstruction administration she served as Parliamentary Secretary of Health, Welfare and the Status of Women and as a Minister in the Office of the Prime Minister. She was succeeded by future prime minister Keith Rowley in the 1991 general election.

== Personal life ==
Margaret Hector died in 2013. Her daughter Avonelle Hector contested Diego Martin West for the Congress of the People (COP) in the 2015 Trinidad and Tobago general election. Avonelle Hector-Joseph is the founder of the NGO "Is There Not a Cause". The organisation engages in humanitarian efforts.

== See also ==
- List of Trinidad and Tobago MPs
