= Kennedy Richards =

Trinidad and Tobago politician

The Honourable Kennedy Richards

Member of Parliament for Point Fortin
- In office 19 August 2020 – 18 March 2025
- Preceded by: Edmund Dillon
- Succeeded by: Ernesto Kesar

Personal details
- Born: 1987 (age 38–39)
- Party: PNM

Kennedy Richards Jr. (born 1987) is a Trinidad and Tobago politician from the People's National Movement (PNM). He represented Point Fortin in the House of Representatives from 2020 to 2025.

== Career ==
Before entering politics, Richards worked as a pilot for Caribbean Airlines. In 2019, he became mayor of Point Fortin at the age of 32. He also serves as a councillor for Hollywood in Point Fortin. His father, Kennedy Richards Sr., was also a councillor in the area.

In the 2020 Trinidad and Tobago general election, he was elected to parliament. He stood for the 2025 Trinidad and Tobago general election, but he was unseated by Ernesto Kesarof the United National Congress (UNC).

== Electoral history ==
2025 Trinidad and Tobago general election: Point Fortin
Party	Candidate	Votes	%	±%
UNC	Ernesto Kesar	7,293	51.5%	▲
PNM	Kennedy Richards	6,509	46.0%	▼
NTA	Errol Fabien	203	1.4%	Steady
All People's Party (Trinidad and Tobago)	Sheldon Khan	81	0.6%	Steady
Majority		784	5.5%	
Turnout		14,151	53.46%	
Registered electors		26,470		
UNC gain from PNM		Swing	%	

== See also ==
- 12th Republican Parliament of Trinidad and Tobago
