= Symon de Nobriga =

Trinidad and Tobago politician

Member of Parliament for Diego Martin Central
- Incumbent
- Assumed office 10 August 2020
- Preceded by: Daryl Smith

Personal details
- Party: People's National Movement

Symon de Nobriga is a Trinidad and Tobago politician from the People's National Movement (PNM). He has been MP for Diego Martin Central in the House of Representatives since 2020. He was minister of communications under Keith Rowley. He was elected to a second term in the 2025 Trinidad and Tobago general election.

== Personal life ==
He is divorced and a father of two.

== Electoral history ==
2025 Trinidad and Tobago general election: Diego Martin Central
Party	Candidate	Votes	%	±%
PNM	Symon de Nobriga	7,409	56.4%	▼
UNC	Keron Thomas	4,600	35.0%	▲
NTA	Russel Chan	1,085	8.3%	Steady
Majority		2,809	21.4%	▼
Turnout		13,149	44.39%	
Registered electors		29,623		
PNM hold				

== See also ==
- 12th Republican Parliament of Trinidad and Tobago
- 13th Republican Parliament of Trinidad and Tobago
