= Hans des Vignes =

Trinidad and Tobago politician (born 1985)

The Honourable Hans des Vignes MP

MP for Diego Martin West
- Incumbent
- Assumed office May 2025
- Preceded by: Keith Rowley

Personal details
- Party: People's National Movement
- Website: www.hansdesvignes.com

Hans Aaron des Vignes (born May 25, 1985) is a Trinidad and Tobago media personality and politician.

== Career ==
Des Vignes joined an aspiring DJs group known as the Militant Crew when he turned sixteen. As part of the group, he appeared on the long-time talent show Da Flava.

He was one of the hosts on the entertainment series, EZone. Party Flava talent face off where he first met soca star Umi Marcano who was at the time one of the competitors in the show. Des Vignes later went on to manage Marcano.

Des Vignes went on to work as a full-time presenter/producer of De Scene on Synergy TV and a radio presenter on 94.1 FM. He eventually left E-Zone and produced Synergy TV's soca star and Super Model. He partnered with one of his former managers to form Hand to Hand Productions.

He later hosted Rated C on CNMG and as a producer his work can be seen through the programmes "Second Stage", "Talkz" and "Bounce".

== Politics ==
Des Vignes was the People's National Movement candidate for the Diego Martin West seat in the 2025 general elections, a seat left open when former prime minister Keith Rowley chose not to stand for re-election. Des Vignes was selected by the PNM after the former front-runner, Amery Browne, withdrew his name from consideration.

He was successful in the race, and was elected to Parliament.

=== Electoral history ===
2025 Trinidad and Tobago general election: Diego Martin West
| Party | Candidate | Votes | % | ±% |
|---|---|---|---|---|
| PNM | Hans des Vignes | 7,703 | 62.3% | ▼15.28 |
| PEP | Janice Learmond-Criqui | 3,257 | 26.4% | Steady |
| NTA | Marsha Walker | 1,336 | 10.8% | Steady |
| Majority | | 4,446 | 35.9% | ▼17.87 |
| Turnout | | 12,358 | 41.24% | |
| Registered electors | | 29,967 | | |
| PNM hold | | | | |

== Personal life ==
Hans is the son of forensic pathologist, Hughvon des Vignes.
