= Progressive Party (Trinidad and Tobago) =

Political party in Trinidad and Tobago

- Leader: Nikoli Edwards
- Chairperson: vacant
- Deputy Leader: Morgan Ramkallawan
- Founder: Nikoli Edwards
- Founded: June 16, 2019
- Ideology: Progressivism; Decentralization
- Political position: Centre to centre-left
- Colors: Blue
- House of Representatives: 0 / 41
- Regional municipalities: 0 / 139
- Regional corporations: 0 / 14
- Tobago House of Assembly: 0 / 12

Election symbol
- Guiding Flame

Website
- http://progressives.tt/

The Progressive Party (colloquially known as "The Progressives") is a political party in Trinidad and Tobago. The party was founded on June 16, 2019 by former independent senator Nikoli Edwards to contest the 2020 Trinidad and Tobago general election. The Progressives currently do not hold any seats in the House of Representatives, Regional municipalities, Regional corporations or in the Tobago House of Assembly.

== History ==
The Progressive Party held its first General Meeting in San Fernando, Trinidad and Tobago on December 15, 2019. At that meeting, the party's constitution was ratified, and six of the seven members of the Board of Directors were appointed. The Board of Directors will serve until the Party General Assembly of 2021. In his keynote address, Party Leader Nikoli Edwards outlined his party's policies and vision for Trinidad and Tobago, stating that Trinidad could not achieve progress under the two leading parties in Trinidad, the United National Congress (UNC) and the ruling People's National Movement (PNM).

At the first General Meeting, Edwards made the declaration that he will be contesting the constituency of San Fernando West which is currently represented by Faris Al-Rawi, Attorney General of Trinidad and Tobago.

== List of political leaders ==
The political leaders of the Progressive Party have been as follows (any acting leaders indicated in italics):

Key:

Progressive UNC PNM

PM: Prime Minister

LO: Leader of the Opposition

Leader		Term of Office		Position	Prime Minister
1	Nikoli Edwards	15 December 2019	Incumbent		Rowley

== Electoral history ==
=== House of Representatives ===
Election	Party leader	Votes			Seats		Position	Government
Election	Party leader	No.	%	±	No.	±	Position	Government
2020	Nikoli Edwards	211	0.03		0 / 41		13th	PNM

== Party leadership ==
Position	Officeholder	Term of Office		Constituency
Party Chairperson	vacant			
Political Leader	Nikoli Edwards	December 15, 2019	Incumbent	Candidate for San Fernando West
Deputy Political Leader	Morgan Ramkallawan	December 15, 2019	Incumbent	
Secretary		December 15, 2019	Incumbent	
Chief Policy and Strategy Officer	Kieran Khan	December 15, 2019	Incumbent	
Chief Financial Officer	Nichelle Baptiste	December 15, 2019	Incumbent	
Chief Communications Officer	Anthony Burnley	December 15, 2019	Incumbent	

== Political positions ==
The Progressives identify with progressivism, as well as the centre-left. The party believes in maintaining a small to moderately-sized government that focuses on helping citizens to realise their fullest potential in a reasonably regulated environment.
