= Chaguanas West =

Trinidad and Tobago parliamentary constituency

- Constituency for the Parliament of Trinidad and Tobago
- Chaguanas West is number 21 on this map
- Electorate: 24,272 (2007); 25,715 (2010); 27,704 (2015)
- Major settlements: Chaguanas

Current constituency
- Created: 2007
- Number of members: 1
- Member of Parliament: Colin Neil Gosine (UNC)

Chaguanas West is a parliamentary constituency in Trinidad and Tobago. It was created in 2007 alongside Chaguanas East when the Chaguanas constituency was divided.

== Geography ==
The constituency contains the western areas of the town of Chaguanas. It had an electorate of 25,488 as of 2015.

== Members ==
Election	Member	Party	Notes
2007	Jack Warner	UNC	
2010	Jack Warner	UNC	
2013 by-election	Jack Warner	UNC	
2015	Ganga Singh	UNC	
2020	Dinesh Rambally	UNC	
2025	Colin Neil Gosine	UNC	

== Elections ==
2025 Trinidad and Tobago general election: Chaguanas West
Party	Candidate	Votes	%	±%
UNC	Colin Neil Gosine	16,013	88.7%	▲
PNM	Winston Mahabir	1,390	7.7%	▼
PF	Marsha George	599	3.3%	Steady
Majority		14,623	81.0%	
Turnout		18,046	62.14%	
Registered electors		29,043		
UNC hold				
