= Point Fortin (parliamentary constituency) =

Trinidad and Tobago parliamentary constituency

- Constituency for the House of Representatives
- Point Fortin is number 41 on this map
- Electorate: 25,505 (2015)
- Major settlements: Point Fortin

Current constituency
- Created: 1961
- Number of members: 1
- Member of Parliament: Ernesto Kesar (UNC)

Point Fortin is a parliamentary constituency in Trinidad and Tobago.

== Geography ==
The constituency covers the town of Point Fortin. It had an electorate of 25,505 as of 2015.

== Members ==
Election	Member	Party	Notes
1961	Cuthbert Johnson	PNM	
1966	John Reginald Fitzroy Richardson	PNM	
1971	John Reginald Fitzroy Richardson	PNM	
1976	Cyril Rogers	PNM	
1981	Cyril Rogers	PNM	
1986	Selby Wilson	NAR	
1991	Vincent Lasse	PNM	
1995	Vincent Lasse	PNM	
2000	Lawrence Achong	PNM	
2001	Lawrence Achong	PNM	
2002	Lawrence Achong	PNM	
2007	Paula Gopee-Scoon	PNM	
2010	Paula Gopee-Scoon	PNM	
2015	Edmund Dillon	PNM	
2020	Kennedy Richards	PNM	
2025	Ernesto Kesar	UNC	

== Elections ==
2025 Trinidad and Tobago general election: Point Fortin
Party	Candidate	Votes	%	±%
UNC	Ernesto Kesar	7,293	51.5%	▲
PNM	Kennedy Richards	6,509	46.0%	▼
NTA	Errol Fabien	203	1.4%	Steady
All People's Party (Trinidad and Tobago)	Sheldon Khan	81	0.6%	Steady
Majority		784	5.5%	
Turnout		14,151	53.46%	
Registered electors		26,470		
UNC gain from PNM		Swing	%	
