= Devant Maharaj =

Trinidad and Tobago politician

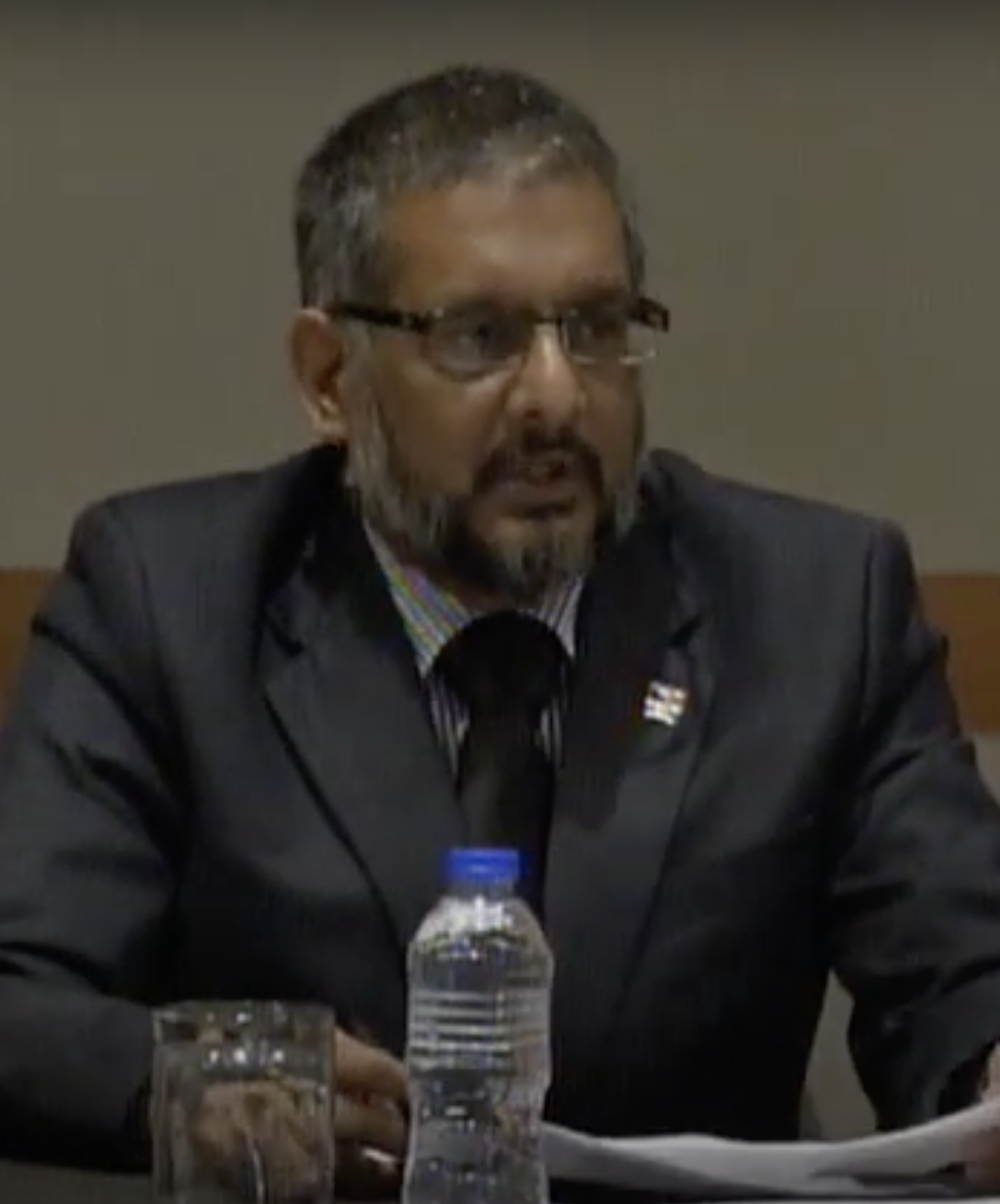
Devant Maharaj

Devant Maharaj is a Trinidad and Tobago politician, and social activist. He is a inactive member of the United National Congress. On 27 June 2011, he became a member of the Senate of the Republic of Trinidad and Tobago and Minister of Transport following his appointment as Chairman of the Public Services Transport Corporation of Trinidad and Tobago.

Maharaj was a member of the People's Partnership Government led by Prime Minister Kamla Persad-Bissessar. On 22 June 2013, Maharaj was reassigned to the portfolio of Minister of Agriculture. Maharaj remained a member of the Opposition Party of Trinidad and Tobago after the Peoples Partnership (UNC-Led Alliance) lost the 2015 general election.

== Background ==
Maharaj background includes Indo-Trinidadian writer, cultural, social and political activist whose ancestors came from Uttar Pradesh, India in the 1870s to work on the sugar plantations of Trinidad and Tobago as indentured servants. Devant Maharaj was an executive member of the Sanatan Dharma Maha Sabha (SDMS) - the largest Hindu body in Trinidad and Tobago and as such has been primarily associated with Indian and Hindu activity associated with the SDMS. He was the youngest member of the SDMS when he was appointed in 1996.

In 1996, Devant, along with the Trinidad Express Columnist Kamal Persad, began the first Indian oriented radio talk show in Trinidad called "The Hindu View Point" which ran for 2 years on 91.1 FM. This was the forerunner to many Indian talk shows that later evolved on the island nation.

Maharaj was subsequently a weekly columnist with the Trinidad Newsday from 1997-2005 but he has also been published in the Trinidad Guardian. A prolific writer on Indo-Caribbean issues Maharaj has also been published in several regional and international newspapers including The Jamaica Gleaner, The Barbados Nation, The St. Lucia Star, India Post, Asian Age, BJP Today, Hinduism Today, Indian Express, India Abroad, to name a few.

In 2002, Maharaj was appointed the SDMS Delegate to the Inter-Religious Organization (IRO) of Trinidad & Tobago and was again the youngest member of the IRO. The Inter Religious Organization formed in the 1970s brings all major religious groupings on the island for regular discussions so to build greater religious understanding. Maharaj held this position in the IRO until 2006. In 2005, Maharaj was appointed by the SDMS as Chairman of the Indian Caribbean Museum. Located in Waterloo, Carapichaima, this body was established to collect artifacts on the Indian presence in the Caribbean. The Museum has since grown attracting visitors locally and internationally.

In August 2006, he left the public service to assume the position of Chief Executive Officer of SDMS’s Radio Jaagriti 102.7 FM. Maharaj has presented many papers at a variety of forums on Indian and Hindu issues within Trinidad and Tobago. Maharaj is also the co-editor of the book "Hostile & Recalcitrant" and has also self-published booklets titled "The Persistence of the Indian Identity" and "Clash of Cultures: Indian African Clash".

In November 2007, Devant Maharaj unsuccessfully contested the Couva South constituency for the newly formed Congress of the People led by Winston Dookeran in the General Elections.

== Global Organization for People of Indian Origin ==
In 2002, Maharaj was appointed President of Global Organization for People of Indian Origin (GOPIO) Chapter by the International parent body. Since that time GOPIO Trinidad has become a virtual household name as the organization challenged issues of discrimination. With GOPIO Maharaj launched a National Awards in 2004 to protest the State’s National Awards, in particular, the Trinity Cross which awarded annually and was seen as biased against Indians and non-Christians. The GOPIO National Awards placed additional pressure on the Government to eventually declare that it would fundamentally change the State awards.

In 2005, GOPIO was successful in court when it took the Telecommunications Authority of Trinidad & Tobago for failing to investigate claims that certain radio stations were making anti-Indian and anti-Hindu statements. The TATT was forced to investigate GOPIO allegations. In 2004, the International Organization of Caribbean People Inc., (IOCP Inc.) the U.S. based non-profit human rights organization headed by Trinidad born, Maria "Francisca" Seebaran-Dayman, in collaboration with the Center for International Human Rights Advocacy, University of Denver formulated a blueprint petition regarding the crime of kidnapping that was prevalent in Trinidad & Tobago. This proposed petition to the Inter-American Commission on Human Rights provided for the first time, empirical evidence that Indo-Trinidadians were the primary targets of kidnappers. The study forced the Minister of National Security to take immediate action.

When Maharaj decided to enter into politics GOPIO International publicly requested his resignation as President of GOPIO Trinidad. Maharaj cited other active politicians such as Ramesh Maharaj, who held office with GOPIO and refused to acquiesce with the international body’s request. Maharaj and the entire Trinidad Chapter Executive threatened to resign if Maharaj was made to resign. The International body backed down from this demand; however, in early 2008 the international body launched another chapter in Trinidad. Maharaj eventually in 2008 formed the Indo-Trinbago Equality Council [ITEC] abandoning GOPIO.

== In government ==
As Transport Minister, Devant Maharaj announced, in keeping with the government's promise, to upgrade the Camden Airstrip in Couva, central Trinidad into a domestic airport, despite it being a mere 26 miles (42 kilometers) from the islands's existing airport, also in central Trinidad in Piarco. Maharaj stated that the airport would initially handle domestic flights but this project was later shelved. As Minister of Food Production food inflation reduced to single-digit figures, the food import bill dropped and a number of new food initiatives were launched.

== Legal challenges to the government ==
Devant Maharaj was the Marketing & Public Relations Officer of the National Lotteries Control Board of Trinidad & Tobago from 1993 to 2004, and Deputy Director, and NLCB since 2004.

Due to Maharaj's Indian activism, he has faced numerous challenges from the State and has had to go to court on numerous occasions as a result. In 2002 the Prime Minister of Trinidad and Tobago, Patrick Manning, vetoed his promotion. Maharaj was the most senior officer for the position of Deputy Director, he topped the appointment interview, and was recommended for the position by the independent Statutory Authorities Service Commission [SASC]. The Commission, however, sought the concurrence of the Prime Minister – a 35-year-old practice. Maharaj, as a result, took the government to court and as a result, the 35-year practice of Prime Ministerial veto was deemed illegal and brought to an immediate end.

Following this victory, the challenges at the NLCB intensified for Maharaj and he had to seek refuge in the courts again, each time contesting issues that impacted upon all public officers of Trinidad & Tobago.

In 2005, Maharaj sought information from the SASC using the Freedom of Information Act about promotions at the NLCB. The SASC responded to Maharaj but via his employers, the NLCB. Maharaj challenged this shunting of responses via a third party that he suspected was working against his professional career. The courts again ruled that Maharaj right to the information requested by public officers should not go through a third party and also that he was unfairly treated by the State in the manner and way in which it made promotions. The judgment was critical of political appointee’s interference of public officers in promotions and their career development.

In 1999, Trinidad and Tobago introduced the Freedom of Information Act to open the records of Government to the citizens. Maharaj was a "citizen trailblazer" in pioneering the use of the Freedom of Information Act in requesting information from the State. In several instances, State agencies and Government Ministries refused to provide Maharaj the information requested citing various reasons. Maharaj, as a result, sought Judicial Review on the state’s decision not to provide the information. In all instances Maharaj’s legal challenge was successful. The successful use of the Freedom of Information Act by Maharaj has resulted in several forms of administrative reactions by the State including making the Central Bank of Trinidad and Tobago exempt from the Freedom of Information Act with retroactive legislation. Maharaj’s attorney in all of his legal challenges was Constitutional Rights attorney at law Anand Ramlogan. In several cases Ramlogan was led by former Attorney General of Guyana Sir Fenton Ramsahoye.

Following the change of Government in 2015, Maharaj and Ramlogan continued their challenges in the Courts including a challenge to the Property Tax of Trinidad and Tobago as well as the appointments to the Judicial and Legal Services Commission.

== Social media ==
Maharaj advocated the Opposition position since demitting office on several social media platforms. This has resulted in the Government accusing Maharaj of being unpatriotic, seditious and treasonous. The release by Maharaj of the mobile numbers of the Prime Minister and other Ministers evoked the ire of the Government further. Maharaj's home was raided by the police following a social media post that prompted the Media Association to defend his right to protect his source.
