= Anita Haynes =

Trinidad and Tobago politician

Anita Haynes Alleyne

Member of Parliament for Tabaquite
- In office 19 August 2020 – 18 March 2025
- Prime Minister: Keith Rowley
- Preceded by: Surujrattan Rambachan
- Succeeded by: Sean Sobers

Personal details
- Party: United National Congress

Anita Haynes-Alleyne was a Trinidad and Tobago politician representing the United National Congress (UNC).

She served as a Member of Parliament in the House of Representatives for Tabaquite from the 2020 general election until 2025. She was previously an Opposition Senator from 2017 to 2020 under the UNC.

She is the first female MP for Tabaquite.

== Early life ==
Haynes grew up in Piparo, Trinidad. Her father is a police officer and her mother is a real estate agent, and she is the eldest of three daughters. She graduated from St Joseph's Convent, San Fernando in 2006, where she was the president of the debating team. She attended St John's University in New York on a full scholarship where she initially studied finance before switching her major to government and politics. She moved back to Trinidad and Tobago in 2011 when Kamla Persad-Bissessar was elected as the first female prime minister. She also received a Law degree from the University of London.

== Political career ==
Haynes began her political career by getting a job at the Office of the Prime Minister, working in multilateral relations. She joined the United National Congress and became their Public Relations Officer in July 2017. She was appointed as an Opposition Senator for the United National Congress on 29 September 2017, where she served as the lead for Foreign Affairs, Energy Affairs, Communications, Education, and Youth Affairs.

She was elected to the Trinidad and Tobago House of Representatives on 10 August 2020 after the 2020 general election. She is a member for the electoral district of Tabaquite, a traditionally safe seat for the United National Congress. She is also the Shadow Minister of Education.

She was deselected for the 2025 Trinidad and Tobago general election. She was replaced as candidate by Sean Sobers.

== See also ==
- 12th Republican Parliament of Trinidad and Tobago
