= Caroni East =

Trinidad and Tobago parliamentary constituency

- Constituency for the Parliament of Trinidad and Tobago
- Caroni East is number 25 on this map
- Electorate: 27,602 (2015)
- Major settlements: Caroni County

Current constituency
- Created: 1961
- Number of members: 1
- Member of Parliament: Rishad Seecheran (UNC)

Caroni East is a parliamentary constituency in Trinidad and Tobago.

== Geography ==
Caroni Central is located in the eastern areas of the Caroni Plain. It had an electorate of 27,602 as of 2015.

== Members ==
Election	Member	Party	Notes
1961	Balgobin Ramdeen	DLP	
1966	Hansley Hanoomnsingh	DLP	
1971	Selwyn Charles	PNM	
1976	Paul Harrison	ULF	
1981	Manichan Ramsaran	PNM	
1986	Bhoendradatt Tewarie	NAR	
1991	Shamshuddin Mohammed	UNC	
1995	Ganga Singh	UNC	
2000	Ganga Singh	UNC	
2001	Ganga Singh	UNC	
2002	Ganga Singh	UNC	
2007	Tim Goopesingh	UNC	
2010	Tim Goopesingh	UNC	
2015	Tim Goopesingh	UNC	
2020	Rishad Seecheran	UNC	
2025	Rishad Seecheran	UNC	

== Elections ==
2025 Trinidad and Tobago general election: Caroni East
Party	Candidate	Votes	%	±%
UNC	Rishad Seecheran	13,957	80.6%	▲6.9
PNM	Leena Rampersad	2,757	15.9%	▼8.67
PF	Danielle Grell	561	3.2%	Steady
Majority		11,200	64.7%	
Turnout		17,315	57.32%	
Registered electors		30,208		
UNC hold				
