= Selwyn Charles =

Trinidadian cricketer

Personal information
- Born: 30 May 1936; Trinidad
- Died: 7 June 2000 (aged 64); Chase Village, Chaguanas, Trinidad and Tobago
- Source: Cricinfo, 28 November 2020

Selwyn Charles (30 May 1936 – 7 June 2000) was a Trinidadian cricketer and parliamentarian.

Charles played in three first-class matches for Trinidad and Tobago in 1958/59 and 1959/60. He worked for the Trinidad and Tobago Telephone Company. He represented the Caroni East Constituency in the Parliament of Trinidad and Tobago from 1971 to 1976 as a member of the People's National Movement.
