= Moruga/Tableland =

Trinidad and Tobago parliamentary constituency

- Constituency for the House of Representatives
- Moruga/Tableland is number 35 on this map
- Electorate: 27,913 (2015)
- Major settlements: Moruga, Tableland

Current constituency
- Created: 2010
- Number of members: 1
- Member of Parliament: Michelle Benjamin (UNC)

Moruga/Tableland is a parliamentary constituency in Trinidad and Tobago.

== Geography ==
The constituency covers the villages of Moruga and Tableland and its environs. It had an electorate of 27,913 as of 2015.

== Members ==
Election	Member	Party	Notes
2010	Clifton De Coteau	UNC	
2015	Lovell Francis	PNM	
2020	Michelle Benjamin	UNC	
2025	Michelle Benjamin	UNC	

== Elections ==
2025 Trinidad and Tobago general election: Moruga/Tableland
Party	Candidate	Votes	%	±%
UNC	Michelle Benjamin	11,083	57.0%	▲4.5
PNM	Lisa Atwater	7,983	41.1%	▼6.0
PF	Trivet Phillip	281	1.4%	Steady
Majority		3,100	15.9%	
Turnout		19,448	65.38%	
Registered electors		29,744		
UNC hold		Swing	%	
