= Clifton De Coteau =

Trinidad and Tobago politician

The Honourable Clifton De Coteau MP

Member of Parliament for Moruga/Tableland
- In office 28 May 2010 – 17 June 2015
- Preceded by: constituency established
- Succeeded by: Lovell Francis

Personal details
- Died: January 22, 2021
- Party: United National Congress (UNC)

Clifton De Coteau (died January 22, 2021) was a Trinidad and Tobago politician from the United National Congress (UNC). He was a member of the House of Representatives.

== Biography ==
De Coteau participated in sporting events such as marathons, track and field, boxing, kickboxing and wrestling. He was the former principal of the St Stephen's College, Princes Town. He served as a cabinet minister under Kamla Persad-Bissessar.
