= Rishad Seecheran =

Trinidad and Tobago politician

The Honourable Rishad Seecheran MP

Member of Parliament for Caroni East
- Incumbent
- Assumed office 19 August 2020
- Preceded by: Tim Goopesingh

Personal details
- Party: United National Congress (UNC)

Rishad (Rishi) Seecheran is a Trinidad and Tobago politician from the United National Congress. He represents Caroni East in the House of Representatives.

He is a dental surgeon by profession. He was elected to the seat of Caroni East in the 2020 Trinidad and Tobago general election. In parliament he focuses on healthcare affairs.

Seecheran was re-elected in the 2025 Trinidad and Tobago general election. He was appointed Minister in the Ministry of Health by Prime Minister Kamla Persad-Bissessar.

== Electoral history ==
2025 Trinidad and Tobago general election: Caroni East
Party	Candidate	Votes	%	±%
UNC	Rishad Seecheran	13,957	80.6%	▲6.9
PNM	Leena Rampersad	2,757	15.9%	▼8.67
PF	Danielle Grell	561	3.2%	Steady
Majority		11,200	64.7%	
Turnout		17,315	57.32%	
Registered electors		30,208		
UNC hold				
