= Michelle Benjamin =

Trinidad and Tobago politician

Member of Parliament for Moruga/Tableland
- Incumbent
- Assumed office 10 August 2020
- Preceded by: Lovell Francis

Personal details
- Party: United National Congress
- Education: University of the West Indies

Michelle Benjamin is a Trinidad and Tobago politician representing the United National Congress. She has served as a Member of Parliament in the House of Representatives for Moruga/Tableland since the 2020 general election.

== Early life ==
Benjamin was born in St Mary’s Village, Moruga. She attended St Mary’s Government Primary School, Cowen Hamilton Secondary School and Southern Community College. She then received a diploma in computer studies from the School of Accounting and Management and a bachelor's of science in environmental and natural resource management and biology from the University of the West Indies. She previously worked for the Ministry of Community Development.

== Political career ==
In 2010, Benjamin joined the United National Congress (UNC) and became a community activist with the party after being inspired by UNC leader Kamla Persad-Bissessar. She was elected as a councillor for the local government district of Hindustan/St. Mary’s in 2016, a position that she was re-elected to in 2019. Since 2017, she has served as the chair of the Moruga/Tableland UNC Executive. She is the current public relations officer for the St Mary’s Village Council.

Benjamin was elected to the House of Representatives on 10 August 2020, following the 2020 general election where she ran as the UNC candidate for the constituency of Moruga/Tableland.

She was re-elected in the 2025 Trinidad and Tobago general election. She was appointed Minister of Culture and Community Development by Prime Minister Kamla Persad-Bissessar.

== Personal life ==
Benjamin is a Baptist.

== Electoral history ==
2025 Trinidad and Tobago general election: Moruga/Tableland
Party	Candidate	Votes	%	±%
UNC	Michelle Benjamin	11,083	57.0%	▲4.5
PNM	Lisa Atwater	7,983	41.1%	▼6.0
PF	Trivet Phillip	281	1.4%	Steady
Majority		3,100	15.9%	
Turnout		19,448	65.38%	
Registered electors		29,744		
UNC hold		Swing	%	
