= Colin Neil Gosine =

Trinidad and Tobago politician

The Honourable Colin Neil Gosine MP

MP for Chaguanas West
- Incumbent
- Assumed office 3 May 2025
- Preceded by: Dinesh Rambally

Member of the Senate
- In office 23 January 2024 – 25 June 2024

Personal details
- Party: UNC

Colin Neil Gosine is a Trinidad and Tobago politician from the United National Congress (UNC). He has been MP for Chaguanas West in the House of Representatives since 2025. He succeeded Dinesh Rambally. Previously he was director of the National Petroleum Marketing Company.

On 3 May 2025 he was appointed Parliamentary Secretary in the Ministry of Trade, Investment and Tourism by Prime Minister Kamla Persad-Bissessar.

== Electoral history ==
2025 Trinidad and Tobago general election: Chaguanas West
Party	Candidate	Votes	%	±%
UNC	Colin Neil Gosine	16,013	88.7%	▲
PNM	Winston Mahabir	1,390	7.7%	▼
PF	Marsha George	599	3.3%	Steady
Majority		14,623	81.0%	
Turnout		18,046	62.14%	
Registered electors		29,043		
UNC hold				

== See also ==
- 13th Republican Parliament of Trinidad and Tobago
