= Errol Fabien =

Errol Fabien is a television and radio presenter from Trinidad and Tobago.

== Early life ==
Fabien was born in Gonzales Village, Guapo, Point Fortin in 1960 to Gloria and Andrew Fabien. Errol, one of nine children, attended Guapo Government School, where his father was vice principal.

He subsequently attended Naparima College for secondary schooling and it was here that he discovered his passion for acting. He became involved in the theater at school where he participated in the secondary school's drama festival.

In 1978, Fabien joined the West Indian Theatre Company and was introduced to the world of comedy. Fabien stayed with the West Indian Theater Company until 1982, when he began freelancing as an actor. Errol is known for his theater performances in Monster March, Seasons, Beef no Chicken, The Fantastic's, Ti Jean and Mariquite, Smile Orange, Adult Suffrage, School's Out and Accidental Death of an Anarchist, to name a few. He is perhaps also lesser known for his film roles in Flight of the Ibis and Secrets of the Shell.

== Theater career ==
Over the past 25 years, Errol has been involved in many aspects of the performing arts. He is an Actor, Presenter, Writer, Producer, M.C., Comedian and Director for stage, radio and television. Errol, along with his brother Nigel (also a Comedian and M.C.), were the jesters for Courts Furniture Stores and appeared together in many ads and promotions for the furniture chain. Fabien has appeared in over 40 plays and has worked with most of the corporate bodies in Trinidad and Tobago. He has also demonstrated his amazing versatility as a performer by entering the calypso arena. In doing so, in 1999 he received the "Best New Male Artist" award at the Sunshine Awards in Manhattan, for his composition Ato Tea Party.

Fabien has also made a name for himself by writing and producing revues in Trinidad and Tobago in a way that locals could relate to. These include The Young and the Restless, The Oprah Winfrey Show, The Michael Jackson Scandal, Tarzan and Jane, In Parliament, Elections 95, The Bold and the Boldface and The Bill Clinton Scandal.

He served as president of the National Drama Association of Trinidad and Tobago from 1994 to 1999.

During the Trinidad and Tobago Carnival 2000 season, Errol co-pioneered the first ever humorous calypso tent, Yangatang, which later became Maljo Kaiso.

== Career in Radio and Television ==
For over twenty years, Errol was a host to a morning drive-time radio talk show program Mixed Nuts on Trinidadian radio station The Vibe CT 105FM. His then co-host, George Gonzales, would later go on to share the spotlight with him on a live television comedy show, Sunset Strip. He was dismissed from radio in 2015 for contesting a government election.

In February 2004, Errol teamed up with Banyan Ltd and started Trinidad's first Community Television Station, “Gayelle the Channel”. Today he is the co-founder, chairman and CEO of this innovative television initiative.

Errol is also a recovering drug addict, who embraced recovery in March 1988 and has today remained completely drug-free for over 30 years. Errol also talks to youths and other recovering addicts across Trinidad and Tobago on a regular basis about his experiences while he was an active Drug Addict.

== Career in politics ==
Fabian ran as an independent candidate for the St. Joseph constituency (renamed Aranguez/St Joseph in 2025) in the 2015 and 2020 general elections. He was the National Transformation Alliance for Point Fortin in 2025.

== Electoral history ==
2025 Trinidad and Tobago general election: Point Fortin
Party	Candidate	Votes	%	±%
UNC	Ernesto Kesar	7,293	51.5%	▲
PNM	Kennedy Richards	6,509	46.0%	▼
NTA	Errol Fabien	203	1.4%	Steady
All People's Party (Trinidad and Tobago)	Sheldon Khan	81	0.6%	Steady
Majority		784	5.5%	
Turnout		14,151	53.46%	
Registered electors		26,470		
UNC gain from PNM		Swing	%	
