= Dinesh Rambally =

Trinidad and Tobago politician

Pandit Dinesh Rambally

Member of Parliament for Chaguanas West
- In office 19 August 2020 – 18 March 2025
- Preceded by: Ganga Singh
- Succeeded by: Colin Neil Gosine

Personal details
- Party: United National Congress

Pandit Dinesh Rambally is a Trinidadian and Tobagonian politician, attorney, and Hindu priest from the United National Congress and an executive member of the Sanatan Dharma Maha Sabha. He represented Chaguanas West in the House of Representatives from 2020 until 2025. He is of Indo-Trinidadian descent. He intended to stand again at the 2025 Trinidad and Tobago general election. He later withdrew his candidacy. He was highly critical of his party leader Kamla Persad-Bissessar. He cited "divisive racial rhetoric" in his party for his decision. He endorsed the People's National Movement (PNM) of Stuart Young.

== See also ==
- 12th Republican Parliament of Trinidad and Tobago
