= Stephen Cadiz =

Trinidad and Tobago politician, businessman, activist

The Hon. Stephen Cadiz is a politician in Trinidad and Tobago. A member of parliament for Chaguanas East, he assumed the portfolio of Minister of Trade and Industry on Wednesday 2 June 2010. A prominent businessman and social activist, Minister Cadiz headed the Ministry responsible for the country's diversification drive, i.e. developing the non-energy services and manufacturing sectors to achieve long-term sustainable economic growth. After the PNM won the general election in 2015, Cadiz returned to private life.

== Early life ==
Minister Cadiz is of French and Spanish heritage and is originally from Arima, the largest town in the Eastern part of Trinidad. In 1987 in the midst of a severe recession, he started Tropical Power Limited in Edinburgh Village, Chaguanas. Based on his own knowledge of the power generation services industry, Minister Cadiz grew his company from a locally based entity into a regional organization that specializes in the sale, rental and service of commercial and industrial generators.

Minister Cadiz first came to prominence in Trinidad and Tobago through his social activism in mid-2005. However, he had already been involved in various citizens' groups and in particular environmental causes, for a number of years. Following the murder of his employee, Keith Noel, and angered by the rising crime rate and the apparent indifference of the authorities to the deteriorating social situation, Minister Cadiz formed the Keith Noel 136 Committee. The 136 was Keith's victim number. The committee organised a number of large social activities, including gathering in excess of 127,000 signatures on a petition asking for the president of the Republic to intervene and get the government to make positive moves in dealing with a runaway crime situation. On October 24 the committee staged the famous Death March against crime in 2005. Over 15,000 persons attended the March. Later on, the committee organised the first-ever referendum in the country, mailing out over 930,000 ballots to the electorate.

Realising that civic activism was not having the desired effect, Minister Cadiz decided to enter the political arena, in order to affect the change he believed was necessary for the country to move forward. In his first foray into politics he represented Chaguanas East as a member of the United National Congress (UNC) of the People's Partnership, and after their victory at the polls on 24 May 2010, was sworn in as a minister in the Government of Trinidad and Tobago on Friday 28 May 2010. His first appointment was as the Minister of Trade and Industry with subsequent appointments as the Minister of Tourism and then Minister of Transport.

After the UNC lost the general election in 2015, Cadiz returned to his business, where he is still active as of today.
