= Herbert Volney =

Trinidad and Tobago politician (1953–2022)

Herbert Volney (8 June 1953 – 7 December 2022) was a politician from Trinidad and Tobago, who was a member of the United National Congress (UNC) party. He served as Minister of Justice and Member of Parliament for St. Joseph/Maracas, Trinidad and Tobago.

== Career ==
After graduating in 1976 with a Bachelor of Law degree, Volney was admitted to the Hugh Wooding Law School and was called to the Bar of Trinidad and Tobago as a barrister in 1978. In 1979, he was recruited by then Attorney General Selwyn Richardson to work in the office of the Director of Public Prosecutions where he served for ten years. He retired as Assistant Director of Public Prosecutions. In 1994 he was recruited by Chief Justice Clinton Bernard and appointed a judge of the Supreme Court. By the time of his retirement to stand for the constituency of St Joseph in the 2010 Trinidad and Tobago general election, he had presided over 400 trials at the higher level and had worked extensively in the Port of Spain, San Fernando and Scarborough sittings of the Criminal Assizes. Volney was the Head boy of his alma mater St Mary's Academy and President of the Guild of Undergraduates at Cave Hill Campus of the University of West Indies.

Between 1994 and 2010, Volney was a judge of the Supreme Court of Trinidad and Tobago. Volney was a member of parliament, and he became Justice Minister in Kamla Persad-Bissessar's cabinet.

While Justice Minister, Volney met Venezuelan Ambassador Maria Eugenia Marcano Casado to begin discussions about potential cooperation on penal reform, offender management and other criminal justice issues. He also met Sir Edward Garnier who retired from politics in the 2017 General Election in the United Kingdom. As Justice Minister he was somewhat controversial, making headlines through unfortunate comments and by proposing that prisoners be allowed conjugal visits at a time when supposed rising crime rates prompted the citizenry to punish prisoners more severely. He was dismissed in September 2012, being one of eleven ministers who were fired by the former government, including his successor at the Ministry of Justice Christlyn Moore, before the leading party lost the September 2015 General Elections. He was criticized at the time by Persad-Bissessar for having allegedly misled the Cabinet over the early proclamation of Section 34 of the Administration of Justice (Indictable Offences) Act; however, British Queen's Counsel Edward Fitzgerald argued during a hearing in the High Court in January 2013 that Volney did not mislead his Cabinet colleagues. He appeared with Persad-Bissessar at a public UNC event in May 2013.

== Death ==
Volney died on 7 December 2022, at the age of 69.
