= Sean Sobers =

Trinidad and Tobago politician

The Honourable Sean Sobers MP
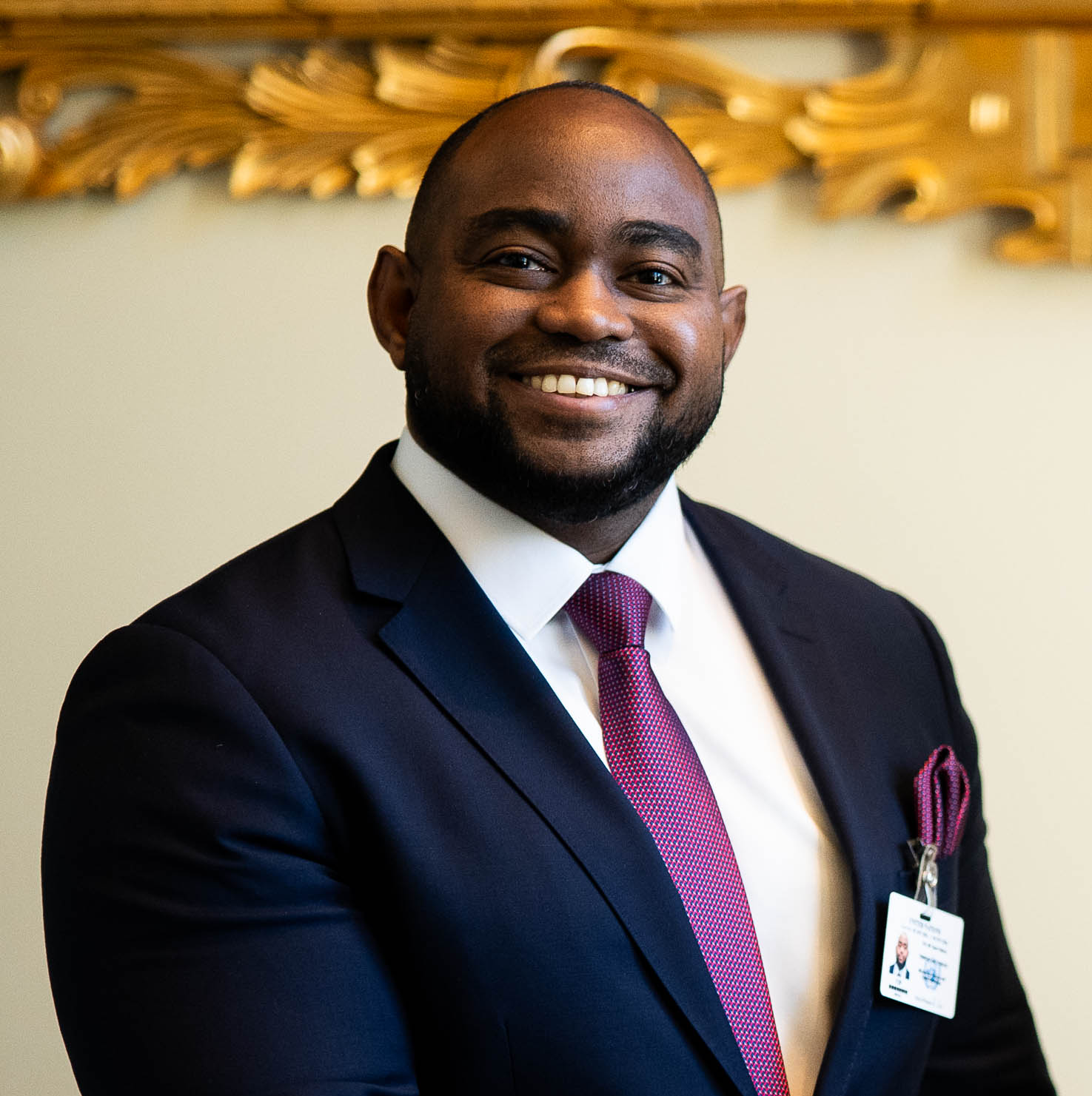

Member of Parliament for Tabaquite
- Incumbent
- Assumed office 3 May 2025
- Preceded by: Anita Haynes

Minister of Foreign and CARICOM Affairs
- Incumbent
- Assumed office 1 May 2025
- Prime Minister: Kamla Persad-Bissessar
- Preceded by: Amery Browne

Opposition Senator
- In office 14 March 2017 – 9 August 2020
- In office 11 January 2022 – 26 January 2022

Personal details
- Born: 16 October 1988 (age 37)
- Party: United National Congress (UNC)
- Education: Presentation College San Fernando

Sean Sobers is a Trinidad and Tobago politician. He has been the United National Congress (UNC) member of parliament representing the Tabaquite parliamentary constituency since 2025. He currently serves as Minister of Foreign and Caricom Affairs.

== Career ==
Sobers served as a senator for the UNC. In the 2020 Trinidad and Tobago general election, he was the UNC candidate in San Fernando West.

In the 2025 Trinidad and Tobago general election, he was elected in Tabaquite. On 3 May 2025 he was appointed Minister of Foreign and Caricom Affairs in the second Persad-Bissessar administration.

== Electoral history ==
2025 Trinidad and Tobago general election: Tabaquite
Party	Candidate	Votes	%	±%
UNC	Sean Sobers	11,615	73.7%	▲
PNM	Marisha Alvarado	3,436	21.8%	▼
PF	Amzad Mohammed	668	4.2%	Steady
Majority		8,179	51.9%	
Turnout		15,765	54.6%	
Registered electors		28,876		
UNC hold		Swing	%	

== See also ==
- 13th Republican Parliament of Trinidad and Tobago
