= Movement for Social Justice =

- Leader: David Abdulah
- Chairperson: Gregory Fernandez
- Founded: March 2009
- Registered: April 2010
- Headquarters: San Fernando, Trinidad and Tobago
- Ideology: Socialism; Labourism; Direct democracy
- Political position: Left-wing
- Regional affiliation: São Paulo Forum
- Colors: Sky blue
- House of Representatives: 0 / 41
- Local districts: 0 / 136
- Local municipalities: 0 / 14

Website
- www.msjtnt.org

The Movement for Social Justice (MSJ) is a socialist political party in Trinidad and Tobago founded in March 2009. Its logo is the Scales of Justice. Its current leader is David Abdulah, a former government senator and general secretary of the Oilfields Workers' Trade Union.

The MSJ party was part of the People's Partnership alliance for the 2010 general elections, but did not contest under its own name and has since parted ways with the PP. The party held its Founding Congress on May 14, 2011.

In October 2012 the MSJ launched a think-tank called the Foundation for Social Justice, which aims to promote ideals of social justice, equity and participatory democracy through seminars, research, publication, advocacy and campaigns.
