= Congress of the People (Trinidad and Tobago) =

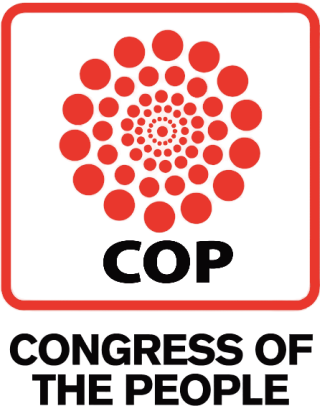
- Leader: Prakash Ramadhar
- Chairman: Lonsdale Williams
- Founder: Winston Dookeran
- Founded: 10 September 2006
- Split from: United National Congress
- Headquarters: Res Integra Building, 151 A Southern Main Road, Edinburgh, Chaguanas, Trinidad and Tobago
- Youth wing: Youth Congress
- Ideology: Reformism
- Political position: Centre-left
- Colors: Red, white, and black
- House of Representatives: 0 / 41
- Regional municipalities: 0 / 139
- Regional corporations: 0 / 14

Election symbol
- Circle of Circles

Website
- coptt.org

The Congress of the People (COP) is a political party in Trinidad and Tobago. Its current political leader is Prakash Ramadhar. Its symbol is the "Circle of Circles".

== History ==
The party was formed on 10 September 2006 by Winston Dookeran, then the embattled Political Leader of the United National Congress announced at a rally that he was leaving the UNC and forming a new party. Dookeran and his supporters had been engaged in internal party feuding with the UNC executive which was loyal to party founder (then chairman and former Leader) Basdeo Panday.

Dookeran was soon joined by UNC MPs Ganga Singh (who became the Party Whip) and Manohar Ramsaran. Two Independent MPs who had previously left the UNC, Gillian Lucky and Gerald Yetming, also joined the new party.

Former UNC Senators Robin Montano, Roy Augustus, Carolyn Seepersad-Bachan and Sadiq Baksh also joined. Additionally, the entire Constituency Executives for Chaguanas and San Fernando West also quit the UNC. The support for Dookeran served as the catalyst for the formation of the new movement.

After the internal elections of the United National Congress Dookeran, accompanied by then-Senator Sadiq Baksh, began meeting with the members and supporters of the UNC. It was during these meetings that many got involved with Dookeran's campaign and he began working the Tabaquite Constituency promoting the concept of New Politics. Hundreds of supporters working with grass-roots members of the Tabaquite Constituency worked to develop a strategic plan document which detailed numerous strategies to address the social and economic needs of the people of the constituency. This plan was submitted to Dookeran, who later adopted its recommendations and suggested that similar plans be developed for all 41 Constituencies.

On a Morning Edition program in November 2005, a supporter of Dookeran announced that the members and supporters of the Tabaquite UNC Party Group # 3255 had thrown their support behind Dookeran and called on then Member of Parliament Dr. Adesh Nanan to support the duly elected Political Leader of the UNC.

This was the beginning of the work that led to the groundswell of support for the UNC Political Leader and later became the strongest support base for Dookeran and the New Politics.

On 23 July 2006 a supporter interrupted the proceeding at the Hindu Credit Union Convention Center and read aloud what later became known as the Freeport Declaration, calling on Dookeran to leave the UNC and follow the desire of the thousands gathered there toward the formation of a "New Political Vehicle."

== Dookeran's New Politics ==
The Philosophy of New Politics was a concept that stemmed from opposition to Basdeo Panday stating his philosophy that 'Politics has a Morality of its own'. The 'New Politics' sought to uphold good governance and integrity as principles of political behaviour. The constituency of Tabaquite was considered 'ground zero' during the 2007 Parliamentary Elections. The COP managed to field the popular newspaper columnist and high-profile Attorney Anand Ramlogan as Candidate for the COP in that race. He was among a field of impressive former UNC and NAR politicians along with several new faces.

In the 2007 General Elections, the COP had built momentum and at one stage, after holding a massive rally in Woodford Square, Port of Spain, had many analysts predicting an upset at the polls. The UNC however managed to make a comeback by campaigning on the basis that the COP would 'split the vote' allowing the PNM to regain power. After the election it was revealed, the COP had gained the highest ever votes by a third party in Trinidad and Tobago history. The Party won no Seats in Parliament but made impressive tallies in the East-West Corridor and Diego Martin areas.

The UNC held 15 seats in its South and Central base but blamed the COP for the loss of several marginal seats handing the PNM a wider victory. The COP continued to exist doing community work and leading various campaigns and discussions. The COP had been openly approaching Kamla Persad-Bissessar to join its party and she eventually was the first member of the UNC to attend a COP convention.

The PNM had a large majority but faced with mounting allegations of corruption, Prime Minister Patrick Manning called a snap election in 2010, more than two years before it was due. The COP entered into a pact called the 'Fyzabad Declaration' where Kamla Persad-Bissessar who had recently been elected Political Leader of the UNC, would lead an electoral arrangement of several interest groups to the polls. In the parliamentary elections held on 24 May 2010, the party joined forces with four other political parties, including the UNC, to form the People's Partnership. On May 24 2010, the People's Partnership won the election convincingly. The UNC won 21 seats, COP won 6 seats and TOP won 2 seats and PNM just 12 seats.

Chairman of the COP, Joseph Toney took on the role of watchdog as the COP sought to distinguish itself from the UNC even while part of the governing coalition. The COP made public its uneasiness with issues concerning Jack Warner and its share of local government and state board appointments. Winston Dookeran, then Minister of Finance, stepped down before party leadership elections in 2011 where Prakash Ramadhar defeated Anil Roberts and Vernon De Lima to succeed Dookeran as the Political Leader of COP.

== Turbulent Tenure ==
Under the Leadership of Prakash Ramadhar, the COP saw many internal conflicts as the party became divided on its continued participation in the coalition with the United National Congress. The majority of COP supporters becoming disenchanted clamoring for Ramadhar's resignation and for the COP to leave the People's Partnership Government. Leading this charge were three dissident members: the Political Leader's brother Kishore Ramadhar, the party's chairman in Diego Martin West Rudolph Hanamji, and the former chairman Satu-Ann Ramcharan. They were suspended from the party with Political Leader Prakash Ramadhar accusing the dissidents of betraying the party. This action has subsequently resulted in a high court action taken by Ramadhar, Ramcharan and Hanamji in which Prakash Ramadhar, the chairman Carolyn Seepersad- Bachan, together with three others of the membership have been found liable of defaming the three dissidents. The High Court found that the debacle is a case of good politics gone awry and further condemned Prakash Ramadhar as a clear case of the Political Leader using his power to bolster his position and the relationship with the People's Partnership government to the detriment of the reputation of the dissidents. "Far from a legitimate reply to an attack of his leadership, it was a collateral and un-related attack on the claimants with the intention of bolstering his position as leader of the party and the direction of the party at the expense of the claimants reputation. His attack can be characterized as a disproportionate response designed to destroy his opponents and silence his detractors." Prakash Ramadhar and co-defendants were ordered to pay $255,000 in compensation but only Ramadhar decided to have the matter appealed.

The rift between the COP hierarchy and its membership continued to widen resulting in an overall decline in party attractiveness and mass defections during the general election campaign of 2015.

== 2015 General Elections Fallout ==
The COP remained as a partner party within the People's Partnership coalition which contested the 2015 general elections in Trinidad & Tobago held on 7 September 2015. The COP contested eight (8) seats; however, the Partnership government lost the election with all COP candidates being defeated at the polls save and except the UNC stronghold constituency of St. Augustine, which was held by its political leader, Prakash Ramadhar. The COP together with the United National Congress (UNC) went on to form the Opposition of Trinidad & Tobago.

With continued fallout from the election defeat and the judgement of the high court, Ramadhar resigned as political leader in February 2016, a year before his term of office ended. Anirudh Mahabir acted as political leader and was elected unopposed to the position in July 2016. In 2017, former deputy political leader and one of the founding members of the COP, Carolyn Seepersad-Bachan was elected as the new political leader of the COP.

Also in 2017, the Court of Appeal dismissed Ramadhar's appeal grounds thus reinforcing the High Court's ruling. Ramadhar again appealed to the Privy Council, the final appellate court. In February 2020, the Privy Council ruled in favor of Ramadhar overturning the judgements of both the High Court and Court of Appeal. The Privy Council stated that "given in particular the practical reality that Mr. Prakash Ramadhar had to tell the public at the press conference what had happened at the National Council meeting on that day, the reasonable parameters of political debate were not exceeded."

== 2020 General Elections ==
While the legal challenges and in-fighting among members took its toll on the party, the decline of the COP continued under the leadership of Carolyn Seepersad-Bachan. Some members began questioning her mandate as official results of the 2017 internal elections showed that only 589 of the 40,000 members voted with Seepersad-Bachan winning 416 votes. The party failed to reinvigorate and woo new members leading up to the 2020 General Elections that were held on 10 August 2020.

In April 2020, the COP formed an alliance called the "Better United" coalition with much smaller parties; Democratic Party of T&T (DPTT), New National Vision (NNV), Trinidad & Tobago Democratic Front (TTDF), Port of Spain People's Movement (PPM), and independent candidate Errol Fabien. The NNV was removed from the coalition as the political leader, Fuad Abu Bakr sought to become a candidate for the incumbent People's National Movement. Not long after, the TTDF parted ways with the coalition citing differences in values and views.

In the general elections, the remaining members of the coalition except the PPM contested six (6) seats; COP - 4, DPTT - 1, and Independent (Fabien) - 1. However, all candidates were resoundingly defeated in the polls including the political leader of the COP who contested the St. Augustine seat. Not only the COP lost their lone seat of St. Augustine, the coalition only gathered a total of 721 votes (COP - 467, DPTT - 37 and Independent - 217) out of a voter turnout of 658,297. The defeat also meant the COP lost their position as the political "third force" to the Tobago-based Progressive Democratic Patriots (PDP).

A day after the general elections, Carolyn Seepersad-Bachan stepped down as political leader. Upon her departure, Kirt Sinnette, former national boxer and Olympian acted as interim political leader.

== Ramadhar's Return & General Elections 2025 ==
Following the resignation of party leader Kirt Sinnette in December 2024, former political leader Prakash Ramadhar returned to the party leadership in an interim capacity. Ramadhar's interim return and confirmation as Political Leader were reported following his election by the party's National Council at a National Council (NATCO) meeting held at the Centre of Excellence, Macoya in January 2025.

Following the leadership confirmation, the Congress of the People announced the appointment of an interim executive, which included Imran Ali as Deputy Political Leader.

In advance of the 2025 general election, the Congress of the People entered into an electoral arrangement with the United National Congress as part of the Coalition of Interests. Under this arrangement, the party contested two constituencies: Port of Spain South, with Kirt Sinnette as the party's candidate, and St Ann's West, with Gerrard Small as the party's candidate. Both candidates were unsuccessful in their respective constituencies.

Subsequent to the election, Sinnette was appointed Chairman of the Trinidad and Tobago Boxing Board of Control, while Small was appointed a director on the board of the Trinidad and Tobago Electricity Commission.

Party officials have indicated that the Congress of the People intends to continue organizational rebuilding efforts and to contest the next local government elections, constitutionally due in 2027. They are standing two candidates in the 2025 Trinidad and Tobago general election.
