= People's Partnership =

- Abbreviation: PP
- Leader: Kamla Persad-Bissessar
- Founder: Kamla Persad-Bissesar
- Founded: April 21, 2010
- Dissolved: December 8, 2015
- Merged into: UNC, COP, TOP, MSJ and NJAC
- Headquarters: Couva, Couva–Tabaquite–Talparo, Trinidad and Tobago
- Newspaper: The Voice
- Ideology: Social democracy Third Way; Multiculturalism
- Political position: Centre-left
- Colors: Yellow

Website
- http://peoplespartnership.unitednationalcongress.org

The People's Partnership (PP) was a political coalition in Trinidad and Tobago among five political parties: the United National Congress (UNC), the Congress of the People (COP), the Tobago Organization of the People (TOP), Movement for Social Justice (MSJ) and National Joint Action Committee (NJAC). The political leader was Kamla Persad-Bissessar. The coalition was formed in advance of the 2010 general election attempting to form a multi-ethnic opposition bloc against the People's National Movement (PNM) government led by Patrick Manning. The coalition won the 2010 General Elections defeating the People's National Movement on May 24, 2010. On September 7, 2015, the coalition was defeated in the 2015 General Elections to the People's National Movement led by Keith Rowley. The coalition saw the departure of the Movement for Social Justice in 2012 and eventually disbanded on December 8, 2015.

== Formation ==
On January 24, 2010, Kamla Persad-Bissessar was elected political leader of the UNC, emerging victorious over the party's founder, Basdeo Panday. She was formally appointed opposition leader on February 25, 2010.

On April 21, 2010, at Charlie King Junction, Fyzabad, a "Unity Accord" also known as the "Fyzabad Declaration" was signed by the UNC political leader, Kamla Persad-Bissessar, COP political leader Winston Dookeran, NJAC chief servant Makandal Daaga, TOP political leader Ashworth Jack, and president of the Movement for Social Justice, Errol McLeod.

On May 24, 2010, the People's Partnership led by Kamla Persad-Bissessar defeated the People's National Movement by securing 29 out of 41 seats in the House of Representatives. Persad-Bissessar was sworn in as the first female prime minister by President George Maxwell Richards, where Anand Ramlogan was sworn in as Attorney General on May 26, 2010. Shortly thereafter, the People's Partnership won the 2010 local elections on July 26, 2010, securing a majority in the local corporations.

== Turbulence ==
On June 17, 2012, the Movement for Social Justice severed ties with the coalition citing poor governance.

On January 21, 2013, the Tobago Organization of the People, lost all 12 electoral seats in the Tobago House of Assembly (THA) elections to the People's National Movement.

On April 21, 2013, one of the coalition's financiers, Minister of National Security, and Chairman of the United National Congress, Jack Warner resigned two days after an investigation accused him and his one-time ally Chuck Blazer of "fraudulent" management at Concacaf, a regional football confederation. His resignation triggered a by-election in the Chaguanas-West constituency which he won three months later on July 29, 2013, under his newly formed Independent Liberal Party.

On July 30, 2013, Member of Parliament for St. Joseph, Herbert Volney resigned as Minister of Justice and the UNC party due to the "Section 34" fallout. His resignation also triggered a by-election in the St. Joseph constituency which was lost to the People's National Movement on November 4, 2013.

The People's Partnership also lost the Local Government Elections on October 25, 2013, to the People's National Movement. This meant that the coalition lost a total of four successive elections in one year.

Allegations were also raised on May 20, 2013, known as the "Emailgate" scandal regarding a criminal conspiracy in September 2012 against Director of Public Prosecutions Roger Gaspard, as well as a plot to harm and discredit a newspaper reporter Denyse Renne, and the payment of monies in exchange for freedom by an unnamed person.

Then Opposition leader, Dr Rowley read a thread of 31 email messages in the Parliament purporting to be a conversation between four people, whose email accounts were similar to those of the then Prime Minister Kamla Persad-Bissessar, Attorney General Anand Ramlogan, National Security advisor Gary Griffith, and Works and Infrastructure Minister Suruj Rambachan. Six years later on July 17, 2019, the police investigation into the case has been officially closed with no charges being laid.

== Electoral defeat ==
In the 2015 general election, the People's Partnership Government was defeated by the People's National Movement only winning 18 of the 41 seats; 17 were won by the United National Congress, and 1 by the severely weakened Congress of the People. The remaining coalition partners, the Tobago Organization of the People and the National Joint Action Committee failed to win a seat and have quietly departed from the coalition party. Persad-Bissessar was appointed Leader of the Opposition by President Anthony Carmona on September 21, 2015, to form the UNC led Opposition party in the 11th Parliament of Trinidad and Tobago.
