= Surujrattan Rambachan =

Trinidad and Tobago politician, academic and cultural activist

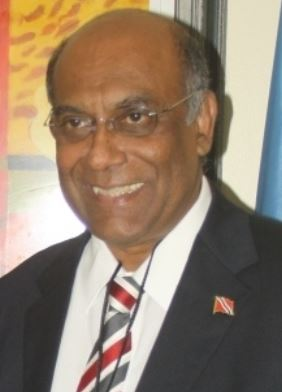
Rambachan in 2012

Surujrattan Rambachan (born April 14, 1949) is a Trinidad and Tobago politician, academic and cultural activist. He was the Works and Infrastructure Minister of Trinidad and Tobago and deputy political leader of the United National Congress Party (UNC) and member of parliament for Tabaquite.

== Political career ==
He previously served as mayor of Chaguanas, Senator and Minister in the Ministry of Industry and Tourism and Ambassador to Brazil. In 1980 he was a founding member of the Organisation for National Reconstruction and served as Deputy Political Leader of that party. He played a key role in the establishment of Indian Arrival Day as a national celebration in Trinidad and Tobago. He was the Minister of Foreign Affairs and a Member of Parliament for the constituency of Tabaquite.

Rambachan received his instrument of appointment from George Maxwell Richards, President of the Republic of Trinidad and Tobago on Friday 28 May 2010 after taking the oath of office. Minister Rambachan is an experienced diplomat who served as Ambassador to Brazil during the period 1987 to 1990.

He has had a long-standing career in public life and became a founding member of the Organisation for National Reconstruction in 1980 where he served as Deputy Political Leader of the party. In April 1990 he was appointed as Senator and Minister in the Ministry of Industry, Enterprise and Tourism. He also held the position of Mayor of Chaguanas for six years during the period 2003 to 2009. Rambachan has served as a lecturer with the University of the West Indies, St Augustine Campus.

Rambachan sued Jack Warner for defamation as a result of remarks the latter made at a July 2013 meeting of the Independent Liberal Party. The suit was settled in favor of Rambachan for TT$375,000 in July 2016.

== 2015 accusations against Inshan Ishmael ==
In August 2015, Suruj Rambachan publicly accused the owner of the IBN, Inshan Ishmael of targeting him and his family.
