= 12th Republican Parliament of Trinidad and Tobago =

←	11th	13th	→

Overview
- Legislative body: Parliament of Trinidad and Tobago
- Jurisdiction: Trinidad and Tobago
- Term: 19 August 2020 – 18 March 2025
- Election: 2020 Trinidad and Tobago general election
- Government: PNM (22)
- Opposition: UNC (19)
- Members: 41

The members of the House of Representatives Trinidad and Tobago in the 12th Republican Parliament (2020-2025) are listed below based on the results of the 2020 general election:

== Members ==
Constituency		Party	Member of Parliament	Notes
1	Arima	PNM	Pennelope Beckles	
2	Arouca/Maloney	PNM	Camille Robinson-Regis	Leader of Government Business the House
3	Barataria/San Juan	UNC	Saddam Hosein	
4	Caroni Central	UNC	Arnold Ram	
5	Caroni East	UNC	Rishad Seecheran	
6	Chaguanas East	UNC	Vandana Mohit	
7	Chaguanas West	UNC	Dinesh Rambally	
8	Couva North	UNC	Ravi Ratiram	
9	Couva South	UNC	Rudranath Indarsingh	
10	Cumuto/Manzanilla	UNC	Rai Ragbir	
11	D'Abadie/O'Meara	PNM	Lisa Morris-Julian	
12	Diego Martin Central	PNM	Symon de Nobriga	
13	Diego Martin North/East	PNM	Colm Imbert	
14	Diego Martin West	PNM	Keith Rowley	Prime Minister (2020–2025)
15	Fyzabad	UNC	Lackram Bodoe	
16	La Brea	PNM	Stephen McClashie	
17	La Horquetta/Talparo	PNM	Foster Cummings	
18	Laventille East/Morvant	PNM	Adrian Leonce	
19	Laventille West	PNM	Fitzgerald Hinds	
20	Lopinot/Bon Air West	PNM	Marvin Gonzales	
21	Mayaro	UNC	Rushton Paray	
22	Naparima	UNC	Rodney Charles	
23	Oropouche East	UNC	Roodal Moonilal	
24	Oropouche West	UNC	Davendranath Tancoo	
25	Point Fortin	PNM	Kennedy Richards	
26	Pointe-à-Pierre	UNC	David Lee	Opposition Chief Whip
27	Port of Spain North/St. Ann's West	PNM	Stuart Young	Prime Minister (2025)
28	Port of Spain South	PNM	Keith Scotland	
29	Princes Town	UNC	Barry Padarath	
30	Moruga/Tableland	UNC	Michelle Benjamin	
31	San Fernando East	PNM	Brian Manning	
32	San Fernando West	PNM	Faris Al Rawi	
33	Siparia	UNC	Kamla Persad-Bissessar	Leader of the Opposition
34	St. Ann's East	PNM	Nyan Gadsby-Dolly	
35	St. Augustine	UNC	Khadijah Ameen	
36	St. Joseph	PNM	Terrence Deyalsingh	
37	Tabaquite	UNC	Anita Haynes	
38	Tobago East	PNM	Ayanna Webster-Roy	
39	Tobago West	PNM	Shamfa Cudjoe	
40	Toco/Sangre Grande	PNM	Roger Monroe	
41	Tunapuna	PNM	Esmond Forde	Deputy Speaker of the House
