= 2022 United National Congress leadership election =

Party election in Trinidad and Tobago

- 26 June 2022
- Turnout: 12,201
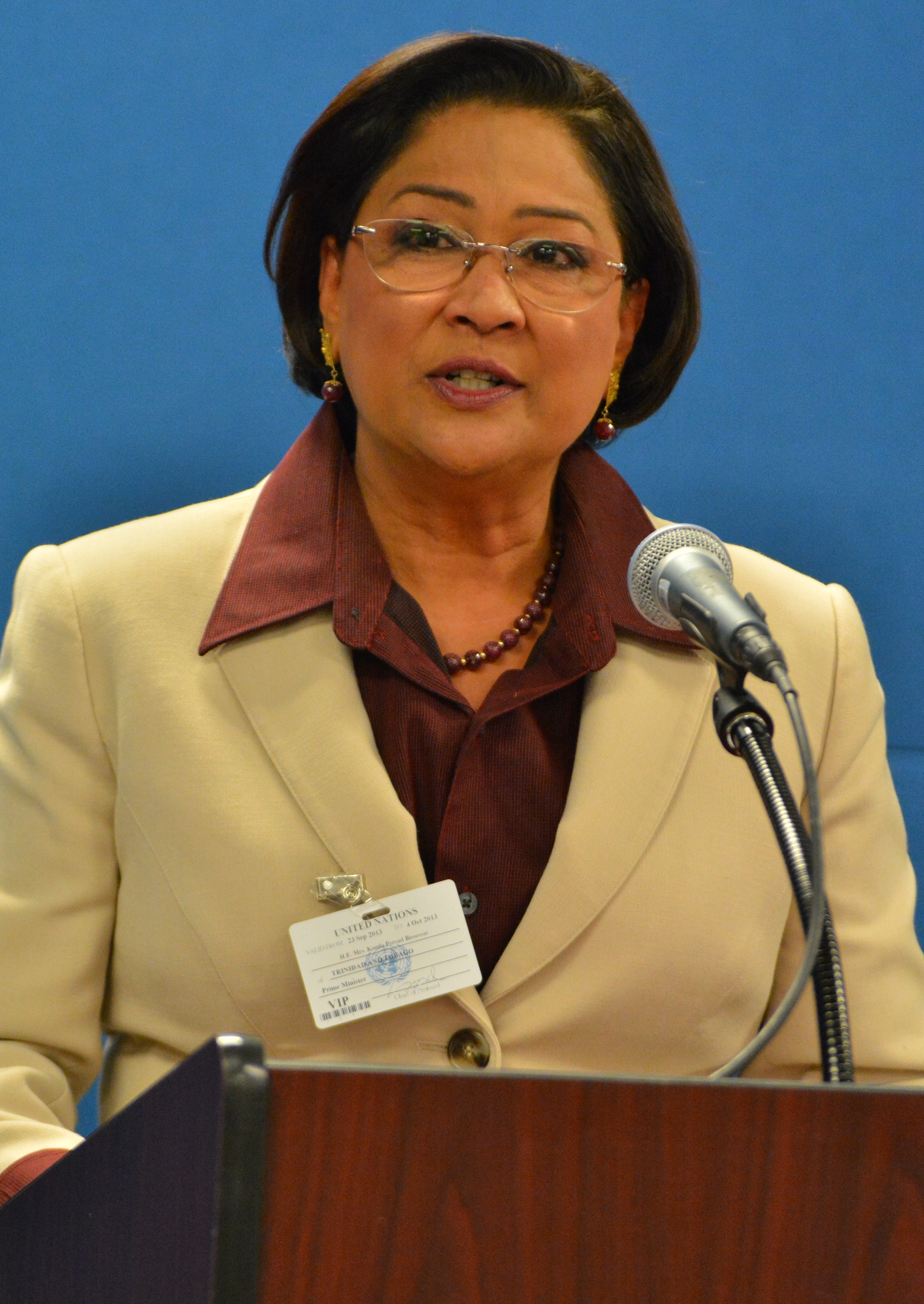

Candidate	Kamla Persad-Bissessar	Fuad Khan
Popular vote	11,554 votes ▼3,319 votes	647 votes ▲647 votes
Percentage	94.70% ▲7.55 pp	5.30% ▲5.30 pp
Last election	14,873 votes; 87.15%	N/A; Did not contest
Home Constituency	Siparia	Barataria/San Juan
Team	Star	Independent
Symbol		–
Previous Leader
Kamla Persad-Bissessar
Leader
Kamla Persad-Bissessar

The 2022 United National Congress leadership election took place on 26 June 2022. Kamla Persad-Bissessar, political leader of the United National Congress, Leader of the Opposition of Trinidad and Tobago, former Prime Minister, and Member of Parliament for Siparia, went up for re-election with her slate of candidates on the Star Team. The Star Team ran unopposed for all but three three post in the UNC's national executive. These three candidates were independent and were not part of a slate of candidates. Fuad Khan, former Minister of Health in Persad-Bissessar's government and the former Member of Parliament for Barataria/San Juan challenged Persad-Bissessar for the post for political leader of the party. The leadership election was meant to set the stage of the UNC's national executive (NATEX) for the upcoming local elections and to start preparing for the 2025 Trinidad and Tobago general election.

Official results were released on 1 July 2022. Persad-Bissessar won with 94.70% of the votes, receiving 11,554 votes, and Khan received 647 votes at 5.30% of the votes. It was the party's lowest voter turnout, in what is seen as a trend in declining voter turnout in the UNC's recent leadership elections.

== Candidates ==
Bold indicates winner.

Political leader
Team	Candidate
Star	**Kamla Persad-Bissessar**
Independent	Fuad Khan

Deputy political leaders
Team	Candidates
Star	**Roodal Moonilal**, **David A. Lee**, **Jearlean John**

Chairman
Team	Candidate
Star	**Davendranath Tancoo**

Vice Chairman
Team	Candidate
Star	**Khadijah Ameen**

Education Officer
Team	Candidate
Star	**Vandana Mohit**

Research officer
Team	Candidate
Star	**Saddam Hosein**

Elections officer
Team	Candidate
Star	**Don T. Sylvester**
Independent	Ramona Ramdial

Party organizer
Team	Candidate
Star	**Ravi Ratiram**
Independent	Glenn Ramadharsingh

Treasurer
Team	Candidate
Star	**Colin Neil Gosine**

Tobago regional representative
Team	Candidate
Star	**Taharqa Obika**

Policy and strategy coordinator
Team	Candidate
Star	**Sean S.M. Sobers**

International relations officer
Team	Candidate
Star	**Wilfred Nicholas Morris**

South regional representative
Team	Candidate
Star	**Shanty Boodram**

Central regional representative
Team	Candidate
Star	**Barry Padarath**

Northwest regional representative
Team	Candidate
Star	**Eli Zakour**

Northeast regional representative
Team	Candidate
Star	**Anil Roberts**

== Criticism ==
There much held criticism of the leadership election before it was even held. Former candidates for the position of political leader in the last election, Vasant Bharath and Devant Maharaj, both called the election a sham. Maharaj claimed that the election violated the party's constitution. Bharath said he chose not to run against Persad-Bissessar again because he did not want to legitimize what he believed to be a sham process. He also claimed that there was a violation of the party's constitution, as only the party's NATEX was due for election this year and that the office of political leader was due for election in 2023.

On election day there were at least four discrepancies. Independent candidate Glenn Ramadharsingh claimed that in Caroni Central there were poll workers who worked for a candidate's parliamentary office. However, the party's election chairman, Ramesh Persad Maharaj, said that many of the complaints about election irregularities were not valid and that he took Ramadharsingh around the polling stations in Caroni Central asking workers if they were associated with any candidate, to which all responded they were not. Maharaj believed the statements were not substantiated. Fuad Khan said he accepted the results, but would only concede if the elections were fair and free and he claimed that Persad-Bissessar and her Star Team has influenced the results due to having the upper-hand in her incumbency as political leader of the party. Independent candidate for Education Officer, Ramona Ramdial, congratulated Persad-Bissessar, but claimed only about 10,000 members voted, not 13,000, and that persons who were not on the party's membership list were able to vote, and that there was open canvassing and voter intimidation by members of Parliament, councillors and activists on behalf of the Star Team at the voting venues and inside the polling stations. Both Khan and Ramdial pledged their future support for the UNC, but stated not under the current leadership.
