= Lackram Bodoe =

Trinidad and Tobago politician

The Honourable Lackram Bodoe MP
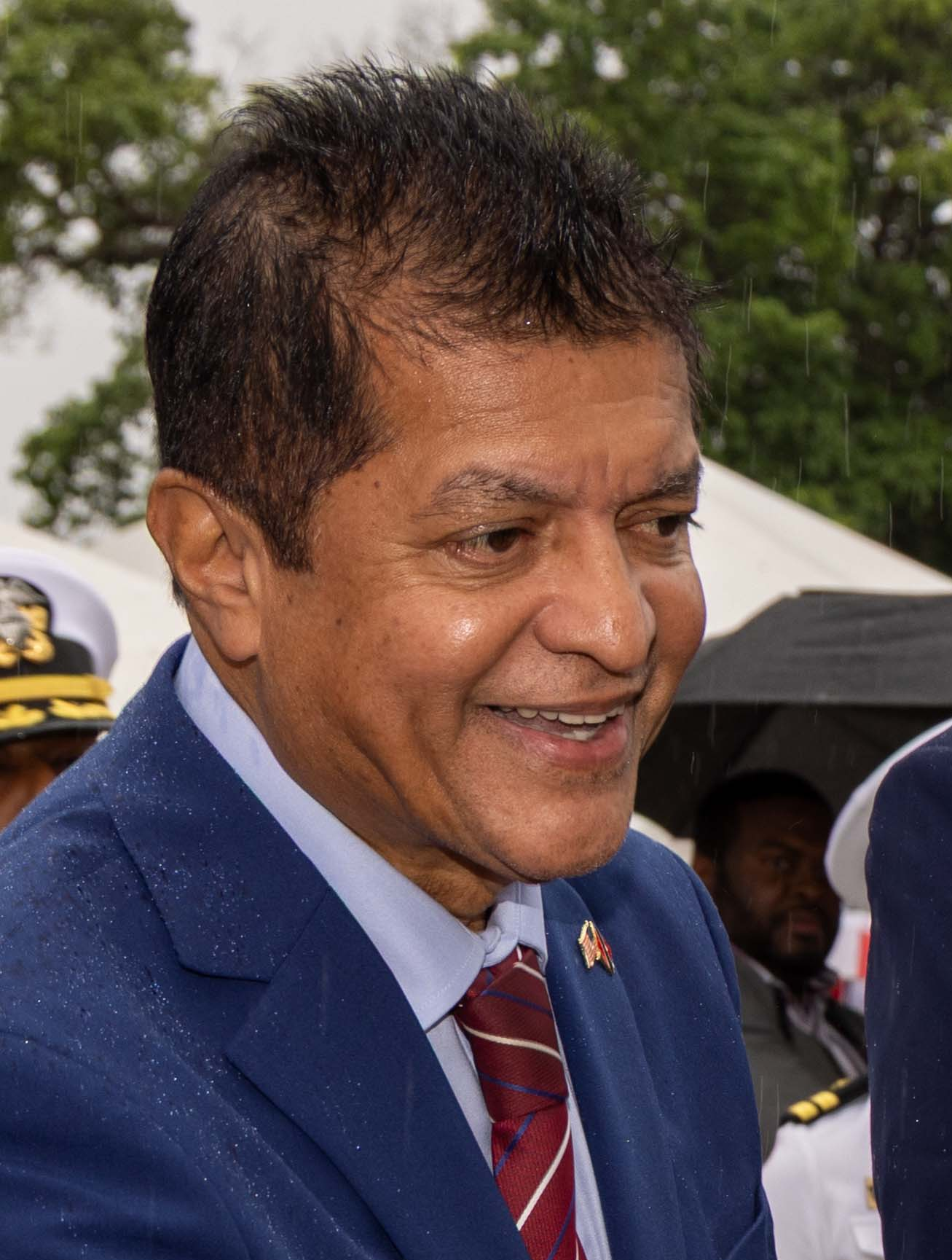
- Bodoe in 2025

Member of Parliament for Oropouche West
- Incumbent
- Assumed office 28 April 2025
- Preceded by: Davendranath Tancoo

Member of Parliament for Fyzabad
- In office 2015–2025
- Preceded by: Chandresh Sharma
- Succeeded by: Davendranath Tancoo

Personal details
- Party: United National Congress (UNC)

Lackram Persad Bodoe is a Trinidad and Tobago politician from the United National Congress.

== Biography ==
Bodoe was born and raised in Avocat Village, Fyzabad. He attended Avocat Vedic School, Naparima College San Fernando, the University of the West Indies and the Royal College of Obstetricians and Gynaecologists in the United Kingdom. Bodoe is a medical doctor by profession.

In the 2015 general election, Bodoe was elected to the House of Representatives in the Fyzabad constituency. He was re-elected in 2020. He was shadow health minister when his party was in opposition.

In the 2025 general election, he swapped seats with Davendranath Tancoo and contested the seat of Oropouche West instead. After the election he was appointed Minister of Health by Prime Minister Kamla Persad-Bissessar.

== Electoral history ==
2025 Trinidad and Tobago general election: Oropouche West
Party	Candidate	Votes	%	±%
UNC	Lackram Bodoe	11,882	80.6%	▲
PNM	Shawn Dube	2,349	15.9%	▼
PF	Alisha Mohammed	451	3.1%	Steady
Majority		9,533	64.7%	
Turnout		14,734	57.94%	
Registered electors		25,429		
UNC hold		Swing	%	
