= Caroni =

The name Caroni may refer to:

- Caroní River, one of the biggest rivers of the Orinoco basin in Venezuela
- Caroni River (Trinidad and Tobago), a major river on the island of Trinidad and Tobago
- Caroni Swamp, a major wetland on the west coast of the island of Trinidad
- Caroni Plain, plain in central Trinidad
- Caroni County, Trinidad and Tobago, formerly a major administrative division in Trinidad and Tobago
- Caroni Central (parliamentary constituency), Trinidad and Tobago
- Caroni East (parliamentary constituency), Trinidad and Tobago
- Caroni Village, Trinidad and Tobago, a present-day village within the former Caroni County
- Caroni (1975) Ltd., a former sugar producing company in Trinidad and Tobago
