= Iere High School =

Coordinates: 10.14752°N 61.50136°W

- Bayanie Street, De Gannes Village, Siparia 720506; Trinidad and Tobago

Information
- Type: Coeducational school
- Motto: Veritas Omnia Vincit (Truth Conquers All)
- Established: 1955

Iere High School is one of five Presbyterian secondary schools in Trinidad and Tobago, and it is notably the only coeducational of the five. Iere has gained over 50 academic scholarships over its establishment in 1955. The school is usually a First-choice secondary school by primary school students when writing their SEA The school requires at least over 85% in the Secondary Entrance Examination.

== Principals ==
- Rev. E. T. Lute (founder)
- Mr. Weldon Grant (1955-1961)
- Miss Constance Wager (1961-1964)
- Rev. Cyrill F. Beharry (1964-1981)
- Mr. Charles Sinanan (1981-1994)
- Mr. Sooksargar Babooram (1995-1999)
- Mr. Irving Hoosanie (1999-2001)
- Dr. Michael R. Dowlath (2001-2006)
- Mr. Roy Ramlogan (2006-2012)
- Mr Deraj Sookdeo (2012)
- Mr. Roy Nandlal (2012-2023)
- Ms. Sharon Umraw (2023-present)

== Notable alumni ==
- Kamla Persad-Bissessar, former and present Prime Minister of Trinidad and Tobago,
- Stacy Roopnarine, former Parliamentary Secretary in the Ministry of Sport and Youth Affairs
- Davendranath Tancoo, Minister of Finance
