= Vidia Gayadeen-Gopeesingh =

Trinidad and Tobago politician

Member of Parliament for Oropouche West
- In office 2015–2020
- Preceded by: Stacy Roopnarine
- Succeeded by: Davendranath Tancoo

Personal details
- Political party: United National Congress

Vidia Gayadeen-Gopeesingh is a Trinidad and Tobago politician from the United National Congress.

== Career ==
Vidia Gayadeen-Gopeesingh is an attorney-at-law. She was elected in the 2015 Trinidad and Tobago general election for the constituency of Oropouche West. While in parliament she spoke on issues such as food security, land ownership, housing, retirement age, agricultural state land leases, cyberbullying and border security.

== See also ==
- List of Trinidad and Tobago MPs
