= Nyan Gadsby-Dolly =

Trinidad and Tobago politician

Dr. Nyan Elizabeth Gadsby-Dolly is a Trinidad and Tobago politician from the People's National Movement. She has been MP for St. Ann's East in the House of Representatives since 2015.

== Education ==
After completing SEA at San Juan S.D.A. Primary School, she advanced to St. Augustine Girls' High School. She then earned a Bachelor's in Analytical Chemistry and a Post-Graduate Diploma in Educational Technology from The University of the West Indies, St. Augustine Campus, where she ultimately completed a Doctoral degree in Organic Chemistry in 2009.

== Career ==
In 2015 she was appointed Minister of Community Development, Culture and the Arts. In 2020 she became Minister of Education. Speaking at the Shell STREAM workforce conference at Hilton Trinidad on March 7, Dr. Nyan Gadsby-Dolly emphasized that students' futures remain open regardless of their high school career choices. She noted that scientific skills taught in school develop logical and critical thinking useful throughout life. Her own career path demonstrates this flexibility; despite holding a doctorate in Chemistry, she moved from teaching to her current role in politics.

In January 2023, she was appointed a PNM deputy political leader. She had been Vice Chairman. In May 2025, she was selected as PNM Chair.

== Electoral history ==
2025 Trinidad and Tobago general election: Saint Ann's East
Party	Candidate	Votes	%	±%
PNM	Nyan Gadsby-Dolly	7,472	55.3%	▼
COP	Gerrard Small	4,263	31.6%	Steady
PF	Kerron Brathwaite	1,242	9.2%	Steady
NTA	Jason Reece-Roper	472	3.5%	Steady
Majority		3,209	23.7%	▼
Turnout		13,502	44.84%	
Registered electors		30,113		
PNM hold				

== See also ==
- 12th Republican Parliament of Trinidad and Tobago
- 13th Republican Parliament of Trinidad and Tobago
