= Fyzabad (parliamentary constituency) =

Trinidad and Tobago parliamentary constituency

- Constituency for the Parliament of Trinidad and Tobago
- Fyzabad is number 39 on this map
- Electorate: 27,023 (2015)
- Major settlements: Fyzabad

Current constituency
- Created: 1961
- Party: United National Congress
- Member of Parliament: Davendranath Tancoo

Fyzabad is a parliamentary constituency in Trinidad and Tobago.

== Geography ==
The constituency contains the town of Fyzabad. It had an electorate of 27,023 as of 2015.

== Members ==
Election	Member	Party	Notes
1961	Vernon Jamadar	DLP	
1966	Muriel Donawa-McDavidson	PNM	
1971	Muriel Donawa-McDavidson	PNM	
1976	Winston Williams	PNM	
1981	Winston Williams	PNM	
1986	Arthur Sanderson	NAR	
1991	Chandresh Sharma	UNC	
1995	Chandresh Sharma	UNC	
2000	Chandresh Sharma	UNC	
2001	Chandresh Sharma	UNC	
2002	Chandresh Sharma	UNC	
2007	Chandresh Sharma	UNC	
2010	Chandresh Sharma	UNC	
2015	Lackram Bodoe	UNC	
2020	Lackram Bodoe	UNC	
2025	Davendranath Tancoo	UNC	

== Elections ==
2025 Trinidad and Tobago general election: Fyzabad
Party	Candidate	Votes	%	±%
UNC	Davendranath Tancoo	11,396	69.4%	▲
PNM	Kheron Khan	4,454	27.1%	▼
PF	Naomi Gopeesingh	539	3.3%	Steady
Majority		6,942	42.3%	▲
Turnout		16,422	59.78%	
Registered electors		27,471		
UNC hold				
