= Davendranath Tancoo =

Trinidad and Tobago politician

The Honourable Davendranath Tancoo MP

Minister of Finance
- Incumbent
- Assumed office 3 May 2025
- Prime Minister: Kamla Persad-Bissessar
- Preceded by: Vishnu Dhanpaul

Member of Parliament for Fyzabad
- Incumbent
- Assumed office 28 April 2025
- Preceded by: Lackram Bodoe

Member of Parliament for Oropouche West
- In office 2020–2025
- Preceded by: Vidia Gayadeen-Gopeesingh
- Succeeded by: Lackram Bodoe

Personal details
- Born: October 1965 (age 60) Fyzabad, Trinidad and Tobago
- Party: United National Congress

Davendranath "Dave" Tancoo (born October 1965 in Fyzabad, Trinidad) is an economist and attorney at law. Since 2025, he has served as Trinidad and Tobago's minister of finance and member of parliament for Fyzabad.

He is the chairman of the United National Congress and previously served as the party's General Secretary from 2010-2020.

He was elected to the House of Representatives as member of Parliament for Oropouche West on 10 August 2020 in the 2020 election. In the 2025 Trinidad and Tobago general election, his candidacy shifted to the neighbouring constituency of Fyzabad where he was elected MP on 28 April 2025.

Following the UNC's election victory, he was appointed Minister of Finance by Prime Minister Kamla Persad-Bissessar on 3 May 2025.

== Education ==
A graduate of Iere High School, he holds a Bachelor’s degree in Economics (Honours) from the University of the West Indies (St. Augustine campus), a Master’s in Business Administration (Merit) from Anglia Ruskin University, and is also a qualified attorney at law, completing his LLB (Honours) from the University of London and Legal Practice Certificate (Distinction) from Staffordshire University and was called to the Bar in 2018.

== Career ==
He served as Chief Economist to the Leader of the Opposition under Mr. Basdeo Panday (1990-1995) and Mrs. Kamla Persad-Bissessar, SC (2006-2010) and (2015-2020).

During the administration of Prime Minister Basdeo Panday, he acted as an adviser to the Kamla Persad-Bissessar in her roles as Attorney General, Minister of Legal Affairs, and Minister of Education.

Following Kamla Persad-Bissessar’s election as Prime Minister on May 24, 2010, he was appointed Special Adviser to the Prime Minister on Finance and the Economy where he provided the Prime Minister with advice and support on government’s economic, trade, and fiscal policies.

Upon his election to the House of Representatives in 2020, he held Parliamentary leadership roles as the Chairman of the Public Accounts Committee in the Twelfth Republican Parliament, was a member of the Joint Select Committees on the Representation of the People Amendment Bill (No.2) 2020 and the Shipping Bill 2020, and acted as the Opposition’s Deputy Chief Whip.

As the Opposition Shadow for Finance, he played a significant role at the Parliament's Standing Finance Committee meetings and during debates on the national budget and mid-year review.

== Electoral history ==
2025 Trinidad and Tobago general election: Fyzabad
Party	Candidate	Votes	%	±%
UNC	Davendranath Tancoo	11,396	69.4%	▲
PNM	Kheron Khan	4,454	27.1%	▼
PF	Naomi Gopeesingh	539	3.3%	Steady
Majority		6,942	42.3%	▲
Turnout		16,422	59.78%	
Registered electors		27,471		
UNC hold				

== See also ==
- 12th Republican Parliament of Trinidad and Tobago
- 13th Republican Parliament of Trinidad and Tobago
