= Mickela Panday =

Trinidadian politician

The Honourable Mickela Panday MP

Member of Parliament for Oropouche West
- In office 2007–2010
- Preceded by: constituency established
- Succeeded by: Stacy Roopnarine

Personal details
- Party: Patriotic Front (since 2019)
- Other political affiliations: United National Congress (until 2019)
- Parent: Basdeo Panday (father)
- Relatives: Subhas Panday (uncle); Sam Boodram (uncle)

Shalini Mickela Panday is a Trinidad and Tobago attorney who is the leader of the Patriotic Front. She represented Oropouche West in the House of Representatives from 2007 to 2010.

== Early life and education ==
Mickela Panday is of Indo-Trinidadian descent and is the daughter of former prime minister of Trinidad and Tobago Basdeo Panday and his wife Oma Panday. She completed her secondary education at Naparima Girls' High School and Naparima College in San Fernando.

Panday earned a bachelor of laws (LL.B.) and is a member of Gray’s Inn. She is a practicing attorney in Trinidad and Tobago.

== Career ==
Panday successfully contested the 2007 general elections as the United National Congress–Alliance candidate for the newly-formed Oropouche West constituency.

In the 2010 UNC leadership elections, Kamla Persad-Bissessar defeated Basdeo Panday to become the new leader of the party. Panday was screened as a candidate for the 2010 general elections, but neither she nor her uncle Subhas Panday (who was the incumbent member of Parliament for Princes Town) were selected by the party. Panday felt "victimised" by the selection of Stacy Roopnarine to replace her in the Oropouche West seat, saying "I didn't know who she was".

Panday led a slate of candidates called the Next Generation to contest the UNC leadership elections in 2012, but found herself and most of her family members absent from a list of party members. Panday and her mother were present on a revised list issued shortly before the election but her father and one of her sisters was not. After the Next Generation slate lost the party election, Panday raised questions about irregularities in the process, and the eligibility of San Fernando mayor Marlene Coudray, who was elected deputy political leader, but said she and her group had no plans to leave the party.

In 2019, Panday launched the Patriotic Front. The party did not contest the 2020 Trinidad and Tobago general election.

She was the Patriotic Front candidate for Couva North in the 2025 Trinidad and Tobago general election. This was the party's first election. She was not elected and the party won no seats, but the Patriotic Front received the third highest number of votes out of any party, even beating out the elected Tobago People's Party.

== Electoral history ==
2025 Trinidad and Tobago general election: Couva North
Party	Candidate	Votes	%	±%
UNC	Jearlean John	13,201	73.1%	▲
PNM	Brent Maraj	3,094	17.1%	▼
PF	Mickela Panday	1,727	9.6%	Steady
Majority		10,107	56.0%	▲
Turnout		18,064	58.88%	
Registered electors		30,681		
UNC hold				
