= Arnold Ram =

Trinidad and Tobago politician

The Honourable Arnold Ram MP

Member of Parliament for Caroni Central
- In office 19 August 2020 – 2025
- Preceded by: Bhoendradatt Tewarie
- Succeeded by: David Lee

Personal details
- Party: United National Congress (UNC)

Arnold Ram is a Trinidad and Tobago politician from the United National Congress. He represented Caroni Central in the House of Representatives from 2020 to 2025.

He was not selected to be a candidate in the 2025 Trinidad and Tobago general election.

== Education ==
Ram has graduated from the following institutions:

- University of London
- Edinburgh Business School
- University of Staffordshire
- University of the West Indies at St. Augustine
