= Oropouche West =

Trinidad and Tobago parliamentary constituency

- Constituency for the Parliament of Trinidad and Tobago
- Oropouche West is number 37 on this map
- Electorate: 24,348 (2015)
- Major settlements: Oropouche

Current constituency
- Created: 2007
- Number of members: 1
- Member of Parliament: Lackram Bodoe (UNC)

Oropouche West is a parliamentary constituency in Trinidad and Tobago.

== Geography ==
The constituency is located in the Oropouche area of Trinidad. It had an electorate of 24,348 as of 2015.

== Members ==
Election	Member	Party	Notes
2007	Mickela Panday	UNC	
2010	Stacy Roopnarine	UNC	
2015	Vidia Gayadeen-Gopeesingh	UNC	
2020	Davendranath Tancoo	UNC	
2025	Lackram Bodoe	UNC	

== Elections ==
2025 Trinidad and Tobago general election: Oropouche West
Party	Candidate	Votes	%	±%
UNC	Lackram Bodoe	11,882	80.6%	▲
PNM	Shawn Dube	2,349	15.9%	▼
PF	Alisha Mohammed	451	3.1%	Steady
Majority		9,533	64.7%	
Turnout		14,734	57.94%	
Registered electors		25,429		
UNC hold		Swing	%	
