= Stacy Roopnarine =

Trinidad and Tobago politician

The Honourable Stacy Roopnarine MP

Member of Parliament for Oropouche West
- In office 24 May 2010 – 7 September 2015
- Preceded by: Mickela Panday
- Succeeded by: Vidia Gayadeen-Gopeesingh

Personal details
- Party: UNC
- Education: University of the West Indies

Stacy Roopnarine is a Trinidad and Tobago politician from the United National Congress.

== Career ==
She was MP for Oropouche West in the House of Representatives from 2010 to 2015. At 25, she was the youngest candidate.

She was Minister of State in the Ministry of Works and Infrastructure in the People's Partnership government. In March 2015, she was moved to the Ministry of Gender, Youth and Child Development. She is a member of The Women Parliamentarians of TT (WPTT).

== Personal life ==
She married her husband Damian Lyder in 2012. They subsequently divorced in 2015.
