= David Lee (Trinidad and Tobago politician) =

Trinidad and Tobago politician

The Honourable David Lee MP

Member of Parliament for Caroni Central
- Incumbent
- Assumed office 28 April 2025
- Preceded by: Arnold Ram

Member of Parliament for Pointe-à-Pierre
- In office 7 September 2015 – 2025
- Preceded by: Errol McLeod
- Succeeded by: Hansen Narinesingh (Claxton Bay)

Personal details
- Party: United National Congress (UNC)

David A. Lee is a member of the House of Representatives of Trinidad and Tobago. He is a member of the United National Congress (UNC).

== Education ==
Lee holds a doctorate in engineering.

== Career ==
Lee was elected MP for Pointe-à-Pierre in the 2015 general election and re-elected in 2020. He was opposition Chief Whip. In 2022, he was arrested and charged with fraud, conspiracy and misbehaviour. The charges were in connection with the purchase of a $2.3 million Mercedes-Benz AMG G63 and the question of whether tax exemptions relating to the sale may have benefited a party financier. In April 2025, the trial collapsed. Lee claimed political persecution and thanked his party leader Kamla Persad-Bissessar for her support.

In the 2025 Trinidad and Tobago general election, Lee changed constituency to stand in Caroni Central. He was elected and was appointed Minister of Housing by Prime Minister Kamla Persad-Bissessar.

== Personal life ==
Lee is of Chinese descent.

== Electoral history ==
2025 Trinidad and Tobago general election: Caroni Central
Party	Candidate	Votes	%	±%
UNC	David Lee	12,663	68.7%	▲7.0
PNM	Adam Hosein	4,854	26.3%	▼10.65
PF	Andrew Hosein	914	5.0%	Steady
Majority		7,809	42.4%	
Turnout		18,477	58.73%	
Registered electors		31,460		
UNC hold				

== See also ==
- 12th Republican Parliament of Trinidad and Tobago
- 13th Republican Parliament of Trinidad and Tobago
