= Saint Ann's East =

Trinidad and Tobago parliamentary constituency

- Constituency for the House of Representatives
- Princes Town is number 34 on this map
- Electorate: 28,449 (2015)
- Major settlements: Saint Ann's

Current constituency
- Created: 1981
- Number of members: 1
- Member of Parliament: Nyan Gadsby-Dolly (PNM)

Saint Ann's East is a parliamentary constituency in Trinidad and Tobago.

== Geography ==
The constituency is located in the eastern areas of the suburb of Saint Ann's. It had an electorate of 28,449 as of 2015.

== Members ==
Election	Member	Party	Notes
1981	George Chambers	PNM	
1986	Lincoln Myers	NAR	
1991	Wendell Mottley	PNM	
1995	Martin Joseph	PNM	
2000	Martin Joseph	PNM	
2001	Martin Joseph	PNM	
2002	Anthony Roberts	PNM	
2007	Anthony Roberts	PNM	
2010	Joanne Thomas	PNM	
2015	Nyan Gadsby-Dolly	PNM	
2020	Nyan Gadsby-Dolly	PNM	
2025	Nyan Gadsby-Dolly	PNM	

== Elections ==
2025 Trinidad and Tobago general election: Saint Ann's East
Party	Candidate	Votes	%	±%
PNM	Nyan Gadsby-Dolly	7,472	55.3%	▼
COP	Gerrard Small	4,263	31.6%	Steady
PF	Kerron Brathwaite	1,242	9.2%	Steady
NTA	Jason Reece-Roper	472	3.5%	Steady
Majority		3,209	23.7%	▼
Turnout		13,502	44.84%	
Registered electors		30,113		
PNM hold				
