= Jearlean John =

Trinidad and Tobago politician

The Honourable Jearlean John

Member of the House of Representatives of Trinidad and Tobago for Couva North
- Incumbent
- Assumed office 28 April 2025
- Preceded by: Ravi Ratiram

Member of the Senate of Trinidad and Tobago
- In office 28 August 2020 – 2025

Personal details
- Party: United National Congress (UNC)

Jearlean K. John (born 1960) is a Trinidad and Tobago politician from the United National Congress.

== Early life ==
John was born in Charlotteville, Tobago.

== Political career ==
Jearlean John entered public life under Basdeo Panday and served as Transport Minister and Minister of Tourism and Tobago Affairs. Under Patrick Manning, she served as managing director of the Housing Development Corporation (HDC), role she held under the People's Partnership administration of Kamla Persad-Bissessar.

In the 2020 Trinidad and Tobago general election, she was the UNC candidate in La Horquetta/Talparo but she lost to Foster Cummings. She was subsequently appointed to the Senate as an opposition senator. In the 2025 Trinidad and Tobago general election, she was the UNC candidate in Couva North. She was elected over other candidates Brent Maraj and Mickela Panday. She was appointed Minister of Works and Infrastructure by Prime Minister Kamla Persad-Bissessar.

== Electoral history ==
2025 Trinidad and Tobago general election: Couva North
Party	Candidate	Votes	%	±%
UNC	Jearlean John	13,201	73.1%	▲
PNM	Brent Maraj	3,094	17.1%	▼
PF	Mickela Panday	1,727	9.6%	Steady
Majority		10,107	56.0%	▲
Turnout		18,064	58.88%	
Registered electors		30,681		
UNC hold				
