= 2003 Trinidadian local elections =

- 14 July 2003

All 126 electoral areas in the 14 municipal corporations of Trinidad
- Turnout: 37.9%
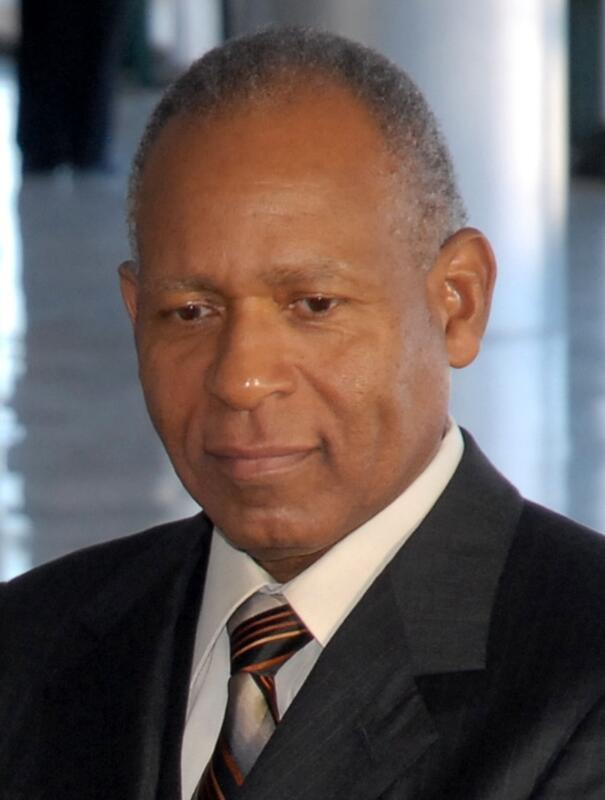

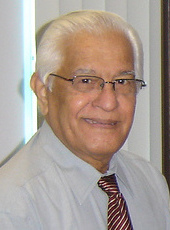
	First party	Second party
Leader	Patrick Manning	Basdeo Panday
Party	PNM	UNC
Seats won	83	43
Popular vote	172,525	147,727
Percentage	53.33%	45.66%

The 2003 Trinidadian local elections were held on Monday, July 14, 2003 for the regions and municipalities of Trinidad and Tobago. These municipalities and regions were created after the amendment of Act No.8 of 1992.

134 Local Areas will be contested in 14 Corporations.

- Diego Martin Regional Corporation
- Port of Spain City Corporation
- San Juan–Laventille Regional Corporation
- Tunapuna–Piarco Regional Corporation
- Arima Borough Corporation
- Sangre Grande Regional Corporation
- Chaguanas Borough Corporation
- Couva–Tabaquite–Talparo Regional Corporation
- San Fernando City Corporation
- Princes Town Regional Corporation
- Penal–Debe Regional Corporation
- Siparia Regional Corporation
- Point Fortin Borough Corporation
- Rio Claro–Mayaro Regional Corporation

== Results ==
Regional Corporation	PNM	UNC
Diego Martin Regional Corporation	**9**	0
Port of Spain City Corporation	**12**	0
San Juan/Laventille Regional Corporation	**10**	2
Tunapuna/Piarco Regional Corporation	**9**	4
Arima Borough Corporation	**7**	0
Sangre Grande Regional Corporation	**7**	0
Chaguanas Borough Corporation	3	**5**
Couva/Tabaquite/Talparo Regional Corporation	1	**9**
San Fernando City Corporation	**8**	1
Princes Town Regional Corporation	2	**7**
Penal/Debe Regional Corporation	1	**7**
Siparia Regional Corporation	**5**	3
Point Fortin Regional Corporation	**6**	0
Mayaro–Rio Claro Regional Corporation	**3**	**3**

Winning Party for each council in bold
