= Laventille Outreach for Vertical Enrichment =

Political party in Trinidad and Tobago

- Founded: 2010s

The Laventille Outreach for Vertical Enrichment (LOVE) is a political party in Trinidad and Tobago.

== History ==
The party first contested the 2015 Trinidad and Tobago general election but won no seats.

The party contested the 2025 Trinidad and Tobago general election as part of the "Coalition of Interests" with the United National Congress and the Progressive Empowerment Party. LOVE supported two candidates in two constituencies in the suburb of Laventille; Laventille East/Morvant and Laventille West.

== Electoral history ==
Election	Votes	%	Seats	+/–
2015	344	0.05	0	New
2020	did not contest			
2025	Part of the Coalition of Interests			

== See also ==
- List of political parties in Trinidad and Tobago
