= 1999 Trinidadian local elections =

- 12 July 1999

All 124 electoral areas in the 14 municipal corporations of Trinidad
- Turnout: 38.5%
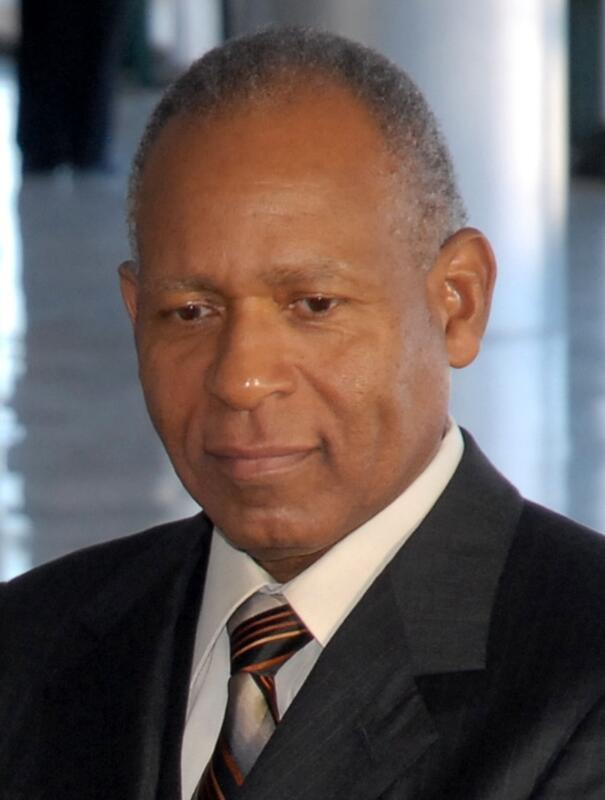

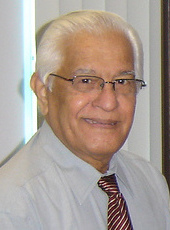
	First party	Second party
Leader	Patrick Manning	Basdeo Panday
Party	PNM	UNC
Seats won	66	58
Popular vote	156,991	175,879
Percentage	46.60%	52.21%

The 1999 Trinidadian local elections were held on Monday, July 12, 1999 for the regions and municipalities of Trinidad and Tobago. These municipalities and regions were created after the amendment of Act No.8 of 1992.

== Regional Corporations ==

134 Local Areas were contested in 14 Corporations.

- Diego Martin Regional Corporation
- Port of Spain City Corporation
- San Juan–Laventille Regional Corporation
- Tunapuna–Piarco Regional Corporation
- Arima Borough Corporation
- Sangre Grande Regional Corporation
- Chaguanas Borough Corporation
- Couva–Tabaquite–Talparo Regional Corporation
- San Fernando City Corporation
- Princes Town Regional Corporation
- Penal–Debe Regional Corporation
- Siparia Regional Corporation
- Point Fortin Borough Corporation
- Rio Claro–Mayaro Regional Corporation

The results are as follows:

== San Fernando City Corporation ==
Councillor Name	Area Represented
Hazel Rogers Dick	Les Efforts East/Cipero
Clive Braithwaite	Mon Repos/Navet
Leslie Lynch	Cocoyea/Tarouba
Torrance Mohammed	Pleasantville
Claire Boyce	Marabella South/Vistabella
Jennifer Marryshow	Marabella West
Sabrina Paul-Mowlah Baksh	Les Efforts West/La Romain
Ellis Chan	Marabella East
Wayne Poliah	Springvale Paradise
