= Barry Padarath =

Trinidad and Tobago politician

The Honourable Barry Padarath MP

Member of Parliament for Couva South
- Incumbent
- Assumed office 3 May 2025
- Preceded by: Rudranath Indarsingh

Member of Parliament for Princes Town
- In office 2015–2025
- Preceded by: Nela Khan
- Succeeded by: Aiyna Ali

Personal details
- Party: United National Congress

Barry Shiva Padarath is a Trinidad and Tobago politician from the United National Congress (UNC).

== Political career ==
He was elected to represent Princes Town in the House of Representatives in 2015. He was re-elected in 2020.

In the 2025 Trinidad and Tobago general election, he changed constituency to stand in Couva South. After the election he claimed it was the "best result for the United National Congress since the party's foundation". Padarath was appointed Minister in the Office of the Prime Minister and Minister of Public Utilities by Prime Minister Kamla Persad-Bissessar.

== Electoral history ==
2025 Trinidad and Tobago general election: Couva South
Party	Candidate	Votes	%	±%
UNC	Barry Padarath	13,122	73.4%	▲
PNM	Aaron Mohammed	3,763	21.0%	▼
PF	Imran Gokool	955	5.3%	Steady
Majority		9,359	52.4%	▲
Turnout		17,881	57.73%	
Registered electors		30,975		
UNC hold				

== See also ==
- 12th Republican Parliament of Trinidad and Tobago
- 13th Republican Parliament of Trinidad and Tobago
