= Rudranath Indarsingh =

Trinidadian and Tobagonian politician

The Honourable Rudranath Indarsingh MP

Member of Parliament for Couva South
- In office 24 May 2010 – 2025
- Preceded by: Kelvin Ramnath
- Succeeded by: Barry Padarath

Personal details
- Party: United National Congress

Rudranath Indarsingh is a Trinidadian and Tobagonian politician who represented Couva South in the House of Representatives in the Trinidad and Tobago Parliament from 2010 to 2025.

== Political career ==
Indarsingh served in the 8th Republican Parliament for one day, 29 Oct 2002 – 30 Oct 2002 to participate in the Budget Debate of 2002. On 28 May 2010 he was elected to the 10th Republican Parliament for Couva South and became Minister of State in the Ministry of Works and Transport.

On 17 Jan 2011 he became Minister of State in the Ministry of Labour and Small and Micro Enterprise Development. On 27 Jun 2011 he became Minister of State in the Ministry of Finance and the Economy. On 4 Jul 2012 he became an Opposition member. He was reelected on 23 Sep 2015 to the 11th Republican Parliament. He served as an Opposition member in the 12th Republican Parliament and was reelected on 19 Aug 2020.

He was deselected for the 2025 Trinidad and Tobago general election.

== Committees ==
In the 10th Republican Parliament he was on seven committees: Regulations, Public Accounts (Enterprises), Joint Select, Regulations, Statutory Instruments, Public Administration and Appropriations, and Standing Finance.

In the 11th Republican Parliament, he served on seven committees, including Standing, Statutory Instruments, and Privileges.

He serves on 6 committees on the 12th Republican Parliament: State Enterprises, Standing Finance, Statutory Instruments, and Social Services and Public Administration.

He served as President General of ATSGWTU, a trade union from 1999 to 2012. During his tenure the trade union was renamed from All Trinidad Sugar and General Workers' Trade Union to All Trinidad General Workers' Trade Union.
