= 2015 Trinidad and Tobago general election =

National election

- 7 September 2015

All 41 seats in the House of Representatives 21 needed for a majority
- Turnout: 66.84% (▼3.04 pp)
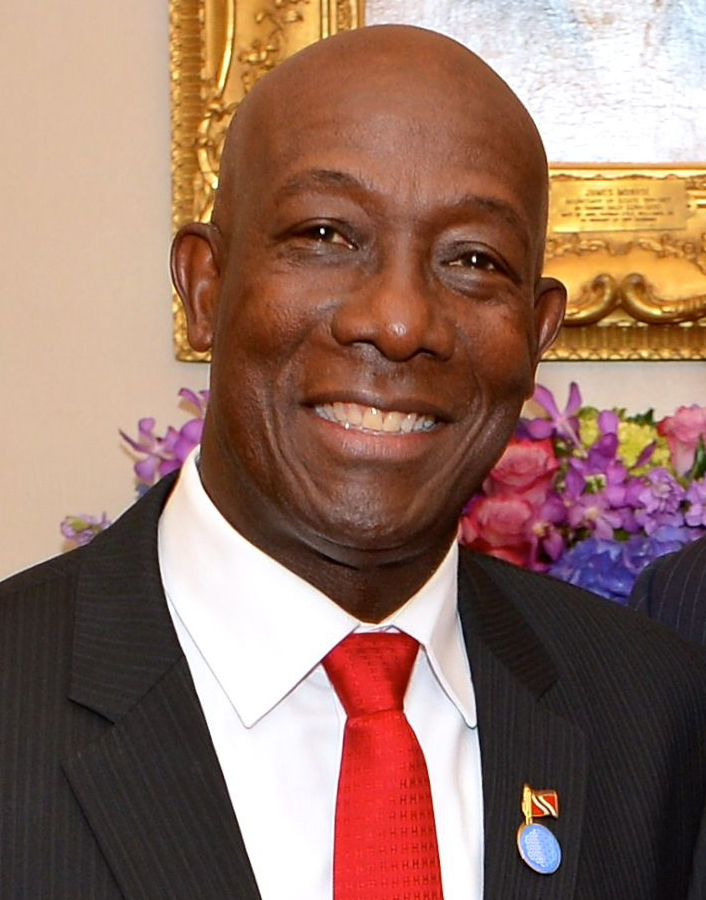

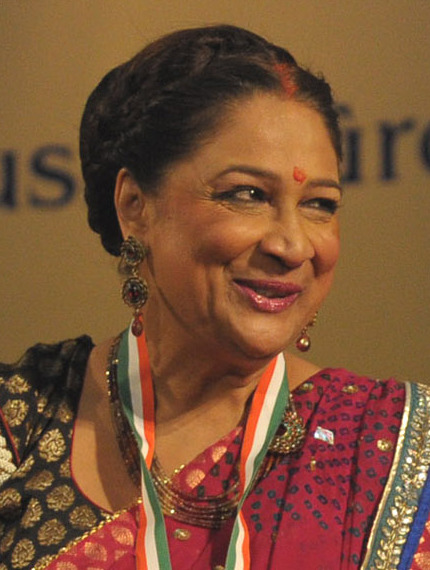
	First party	Second party	Third party
			COP
Leader	Keith Rowley	Kamla Persad-Bissessar	Prakash Ramadhar
Party	PNM	UNC	COP
Alliance		PP	PP
Leader since	26 May 2010	24 January 2010	3 July 2011
Leader's seat	Diego Martin West	Siparia	St. Augustine
Last election	12 seats, 39.5%	21 seats, 43.7%	6 seats, 14.12%
Seats won	23	17	1
Seat change	▲11	▼4	▼5
Popular vote	378,447	290,066	43,991
Percentage	51.68%	39.61%	6.01%
Swing	▲12.0 pp	▼4.1 pp	▼8.1 pp
Prime Minister before election
Kamla Persad-Bissessar
UNC
Subsequent Prime Minister
Keith Rowley
PNM

General elections were held in Trinidad and Tobago on 7 September 2015. The date of the general elections was announced by Prime Minister Kamla Persad-Bissessar on 13 June 2015. The result was a victory for the opposition People's National Movement, which received 52% of the vote and won 23 of the 41 seats in the House of Representatives.

== Background ==
The 2010 general elections were won by the People's Partnership (PP) coalition, an alliance of the United National Congress (UNC), the National Joint Action Committee (NJAC), the Congress of the People (COP) and the Tobago Organisation of the People (TOP). The PP took 29 of the 41 seats, with the People's National Movement (PNM) winning the other 12. Prior to the 2015 general elections, two by-elections were held in St Joseph and Chaguanas West, which saw the seats held by the PP won by the PNM and Independent Liberal Party (ILP) respectively.

== Electoral system ==
The 41 elected members of the House of Representatives were elected in single-member constituencies using first-past-the-post. A total of 2,199 polling stations were used.

== Campaign ==
A total of 127 candidates contested the election for 17 different political parties, with another five running as independents. The PNM was the only party to contest all 41 seats, and only two other parties contested more than half the seats; the United National Congress ran in 28 and the ILP in 26.

The COP ran in eight seats, the Laventille Outreach for Vertical Enrichment, the NJAC, New National Vision and Trinidad Humanity Campaign all contested three seats, whilst Tobago Forwards, the TOP and the Platform of Truth ran in two. The other parties only nominated a single candidate, including the Democratic Development Party, the Independent Democratic Party, the National Coalition for Transportation, the New Voice, the Youth Empowerment Party and the Youth, National Organisations, Farmers Unification, Policy Reformation.

The UNC, NJAC, COP and TOP again ran under the PP banner, and did not run candidates against each other.

Opposition leader Keith Rowley described the election campaign as one of the most "gruelling" in the country's history, but highlighted that the campaign had been conducted in high spirits and without violence or unrest.

== Results ==
Preliminary results on election night indicated that the PNM had won a majority government with 22 of 41 seats, but with a majority of the popular vote flowing to the ruling People's Partnership coalition. On the final count however the PNM clearly secured an absolute majority of votes cast and obtained an extra seat from the PP, winning 23 of the 41 seats. The four parties in the PP alliance received a combined 46.6% of the vote, winning the remaining eighteen seats.

Party	Votes	%	Seats	+/–
People's National Movement	378,447	51.68	23	+11
United National Congress (PP)	290,066	39.61	17	−4
Congress of the People (PP)	43,991	6.01	1	−5
National Joint Action Committee (PP)	5,790	0.79	0	0
Independent Liberal Party	5,123	0.70	0	New
Tobago Forwards	2,162	0.30	0	New
Tobago Organisation of the People (PP)	1,750	0.24	0	−2
New National Vision	883	0.12	0	0
Platform of Truth	469	0.06	0	New
Laventille Outreach for Vertical Enrichment	344	0.05	0	New
National Coalition for Transportation	331	0.05	0	New
Democratic Development Party	153	0.02	0	New
Trinidad Humanity Campaign	138	0.02	0	New
Independent Democratic Party	108	0.01	0	New
The New Voice	101	0.01	0	New
Youth, National Organisations, Farmers Unification, Policy Reformation	74	0.01	0	New
Youth Empowerment Party	34	0.00	0	New
Independents	2,376	0.32	0	0
**Total**	**732,340**	**100.00**	**41**	**0**
Valid votes	732,340	99.67		
Invalid/blank votes	2,452	0.33		
Total votes	**734,792**	**100.00**		
Registered voters/turnout	1,099,279	66.84		
Source: EBCTT, EBCTT, Caribbean Elections

=== By constituency ===
Winning candidates are in bold.

Constituency	PP	PNM	ILP	Others
Arima	Rodger Samuel (COP)	**Anthony Garcia**	Donna Jennings	
Arouca/Maloney	Wendell Eversley (COP)	**Camille Robinson-Regis**		
Barataria/San Juan	**Fuad Khan (UNC)**	Hafeez Ali		Jonathan Thomas (YEP)
Caroni Central	**Bhoe Tewarie (UNC)**	Avinash Singh	Michelle Johnson	
Caroni East	**Tim Gopeesingh (UNC)**	Sara Budhu	Abuzar Mohammed	
Chaguanas East	**Fazal Karim (UNC)**	Parbatee Helen Maharaj	Jack Warner	
Chaguanas West	**Ganga Singh (UNC)**	Abbgail Nandalal	Amarath Jagassar	
Couva North	**Ramona Ramdial (UNC)**	Richard Ragoonannan	Sunil Ramjitsingh	
Couva South	**Rudy Indarsingh (UNC)**	Alif Mohammed	Kelly Dingoor	
Cumuto/Manzanilla	**Christine Newallo-Hosein (UNC)**	Bharath Barry Lochan	Dr Lena Brereton	Krish Poonwasee (Independent)
D'Abadie/O'Meara	Patricia Metivier (COP)	**Ancil Antoine**	Dominic Romain	
Diego Martin Central	Embau Moheni (NJAC)	**Darryl Smith**	Kathy Ann Lamont	
Diego Martin North/East	Garvin Nicholas (UNC)	**Colm Imbert**		Saaleha Abu Bakr (NNV)
Diego Martin West	Avonelle Hector (COP)	**Keith Rowley**	Taja Carringhton	Fuad Abu Bakr (NNV); Phillip Alexander (Independent); Zafir David (THC)
Fyzabad	**Lackram Bodoe (UNC)**	Marsha Bailey	Fabian Anthony Assie	
La Brea	Ramesh Ramnannan (UNC)	**Nicole Olivierre**	Kefing Jason Chance	
La Horquetta/Talparo	Jairam Seemungal (UNC)	**Maxie Cuffie**		
Laventille East/Morvant	Kathy Ann Francis (NJAC)	**Adrian Leonce**	Fitzdavid Samuel	Niya Pierre (LOVE)
Laventille West	Malcolm Kernahan (NJAC)	**Fitzgerald Hinds**	Trent Holdip	
Lopinot/Bon Air West	Lincoln Douglas (COP)	**Cherrie Ann Crichlow-Cockburn**	Nigel Reyes	
Mayaro	**Rushton Paray (UNC)**	Clarence Rambharat	Andrew Brooks	
Moruga/Tableland	Clifton De Coteau (UNC)	**Lovell Francis**	Andre Clifford	
Naparima	**Rodney Charles (UNC)**	Dons Waithe	Riza hosein	
Oropouche East	**Roodal Moonilal (UNC)**	Terry Jadoonannan		
Oropouche West	**Vidia Goopiesingh (UNC)**	Clifford Rambharose		
Point Fortin	Ravi Ratiram (UNC)	**Edmund Dillion**		
Pointe-à-Pierre	**David Lee (UNC)**	Neil Mohammed	Patrina Mark Bascombe	
Port of Spain North/St. Ann's West	Eli Zakour (UNC)	**Stuart Young**		
Port of Spain South	Cleveland Garcia (COP)	**Marlene McDonald**		
Princes Town	**Barry Padarath (UNC)**	Nikoleiskai Ali		
San Fernando East	Ashaki Scott (COP)	**Randall Mitchell**	Ricardo Lee Sing	
San Fernando West	Raziah Ahmed (UNC)	**Faris Al-Rawi**	Joseph Mendes	
Siparia	**Kamla Persad-Bissessar (UNC)**	Vidya Deokiesingh		
St. Ann's East	Don Sylverter (UNC)	**Nyan Gadsby-Dolly**	Geewan Ramdeen	
St. Augustine	**Prakash Ramadhar (COP)**	Alisha Romano		
St. Joseph	Vasant Bharath (UNC)	**Terrence Deyalsingh**		Errol Fabien (Independent)
Tabaquite	**Suruj Rambachan (UNC)**	Kevin Chan		
Tobago East	Joseph Fredrick (TOP)	**Ayanna Webster-Roy**		Juliana Henry-King (TPT); Peter Caruth (TF)
Tobago West	Natasha Ann Second (TOP)	**Shamfa Cudjoe**	Paul Peters	Hochoy Charles (TPT); Christlyn Moore (TF)
Toco/Sangre Grande	Brent Sancho (UNC)	**Glenda Jennings-Smith**	Dayne Francois	
Tunapuna	Wayne Munroe (UNC)	**Esmond Forde**		Marcus Ramkissoon (THC)
