= Coalition of Interests =

- Abbreviation: CoI
- Leader: Kamla Persad-Bissessar
- Founder: Kamla Persad-Bissessar; Phillip Edward Alexander; Lennox Smith; Ancel Roget
- Founded: February 12, 2025
- Merger of: UNC; COP; PEP; LOVE; OWTU; PSA; TTPWU; FSA
- Headquarters: 5 Mulchan Seuchan Road, Chaguanas, Trinidad and Tobago
- Ideology: Social democracy Labourism; Multiculturalism
- Political position: Centre-left
- Colors: Yellow
- Senate: 16 / 31
- House of Representatives: 26 / 41

The Coalition of Interests (abbr. CoI) is an electoral alliance in Trinidad and Tobago formed on 12 February 2025 to contest the 2025 Trinidad and Tobago general election consisting of the United National Congress, its anchor party, as well as the Congress of the People, Progressive Empowerment Party, and the Laventille Outreach for Vertical Enrichment parties, and the Oilfields Workers' Trade Union, Public Services Association, Trinidad and Tobago Postal Workers’ Union, and the Fire Service Association trade unions.

CoI won the election, winning 26 seats, and CoI leader Kamla Persad-Bissessar became Prime Minister of Trinidad and Tobago. The UNC was the only party in the coalitions to win parliamentary seats.
