= Progressive Empowerment Party =

Political party in Trinidad and Tobago

- Leader: Phillip Edward Alexander
- Founded: 2017
- Dissolved: 2025
- Merged into: United National Congress
- Colors: Orange

The Progressive Empowerment Party (PEP) was a political party in Trinidad and Tobago.

== History ==
The Progressive Empowerment Party was founded in 2017. The PEP sought to become the country's third party.

The PEP stood 31 candidates in the 2020 Trinidad and Tobago general election but won no seats. They stood candidates in the 2023 Trinidadian local elections but performed poorly.

In November 2023, its founder and political leader, Phillip Edward Alexander resigned. Limma McLeod Wilkinson became its interim leader. In March 2024, Alexander returned as leader.

The PEP contested the 2025 Trinidad and Tobago general election as part of the Coalition of Interests) with the United National Congress and the Laventille Outreach for Vertical Enrichment movement. The PEP contested three seats — Diego Martin West, Diego Martin North/East, and Port of Spain North/Saint Ann's West, where Alexander challenged prime minister Stuart Young.

The party won no seats in the election, and announced its intention to disband. Alexander announced that he will be joining the UNC and that he "anticipate[d] roles for members of the PEP within the UNC". Phillip Alexander joined the Persad-Bissessar administration as Minister in the Ministry of Housing.

== Election results ==
=== House of Representatives ===
Election	Party leader	Votes			Seats		Position	Government
Election	Party leader	No.	%	±	No.	±	Position	Government
2020	Phillip Alexander	5,930	0.90	New	0 / 41	New	4th	Extra-parliamentary
2025	Phillip Alexander	9,378	1.51	▲0.61	0 / 41	0	5th	Extra-parliamentary

== See also ==
- List of political parties in Trinidad and Tobago
