= Ravi Ratiram =

Trinidad and Tobago politician

The Honourable Ravi Ratiram MP

Member of Parliament for Couva North
- In office 19 August 2020 – 2025
- Preceded by: Ramona Ramdial
- Succeeded by: Jearlean John

Personal details
- Party: United National Congress (UNC)
- Education: University of the West Indies at St. Augustine (BSc); Anglia Ruskin University (MBA)

Ravi Ratiram is a Trinidad and Tobago politician representing the United National Congress (UNC). He was a Member of Parliament in the House of Representatives for Couva North in the 2020 general election. He is the current party organiser for the UNC.

== Early life ==
His mother was a homemaker and his father was a car salesman and taxi driver. He attended Rousillac Hindu Primary School, Point Fortin Senior Comprehensive School, Siparia Senior Comprehensive School, and San Fernando Technical Institute.

Ratiram then studied at the University of the West Indies at St. Augustine, where he received a bachelor's degree in electrical and computer engineering. He was president of the Engineering Students’ Society and later served as vice president and then president of the Guild of Students at UWI. He has an MBA in leadership, entrepreneurship and innovation from the Anglia Ruskin University. He also received a certificate in global leadership from the University of the Virgin Islands. He worked at the Carlisle Tire and Rubber Company early in his career and then later worked as the deputy general manager at the Public Transport Service Corporation.

== Political career ==
Ratiram was appointed as a temporary Government Senator in the Senate from 20 September 2010 to 21 September 2010. He contested the constituency of La Brea in the 2007 general election and the constituency of Point Fortin in the 2015 general election. He has been a member of the National Executive of the United National Congress since 28 November 2015, when he was elected as the party organiser. He was elected as a Member of Parliament in the House of Representatives for Couva North on 19 August 2020 in the 2020 general election.

After the 2025 Trinidad and Tobago general election, he joined the Senate as Minister of Agriculture and Fisheries.

== Personal life ==
Ratiram is separated from his wife and has two daughters. He is a cancer survivor, as he was diagnosed with non-Hodgkin's lymphoma in 1996. He is a soca artist.

Political offices
Preceded by Ramona Ramdial	Member of Parliament for Couva North; 2020–present	Incumbent
