= Caroni Central =

Trinidad and Tobago parliamentary constituency

- Constituency for the Parliament of Trinidad and Tobago
- Caroni Central is number 24 on this map
- Electorate: 27,887 (2015)
- Major settlements: Caroni County

Current constituency
- Created: 1991
- Number of members: 1
- Member of Parliament: David Lee (UNC)

Caroni Central is a parliamentary constituency in Trinidad and Tobago.

== Geography ==
Caroni Central is located in the central areas of the Caroni Plain. It had an electorate of 27,887 as of 2015.

== Members ==
Election	Member	Party	Notes
1956	Mitra Gokhale Sinanan	PDP	
Constituency not in use
1991	Raymond Palackdharrysingh	UNC	
1995	Hamza Rafeeq	UNC	
2000	Hamza Rafeeq	UNC	
2001	Hamza Rafeeq	UNC	
2002	Hamza Rafeeq	UNC	
2007	Hamza Rafeeq	UNC	
2010	Glenn Ramadharsingh	UNC	
2015	Bhoendradatt Tewarie	UNC	
2020	Arnold Ram	UNC	
2025	David Lee	UNC	

== Elections ==
2025 Trinidad and Tobago general election: Caroni Central
Party	Candidate	Votes	%	±%
UNC	David Lee	12,663	68.7%	▲7.0
PNM	Adam Hosein	4,854	26.3%	▼10.65
PF	Andrew Hosein	914	5.0%	Steady
Majority		7,809	42.4%	
Turnout		18,477	58.73%	
Registered electors		31,460		
UNC hold				
