= Fyzabad =

- Town
- Location of Fyzabad, Trinidad and Tobago Fyzabad (the Caribbean) Fyzabad (North America)
- Coordinates: 10°11′N 61°33′W
- Country: Trinidad and Tobago
- Region: Siparia
- Settled: 1871
- Named for: Faizabad, Uttar Pradesh, India

Population (2011)
  - Total: 13,099
- Time zone: UTC−4 (AST)
- Postal Code(s): 69xxxx
- Area code: +1 (868)-677

Fyzabad (/ˈfaɪzəˌbæd/) is a town in southwestern Trinidad, 13 km (8.1 mi) south of San Fernando, west of Siparia and northeast of Point Fortin. It is named after the town of Faizabad in India. Colloquially it is known as "Fyzo" by many people.

== History ==
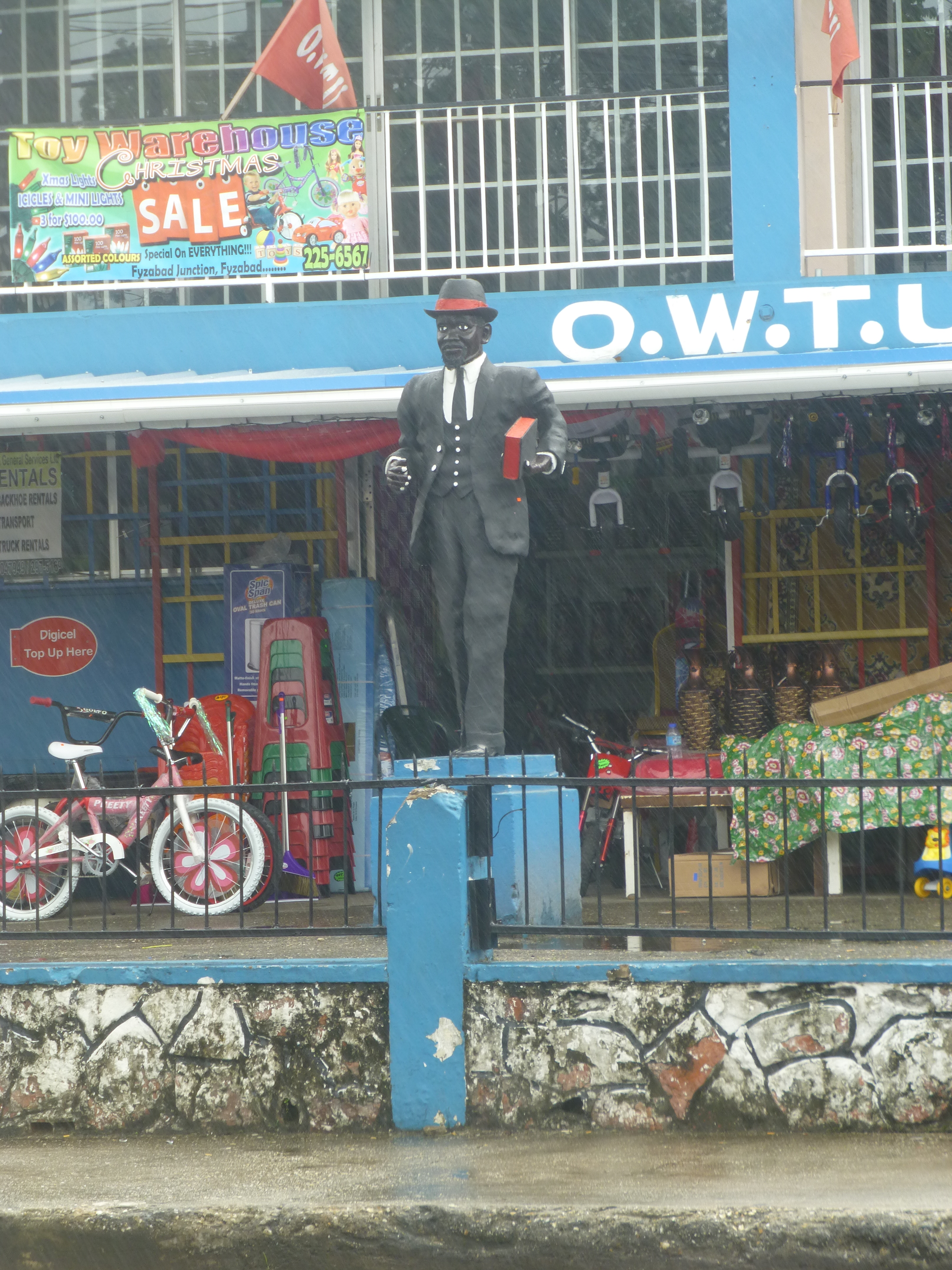
Uriah Butler statue in Fyzabad

Fyzabad was founded by Rev. Kenneth J. Grant, a Presbyterian missionary in Trinidad in 1871. The purpose of the settlement was to separate Christian Indians from the unconverted Hindu and Muslim populations. The town later grew with the discovery of oil in the area in 1917, and attracted a large number of immigrants from Grenada and other Lesser Antillean islands. In 1937 Fyzabad was the centre of labour unrest, led by T.U.B. Butler which is considered the birth of the Labour movement in Trinidad and Tobago.

The collapse of oil prices in the 1980s, coupled with declining onshore oil production, led to a decline in the town of Fyzabad.

== Politics ==
Fyzabad is part of the Fyzabad parliamentary constituency for elections to the Parliament of Trinidad and Tobago.

== Notable people ==
- Ronnie Boodoosingh, Chief Justice of Trinidad and Tobago
- Tubal Uriah Butler, preacher and union leader
- Anthony Carmona, fifth president of Trinidad and Tobago
- Michael Fisher, physicist
- Billy Ocean, British R&B and pop singer, born Leslie Charles
- Lennox Superville, Trinidadian-American professor, mathematician, and engineer
