= 2025 Trinidad and Tobago general election =

- 28 April 2025

All 41 seats in the House of Representatives 21 seats needed for a majority
- Turnout: 53.92% (▼4.16pp)
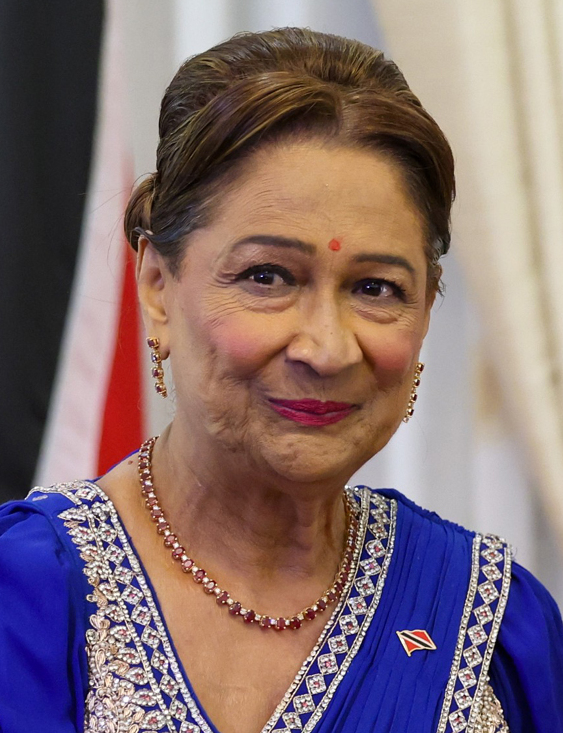

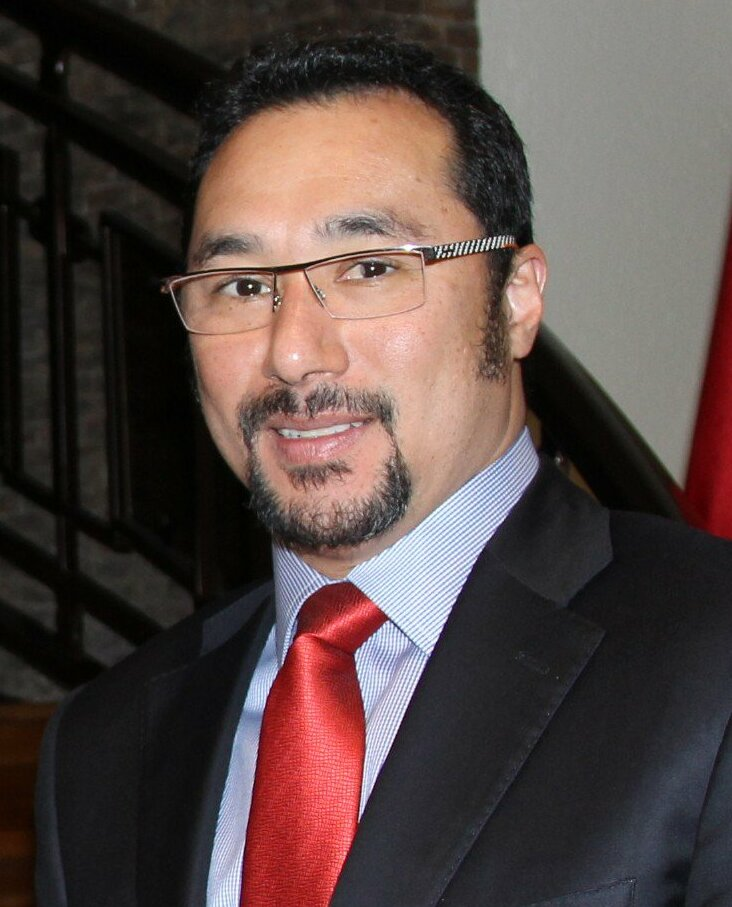

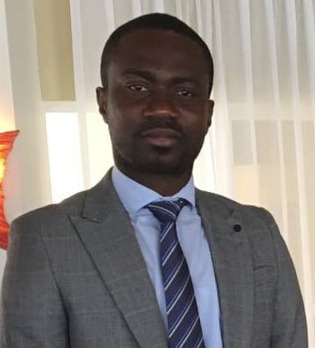
| | First party | Second party | Third party |
|---|---|---|---|
| Leader | Kamla Persad-Bissessar | Stuart Young | Farley C. Augustine |
| Party | UNC | PNM | TPP |
| Alliance | COI (Note: UNC/COP/PEP with support from LOVE/OWTU/PSA) |
| Last election | 47.14%, 19 seats | 49.05%, 22 seats | New |
| Seats won | 26 | 13 | 2 |
| Seat change | ▲7 | ▼9 | ▲2 |
| Popular vote | 335,161 | 224,403 | 13,857 |
| Percentage | 54.04% | 36.18% | 2.23% |
| Swing | ▲6.90pp | ▼12.87pp | New |
Prime Minister before election
Stuart Young
PNM
Elected Prime Minister
Kamla Persad-Bissessar
UNC

General elections were held in Trinidad and Tobago on 28 April 2025 to elect all 41 members of the House of Representatives. President Christine Kangaloo, on the advice of Prime Minister Stuart Young, dissolved parliament and issued the writs for election on 18 March 2025.

This was the first election after the Elections and Boundaries Commission (EBC) redrew the boundaries for 16 constituencies, and renamed five of them. Seventeen political parties and three independents contested the election.

The United National Congress won 26 seats, forming a majority government, with its leader Kamla Persad-Bissessar becoming prime minister for the second time since she was elected leader in 2010. The governing People's National Movement led by former prime minister Keith Rowley and Stuart Young as prime ministerial candidate won 13 seats, losing power and becoming the opposition. The Tobago People's Party led by Tobago House of Assembly Chief Minister Farley Augustine won both Tobago seats. According to party organiser Barry Padarath, it was the best result for the United National Congress since the party's foundation.

In the aftermath of the election, Young resigned as PNM party chairman on April 30, and Rowley announced his intention to resign as political leader of the PNM on May 1. Kamla Persad-Bissessar and John Jeremie were sworn in as Prime Minister and Attorney General respectively on May 1.

== Electoral system ==
The 41 members of the House of Representatives are elected by first-past-the-post voting in single-member constituencies. Registered voters must be 18 years and over, must reside in an electoral district/constituency for at least two months prior to the qualifying date, be a citizen of Trinidad and Tobago or a Commonwealth citizen residing legally in Trinidad and Tobago for a period of at least one year.

If one party obtains a majority of seats, then that party is entitled to form the Government, with its leader as Prime Minister. If the election results in no single party having a majority, then there is a hung parliament. In this case, the options for forming the Government are either a minority government or a coalition government.

== Parties ==
Political parties registered with the Elections and Boundaries Commission (EBC) can contest the general election as a party.

The leader of the party commanding a majority of support in the House of Representatives is the person who is called on by the president to form a government as prime minister, while the leader of the largest party or coalition not in government becomes the Leader of the Opposition.

The People's National Movement and the United National Congress have been the two biggest parties, in addition to having supplied every prime minister since 1991.

The following registered parties contested the general election. One hundred and fifty-eight candidates representing seventeen parties and three independent candidates contested the election.

=== Trinidad and Tobago ===
Two parties — the PNM and the Patriotic Front — contested seats in both Trinidad and Tobago.

| Party | Founded | Political position and ideology | Leader | Leader since | Leader's seat | Last election | | Current seats | Seats contesting |
| Party | Founded | Political position and ideology | Leader | Leader since | Leader's seat | % party vote | Seats | Current seats | Seats contesting |
|---|---|---|---|---|---|---|---|---|---|
| PNM | 1955 | Centre to centre-left Liberalism, Social liberalism, Nationalism | Keith Rowley | May 2010 | 49.05% | 13 / 41 (32%) | | 41 | |
| PF | 2019 | Centre-left to left | Mickela Panday | May 2019 | None | – | – | – | 37 |

=== Trinidad only ===
Ten parties and two independents contested seats only in Trinidad.

| Party | Founded | Political position and ideology | Leader(s) | Leader since | Leader's seat | Last election | | Current seats | Seats contesting |
| Party | Founded | Political position and ideology | Leader(s) | Leader since | Leader's seat | % party vote | Seats | Current seats | Seats contesting |
Coalition of Interests
| UNC | 1989 | Centre-left | Kamla Persad-Bissessar | January 2010 | Siparia | 47.14% | 19 / 41 (46%) | 19 / 41 (46%) | 34 |
| COP | 2006 | Centre-left; Reformism | Prakash Ramadhar | January 2025 | None | 0.07% | 0 / 41 (0%) | 0 / 41 (0%) | 2 |
| PEP | 2017 | | Phillip Alexander | January 2017 | None | 0.90% | 0 / 41 (0%) | 0 / 41 (0%) | 3 |
People's Alliance
| NTA | 2022 | Social liberalism | Gary Griffith | April 2022 | None | New party | | 0 / 41 (0%) | 17 |
No alliance
| NNV | 1994 | | Fuad Abu Bakr | April 2010 | None | 0.08% | 0 / 41 (0%) | 0 / 41 (0%) | 1 |
| All People's Party (Trinidad and Tobago) | 2024 | Centre-left | Kezel Jackson | July 2024 | None | New party | | 0 / 41 (0%) | 8 |
| THC | 2010 | | Marcus Ramkissoon | 2010 | None | 0.06% | 0 / 41 (0%) | 0 / 41 (0%) | 3 |
| NCT | | | | | None | New party | | 0 / 41 (0%) | 2 |
| MND | 2019 | Diego Martin regionalism | Garvin Nicholas | September 2019 | None | 0.16% | 0 / 41 (0%) | 0 / 41 (0%) | 1 |
| The Hyarima Movement | | | Francis Morean | | None | New party | | 0 / 41 (0%) | 1 |

=== Tobago only ===
Five parties and one independent contested seats only in Tobago.

| Party | Founded | Political position and ideology | Leader(s) | Leader since | Leader's seat | Last election | | Current seats | Seats contesting |
| Party | Founded | Political position and ideology | Leader(s) | Leader since | Leader's seat | % party vote | Seats | Current seats | Seats contesting |
|---|---|---|---|---|---|---|---|---|---|
| TPP | 2023 | Tobago regionalism | Farley Chavez Augustine | August 2023 | None | New party | | 0 / 41 (0%) | 2 |
| PDP | 2016 | Tobago regionalism | Watson Duke | July 2016 | None | 1.58% | 0 / 41 (0%) | 0 / 41 (0%) | 2 |
| IDA | | | | | None | New party | | 0 / 41 (0%) | 2 |
| CARM | | | | | None | New party | | 0 / 41 (0%) | 1 |
| Unity of the People | | | | | None | New party | | 0 / 41 (0%) | 1 |

== Endorsements ==
| Type | PNM | UNC | COP | PEP | PF | NTA | HOPE | TPP | PDP |
|---|---|---|---|---|---|---|---|---|---|
| Media | Jaron "Uncommon" Nurse; Akeem "Preedy" Chance | Drupatee Ramgoonai; Dwayne Bravo; Adesh Samaroo; Iwer George | | | | | | | |
| Public figures | Dinesh Rambally (former UNC MP for Chaguanas West, pandit, and executive member of the Sanatan Dharma Maha Sabha); Larry Lalla (former UNC member and Senior counsel attorney) | Ancil Roget (Joint Trade Union Movement - JTUM president); Rudi Atwell (Aviation Communication and Allied Workers' Union - ACAWU Secretary General); John Jeremie (former PNM minister) | | | Roshan Parvani (Panameñista Party) | | | | |
| Unions and business associations | | Oilfields Workers' Trade Union; Public Services Association; Trinidad and Tobago Postal Workers' Union; Fire Service Association | | | | | | | |

== Members who did not seek re-election ==
| Member | Party | Constituency | Notes |
|---|---|---|---|
| Rai Ragbir | UNC | Cumuto/Manzanilla | |
| Dinesh Rambally | UNC | Chaguanas West | |
| Adrian Leonce | PNM | Laventille East/Morvant | |
| Fitzgerald Hinds | PNM | Laventille West | |
| Anita Haynes | UNC | Tabaquite | |
| Rodney Charles | UNC | Naparima | |
| Rushton Paray | UNC | Mayaro | |
| Rudranath Indarsingh | UNC | Couva South | |
| Keith Rowley | PNM | Diego Martin West | |

== Campaign ==
Kamla Persad-Bissessar campaigned on increasing public sector salaries, protecting pensions and reopening the state oil company Petrotrin. The proposals were criticised by Stuart Young as unrealistic, saying that they would need $2 billion in funding.

=== Marginal seats ===
The following lists identify and rank seats by the margin by which the party's candidate finished behind the winning candidate in the 2020 election.

For information purposes only, seats that have changed hands through subsequent by elections have been noted. Seats whose members have changed party allegiance are ignored.

Marginal seats by party (with winning parties and margins from the 2020 Trinidad and Tobago general election)
| People's National Movement | | | United National Congress | | |
Marginal
| 1 | St. Joseph (renamed Aranguez/St Joseph) | 4.5% | 1 | Moruga/Tableland | 5.3% |
| 2 | Tobago East | 9.7% | 2 | Chaguanas East | 6.4% |
| 3 | La Horquetta/Talparo | 10.9% | 3 | Barataria/San Juan | 6.7% |
| 4 | San Fernando West | 10.9% | 4 | Pointe-à-Pierre (renamed Claxton Bay) | 9.1% |
| 5 | Tunapuna | 11.2% | 5 | Cumuto/Manzanilla | 17.9% |
| 6 | Toco/Sangre Grande | 18.7% | 6 | Mayaro | 18.7% |
| 7 | Point Fortin | 22.4% | 7 | Fyzabad | 22.0% |
| 8 | La Brea | 23.3% | 8 | Caroni Central | 24.7% |
| 9 | Lopinot/Bon Air West (renamed Arouca/Lopinot) | 33.8% | 9 | Tabaquite | 36.9% |
| 10 | Tobago West | 34.1% | 10 | St. Augustine | 37.8% |
| 11 | D'Abadie/O'Meara (renamed Malabar/Mausica) | 34.2% | 11 | Couva South | 38.7% |
| 12 | San Fernando East | 35.6% | 12 | Princes Town | 40.6% |
| 13 | Arima | 40.0% | 13 | Couva North | 40.7% |
| 14 | St. Ann's East | 51.1% | 14 | Caroni East | 49.2% |
| 15 | Diego Martin North/East | 53.3% | 15 | Oropouche West | 50.5% |
| 16 | Diego Martin Central | 55.7% | 16 | Siparia | 55.5% |
| 17 | Diego Martin West | 59.1% | 17 | Oropouche East | 60.2% |
| 18 | Port of Spain South | 60.7% | 18 | Naparima | 66.4% |
| 19 | Arouca/Maloney (renamed Trincity/Maloney) | 64.2% | 19 | Chaguanas West | 78.2% |
| 20 | Port of Spain North/St. Ann's West | 66.8% | Safe | | |
| 21 | Laventille East/Morvant | 67.0% | | | |
| 22 | Laventille West | 71.6% | | | |
Safe
Source: Parliamentary Elections, 2020 Final Results – Candidates Vote Count

== Opinion polls ==
The North American Caribbean Teachers Association (NACTA) based in New York (led by political analyst Vishnu Bisram), pollster Nigel Henry's Solution by Simulation and pollster Louis Bertrand's H.H.B (H.H.B) & Associates have commissioned opinion polling for the next general election sampling the electorates' opinions.

=== Seat projections ===
| Date | Pollster | Sample size | PNM | UNC | Other | Legislative majority |
|---|---|---|---|---|---|---|
| 24 Apr 2025 | NACTA publishes a poll with their result being that there is no clear front-runner and that the results will come down to marginal seats. They also concluded that smaller parties, not part of the Coalition of Interests, are unlikely to win any seats. The results concluded that nationwide, the UNC had a slight advantage over the PNM in popular votes. In Tobago they concluded that the PNM is ahead in Tobago West, while Tobago East remains highly competitive. | | | | | |
| 20 Apr 2025 | Guardian Media Limited publishes a poll by Prof. Hamid Ghany in which the UNC is in the lead with 45% of the votes, the PNM with 30%, the PF with 7%, and the NTA with 6% for the marginal seats in Trinidad. For the two seats in Tobago the PNM is leading with 47%, the TPP with 32%, and the PDP with 4%. | | | | | |
| 18 Mar 2025 | The Office of the Prime Minister announces that general elections will be held on April 28th. | | | | | |
| 17 Mar 2025 | Stuart Young is sworn in as Prime Minister of Trinidad and Tobago by President Christine Kangaloo, along with his newly formed cabinet. | | | | | |
| 16 Mar 2025 | Keith Rowley officially resigns from the position of prime minister, remains party leader of PNM. | | | | | |
| 6 Jan 2025 | Prime Minister Keith Rowley announces that PNM MP's voted to select Stuart Young, PNM party chairman and MP for Port-of-Spain North/St. Ann's West, to succeed him as the country's prime minister. | | | | | |
| 3 Jan 2025 | Prime Minister Keith Rowley announces his intention to resign as prime pinister and MP for Diego Martin West. | | | | | |
| 16 December 2024 | Lisa Morris-Julian, the MP for D'Abadie/O'Meara and the 2025 PNM prospective candidate for Malabar/Mausica (the new name for the D'Abadie/O'Meara constituency from the 2025 general election), along with two of her children, die in a fire. | | | | | |
| 9 Sep 2024 | NACTA/Newday | 490 | 25 | 16 | 0 | 5 |
| 9 Sep 2024 | | Five dissident UNC MPs reshuffled in the House of Representatives | | | | |
| 17 Jun 2024 | | 2024 Local Government By-Elections: PNM wins Lengua/Indian Walk, breaking the 2023 Trinidadian local election tie with the UNC for the seat and number of councillors elected islandwide, UNC retains control of Quinam/Morne Diablo | | | | |
| 15 Jun 2024 | | 2024 United National Congress internal election: Opposition Leader Kamla Persad-Bissessar retains leadership of the UNC with 76.47% of the vote. | | | | |
| 14 August 2023 | | PNM ties in number of councillors and corporations won with the UNC in the 2023 Trinidadian local elections | | | | |
| 12 August 2023 | | The Tobago People's Party is formed comprising all ex-PDP Tobago House of Assembly members, besides PDP leader Watson Duke, leaving Duke as the sole PDP member of the THA | | | | |
| 26 Jun 2023 | | UNC and NTA form an alliance to contest the 2023 Trinidadian local elections | | | | |
| 20 Jan 2023 | | 2023 Trinidad and Tobago presidential election; Christine Kangaloo is elected president, succeeding Paula-Mae Weekes | | | | |
| Nov-Dec 2022 | | 2022 People's National Movement leadership election: Prime Minister Keith Rowley retains leadership of the PNM with 92.46% of the vote. | | | | |
| 24 Apr 2022 | | 2022 Tobago Council of the PNM election; Ancil Dennis succeeds Tracy Davidson-Celestine as PNM Tobago leader | | | | |
| 6 Dec 2021 | | January 2021 Tobago House of Assembly election: PDP wins a historic landslide victory, ending 21 consecutive years of PNM rule, Farley Chavez Augustine replaces Ancil Dennis as Chief Secretary of Tobago | | | | |
| 21 Oct 2021 | | UNC motion to impeach President Paula-Mae Weekes fails | | | | |
| 25 Jan 2021 | | PNM and PDP win an equal number of seats in the January 2021 Tobago House of Assembly election | | | | |
| 10 Aug 2020 | 2020 general election | | 22 | 19 | 0 | 3 |

== Results ==
The United National Congress won 26 seats, forming a majority government, with its leader Kamla Persad-Bissessar becoming prime minister for the second time since she was elected leader in 2010. The governing People's National Movement led by former prime minister Keith Rowley and Stuart Young as prime ministerial candidate won 13 seats, losing power, becoming the opposition. The Tobago People's Party led by Tobago House of Assembly Chief Minister Farley Augustine won both Tobago seats.

According to party organiser Barry Padarath, it was the best result for the United National Congress since the party's foundation.

In the aftermath of the election, Young resigned as PNM party chairman on April 30, and Rowley announced his intention to resign as political leader of the PNM on May 1. Kamla Persad-Bissessar and John Jeremie were sworn in as Prime Minister and Attorney General respectively on May 1.

| Party | Votes | % | Seats | +/– |
|---|---|---|---|---|
| United National Congress | 335,161 | 54.04 | 26 | +6 |
| People's National Movement | 224,403 | 36.18 | 13 | –8 |
| Patriotic Front | 21,232 | 3.42 | 0 | New |
| Tobago People's Party | 13,857 | 2.23 | 2 | New |
| Progressive Empowerment Party | 9,379 | 1.51 | 0 | 0 |
| Congress of the People | 6,481 | 1.05 | 0 | 0 |
| National Transformation Alliance | 5,860 | 0.94 | 0 | New |
| Progressive Democratic Patriots | 1,396 | 0.23 | 0 | 0 |
| All People's Party | 655 | 0.11 | 0 | New |
| Movement for National Development | 556 | 0.09 | 0 | 0 |
| New National Vision | 268 | 0.04 | 0 | 0 |
| Innovative Democratic Alliance | 143 | 0.02 | 0 | New |
| Trinidad Humanity Campaign | 84 | 0.01 | 0 | 0 |
| National Coalition for Transformation | 55 | 0.01 | 0 | New |
| Unity of the People | 37 | 0.01 | 0 | New |
| The Hyarima Movement | 24 | 0.00 | 0 | New |
| Class Action Reform Movement | 22 | 0.00 | 0 | New |
| Independent | 563 | 0.09 | 0 | 0 |
| Total | 620,176 | 100.00 | 41 | 0 |
| Valid votes | 620,176 | 99.67 | | |
| Invalid/blank votes | 2,031 | 0.33 | | |
| Total votes | 622,207 | 100.00 | | |
| Registered voters/turnout | 1,153,876 | 53.92 | | |
Source: EBCTT

=== By constituency ===
The Elections and Boundaries Commission (EBC) report of 13 March 2024 on constituency boundary reviews resulted in the renaming of five constituencies: Arouca/Maloney became Trincity/Maloney, D'Abadie/O'Meara became Malabar/Mausica, Lopinot/Bon Air West became Arouca/Lopinot, St Joseph became Aranguez/St Joseph, and Pointe-à-Pierre became Claxton Bay. The report also recommended maintaining the current total of 41 constituencies, with 39 seats in Trinidad and two in Tobago.

Lisa Morris-Julian, Minister in the Ministry of Education and Member of Parliament for D'Abadie/O'Meara (renamed Malabar/Mausica from this election), was re-selected by the PNM as the candidate for the seat on 3 December 2024. However, she died in a house fire on 16 December 2024.

| Electoral District | Electorate | Candidate | Party | Votes | % |
|---|---|---|---|---|---|
| Aranguez/St. Joseph | 28,873 | Devesh Maharaj | United National Congress | 9,908 | 57.14 |
| Aranguez/St. Joseph | 28,873 | Terrence Deyalsingh | People's National Movement | 6,672 | 38.48 |
| Aranguez/St. Joseph | 28,873 | Anthony Darryl Dolland | Patriotic Front | 350 | 2.02 |
| Aranguez/St. Joseph | 28,873 | Gary Griffith | National Transformation Alliance | 334 | 1.93 |
| Aranguez/St. Joseph | 28,873 | Marcus Ramkissoon | Trinidad Humanity Campaign | 27 | 0.16 |
| Aranguez/St. Joseph | 28,873 | Rejected | | 48 | 0.28 |
| Arima | 28,802 | Pennelope Beckles | People's National Movement | 7,055 | 49.80 |
| Arima | 28,802 | Nigel Moses | United National Congress | 6,356 | 44.86 |
| Arima | 28,802 | Jemima Lezama-Redhead | Patriotic Front | 520 | 3.67 |
| Arima | 28,802 | Shekhina Sirju | National Transformation Alliance | 152 | 1.07 |
| Arima | 28,802 | Nalini Dial | National Coalition for Transformation | 38 | 0.27 |
| Arima | 28,802 | Rejected | | 46 | 0.32 |
| Arouca/Lopinot | 28,493 | Marvin Gonzales | People's National Movement | 7,958 | 48.58 |
| Arouca/Lopinot | 28,493 | Natalie Chaitan-Maharaj | United National Congress | 7,699 | 47.00 |
| Arouca/Lopinot | 28,493 | Kenny Nicholas Lee | Patriotic Front | 537 | 3.28 |
| Arouca/Lopinot | 28,493 | Nicolene Taylor-Chinchamee | National Transformation Alliance | 146 | 0.89 |
| Arouca/Lopinot | 28,493 | Rejected | | 41 | 0.25 |
| Barataria/San Juan | 25,183 | Saddam Hosein | United National Congress | 8,887 | 62.74 |
| Barataria/San Juan | 25,183 | Muhammad Yunus Ibrahim | People's National Movement | 4,742 | 33.48 |
| Barataria/San Juan | 25,183 | Steffon Boodooram | Patriotic Front | 365 | 2.58 |
| Barataria/San Juan | 25,183 | Da Vvian Bain | National Transformation Alliance | 97 | 0.68 |
| Barataria/San Juan | 25,183 | Joshua Faline | All People's Party | 37 | 0.26 |
| Barataria/San Juan | 25,183 | Rejected | | 36 | 0.25 |
| Caroni Central | 31,460 | David Lee | United National Congress | 12,663 | 68.53 |
| Caroni Central | 31,460 | Adam Hosein | People's National Movement | 4,854 | 26.27 |
| Caroni Central | 31,460 | Andrew Hosein | Patriotic Front | 914 | 4.95 |
| Caroni Central | 31,460 | Rejected | | 46 | 0.25 |
| Caroni East | 30,208 | Rishad Seecheran | United National Congress | 13,957 | 80.61 |
| Caroni East | 30,208 | Leena Rampersad | People's National Movement | 2,757 | 15.92 |
| Caroni East | 30,208 | Danielle Grell | Patriotic Front | 561 | 3.24 |
| Caroni East | 30,208 | Rejected | | 40 | 0.23 |
| Chaguanas East | 27,728 | Vandana Mohit | United National Congress | 10,097 | 62.68 |
| Chaguanas East | 27,728 | Richie Sookhai | People's National Movement | 5,317 | 33.00 |
| Chaguanas East | 27,728 | Afifah Mohammed | Patriotic Front | 487 | 3.02 |
| Chaguanas East | 27,728 | Norman Dindial | National Transformation Alliance | 125 | 0.78 |
| Chaguanas East | 27,728 | Ernesto Singh | Independent | 47 | 0.29 |
| Chaguanas East | 27,728 | Rejected | | 37 | 0.23 |
| Chaguanas West | 29,043 | Colin Neil Gosine | United National Congress | 16,013 | 88.73 |
| Chaguanas West | 29,043 | Winston Mahabir | People's National Movement | 1,390 | 7.70 |
| Chaguanas West | 29,043 | Marsha George | Patriotic Front | 599 | 3.32 |
| Chaguanas West | 29,043 | Rejected | | 44 | 0.24 |
| Claxton Bay | 26,078 | Hansen Narinesingh | United National Congress | 9,969 | 64.45 |
| Claxton Bay | 26,078 | Mukesh Ramsingh | People's National Movement | 4,934 | 31.90 |
| Claxton Bay | 26,078 | Thelston Jagoo | Patriotic Front | 530 | 3.43 |
| Claxton Bay | 26,078 | Rejected | | 34 | 0.22 |
| Couva North | 30,681 | Jearlean John | United National Congress | 13,201 | 73.08 |
| Couva North | 30,681 | Brent Maraj | People's National Movement | 3,094 | 17.13 |
| Couva North | 30,681 | Mickela Panday | Patriotic Front | 1,727 | 9.56 |
| Couva North | 30,681 | Rejected | | 42 | 0.23 |
| Couva South | 30,975 | Barry Padarath | United National Congress | 13,122 | 73.39 |
| Couva South | 30,975 | Aaron Mohammed | People's National Movement | 3,763 | 21.04 |
| Couva South | 30,975 | Imran Gokool | Patriotic Front | 955 | 5.34 |
| Couva South | 30,975 | Rejected | | 41 | 0.23 |
| Cumuto/Manzanilla | 30,776 | Shivanna Sam | United National Congress | 12,559 | 68.08 |
| Cumuto/Manzanilla | 30,776 | Sanjiv Boodhu | People's National Movement | 5,393 | 29.24 |
| Cumuto/Manzanilla | 30,776 | Valene Teelucksingh | Patriotic Front | 438 | 2.37 |
| Cumuto/Manzanilla | 30,776 | Rejected | | 57 | 0.31 |
| Diego Martin Central | 29,623 | Symon de Nobriga | People's National Movement | 7,409 | 56.35 |
| Diego Martin Central | 29,623 | Keron Thomas | United National Congress | 4,600 | 34.98 |
| Diego Martin Central | 29,623 | Russel Chan | National Transformation Alliance | 1,085 | 8.25 |
| Diego Martin Central | 29,623 | Rejected | | 55 | 0.42 |
| Diego Martin North/East | 29,869 | Colm Imbert | People's National Movement | 7,064 | 56.01 |
| Diego Martin North/East | 29,869 | Brendon Butts | Progressive Empowerment Party | 3,525 | 27.95 |
| Diego Martin North/East | 29,869 | Chelsie Cedeno | Patriotic Front | 708 | 5.61 |
| Diego Martin North/East | 29,869 | Salim George | National Transformation Alliance | 565 | 4.48 |
| Diego Martin North/East | 29,869 | Garvin Nicholas | Movement for National Development | 556 | 4.41 |
| Diego Martin North/East | 29,869 | Christine Soden | All People's Party | 145 | 1.15 |
| Diego Martin North/East | 29,869 | Rejected | | 49 | 0.39 |
| Diego Martin West | 29,967 | Hans des Vignes | People's National Movement | 7,703 | 62.33 |
| Diego Martin West | 29,967 | Janice Learmond-Criqui | Progressive Empowerment Party | 3,257 | 26.36 |
| Diego Martin West | 29,967 | Marsha Walker | National Transformation Alliance | 1,336 | 10.81 |
| Diego Martin West | 29,967 | Rejected | | 62 | 0.50 |
| Fyzabad | 27,471 | Davendranath Tancoo | United National Congress | 11,396 | 69.39 |
| Fyzabad | 27,471 | Kheron Khan | People's National Movement | 4,454 | 27.12 |
| Fyzabad | 27,471 | Naomi Gopeesingh | Patriotic Front | 539 | 3.28 |
| Fyzabad | 27,471 | Rejected | | 33 | 0.20 |
| La Brea | 26,616 | Clyde Elder | United National Congress | 7,001 | 50.64 |
| La Brea | 26,616 | Randall Mitchell | People's National Movement | 6,262 | 45.30 |
| La Brea | 26,616 | Carla Garcia | Patriotic Front | 413 | 2.99 |
| La Brea | 26,616 | Renision Jeffrey | All People's Party | 53 | 0.38 |
| La Brea | 26,616 | Francis Morean | The Hyarima Movement | 24 | 0.17 |
| La Brea | 26,616 | Rejected | | 71 | 0.51 |
| La Horquetta/Talparo | 29,061 | Phillip Watts | United National Congress | 9,585 | 56.52 |
| La Horquetta/Talparo | 29,061 | Foster Cummings | People's National Movement | 6,712 | 39.58 |
| La Horquetta/Talparo | 29,061 | Rekeisha Francois | Patriotic Front | 502 | 2.96 |
| La Horquetta/Talparo | 29,061 | Alvin Cudjoe | National Transformation Alliance | 107 | 0.63 |
| La Horquetta/Talparo | 29,061 | Rejected | | 54 | 0.32 |
| Laventille East/Morvant | 25,231 | Christian Birchwood | People's National Movement | 5,837 | 59.68 |
| Laventille East/Morvant | 25,231 | Robert Mitchell | United National Congress | 3,270 | 33.43 |
| Laventille East/Morvant | 25,231 | Christopher Alexander | Patriotic Front | 577 | 5.90 |
| Laventille East/Morvant | 25,231 | Steve Stephens | All People's Party | 75 | 0.77 |
| Laventille East/Morvant | 25,231 | Rejected | | 22 | 0.22 |
| Laventille West | 25,147 | Kareem Marcelle | People's National Movement | 6,096 | 68.87 |
| Laventille West | 25,147 | Rodney Stowe | United National Congress | 2,291 | 25.88 |
| Laventille West | 25,147 | Nathaniel Thomas | Patriotic Front | 429 | 4.85 |
| Laventille West | 25,147 | Rejected | | 36 | 0.41 |
| Malabar/Mausica | 29,515 | Dominic Romain | People's National Movement | 7,691 | 48.04 |
| Malabar/Mausica | 29,515 | Dominic Smith | United National Congress | 7,437 | 46.46 |
| Malabar/Mausica | 29,515 | Anita Margaret Hankey | Patriotic Front | 834 | 5.21 |
| Malabar/Mausica | 29,515 | Rejected | | 46 | 0.29 |
| Mayaro | 29,346 | Nicholas Morris | United National Congress | 11,241 | 70.12 |
| Mayaro | 29,346 | Beatrice Bridglal | People's National Movement | 4,381 | 27.33 |
| Mayaro | 29,346 | Brittney Williams | Patriotic Front | 347 | 2.16 |
| Mayaro | 29,346 | Rejected | | 61 | 0.38 |
| Moruga/Tableland | 29,744 | Michelle Benjamin | United National Congress | 11,083 | 56.99 |
| Moruga/Tableland | 29,744 | Lisa Atwater | People's National Movement | 7,983 | 41.05 |
| Moruga/Tableland | 29,744 | Trivet Phillip | Patriotic Front | 281 | 1.44 |
| Moruga/Tableland | 29,744 | Rejected | | 101 | 0.52 |
| Naparima | 27,150 | Narindra Roopnarine | United National Congress | 13,649 | 86.39 |
| Naparima | 27,150 | Sarah Nangoo | People's National Movement | 1,650 | 10.44 |
| Naparima | 27,150 | Fariyal Mohammed-Lalchan | Patriotic Front | 462 | 2.92 |
| Naparima | 27,150 | Rejected | | 38 | 0.24 |
| Oropouche East | 28,092 | Roodal Moonilal | United National Congress | 13,649 | 81.53 |
| Oropouche East | 28,092 | Richard Ragbir | People's National Movement | 2,264 | 13.52 |
| Oropouche East | 28,092 | Danny Jadoonan | Patriotic Front | 771 | 4.61 |
| Oropouche East | 28,092 | Rejected | | 58 | 0.35 |
| Oropouche West | 25,429 | Lackram Bodoe | United National Congress | 11,882 | 80.64 |
| Oropouche West | 25,429 | Shawn Dube | People's National Movement | 2,349 | 15.94 |
| Oropouche West | 25,429 | Alisha Mohammed | Patriotic Front | 451 | 3.06 |
| Oropouche West | 25,429 | Rejected | | 52 | 0.35 |
| Point Fortin | 26,470 | Ernesto Kesar | United National Congress | 7,293 | 51.54 |
| Point Fortin | 26,470 | Kennedy Richards | People's National Movement | 6,509 | 46.00 |
| Point Fortin | 26,470 | Errol Fabien | National Transformation Alliance | 203 | 1.43 |
| Point Fortin | 26,470 | Sheldon Khan | All People's Party | 81 | 0.57 |
| Point Fortin | 26,470 | Rejected | | 65 | 0.46 |
| Port-of-Spain North/St. Ann's West | 25,670 | Stuart Young | People's National Movement | 7,243 | 67.01 |
| Port-of-Spain North/St. Ann's West | 25,670 | Phillip Alexander | Progressive Empowerment Party | 2,597 | 24.03 |
| Port-of-Spain North/St. Ann's West | 25,670 | Vivian Johnson | Independent | 478 | 4.42 |
| Port-of-Spain North/St. Ann's West | 25,670 | Richard Thomas | National Transformation Alliance | 443 | 4.10 |
| Port-of-Spain North/St. Ann's West | 25,670 | Rejected | | 48 | 0.44 |
| Port-of-Spain South | 25,534 | Keith Scotland | People's National Movement | 5,523 | 59.93 |
| Port-of-Spain South | 25,534 | Kirt Sinnette | Congress of the People | 2,218 | 24.07 |
| Port-of-Spain South | 25,534 | Winzy Adams | Patriotic Front | 670 | 7.27 |
| Port-of-Spain South | 25,534 | Gail Gonsalves-Castanada | National Transformation Alliance | 352 | 3.82 |
| Port-of-Spain South | 25,534 | Fuad Abu Bakr | New National Vision | 268 | 2.91 |
| Port-of-Spain South | 25,534 | Kezel Jackson | All People's Party | 149 | 1.62 |
| Port-of-Spain South | 25,534 | Rejected | | 35 | 0.38 |
| Princes Town | 27,774 | Aiyna Ali | United National Congress | 11,852 | 75.25 |
| Princes Town | 27,774 | Rocklyn Mohammed | People's National Movement | 3,340 | 21.21 |
| Princes Town | 27,774 | Sacha Mangroo | Patriotic Front | 510 | 3.24 |
| Princes Town | 27,774 | Rejected | | 49 | 0.31 |
| San Fernando East | 25,667 | Brian Manning | People's National Movement | 7,017 | 50.38 |
| San Fernando East | 25,667 | John Michael Alibocas | United National Congress | 6,344 | 45.55 |
| San Fernando East | 25,667 | Kenrick Serrette | Patriotic Front | 502 | 3.60 |
| San Fernando East | 25,667 | Rejected | | 64 | 0.46 |
| San Fernando West | 25,378 | Michael Dowlath | United National Congress | 7,341 | 50.34 |
| San Fernando West | 25,378 | Faris Al-Rawi | People's National Movement | 6,638 | 45.52 |
| San Fernando West | 25,378 | Nnika Ramnanan | Patriotic Front | 450 | 3.09 |
| San Fernando West | 25,378 | Kevin Sarran | National Transformation Alliance | 44 | 0.30 |
| San Fernando West | 25,378 | Denile Joseph | All People's Party | 28 | 0.19 |
| San Fernando West | 25,378 | Kathryna Browne | National Coalition for Transformation | 17 | 0.12 |
| San Fernando West | 25,378 | Rejected | | 65 | 0.45 |
| Siparia | 29,096 | Kamla Persad-Bissessar | United National Congress | 13,900 | 83.03 |
| Siparia | 29,096 | Natasha Mohammed | People's National Movement | 2,412 | 14.41 |
| Siparia | 29,096 | Judy Sookdeo | Patriotic Front | 374 | 2.23 |
| Siparia | 29,096 | Rejected | | 54 | 0.32 |
| St. Ann's East | 30,113 | Nyan Gadsby-Dolly | People's National Movement | 7,472 | 55.34 |
| St. Ann's East | 30,113 | Gerrard Small | Congress of the People | 4,263 | 31.57 |
| St. Ann's East | 30,113 | Kerron Brathwaite | Patriotic Front | 1,242 | 9.20 |
| St. Ann's East | 30,113 | Jason Reece-Roper | National Transformation Alliance | 472 | 3.50 |
| St. Ann's East | 30,113 | Rejected | | 53 | 0.39 |
| St. Augustine | 28,397 | Khadijah Ameen | United National Congress | 12,664 | 73.59 |
| St. Augustine | 28,397 | Renuka Sagramsingh-Sooklal | People's National Movement | 3,865 | 22.46 |
| St. Augustine | 28,397 | Daniel Maharaj | Patriotic Front | 481 | 2.80 |
| St. Augustine | 28,397 | Vera Dookie-Ramlal | National Transformation Alliance | 129 | 0.75 |
| St. Augustine | 28,397 | Christopher Mathura | Trinidad Humanity Campaign | 29 | 0.17 |
| St. Augustine | 28,397 | Rejected | | 41 | 0.24 |
| Tabaquite | 28,876 | Sean Sobers | United National Congress | 11,615 | 73.68 |
| Tabaquite | 28,876 | Marisha Alvarado | People's National Movement | 3,436 | 21.80 |
| Tabaquite | 28,876 | Amzad Mohammed | Patriotic Front | 668 | 4.24 |
| Tabaquite | 28,876 | Rejected | | 46 | 0.29 |
| Tobago East | 23,853 | David Thomas | Tobago People's Party | 7,144 | 56.96 |
| Tobago East | 23,853 | Ayanna Webster-Roy | People's National Movement | 4,396 | 35.05 |
| Tobago East | 23,853 | Watson Duke | Progressive Democratic Patriots | 788 | 6.28 |
| Tobago East | 23,853 | Wade Caruth | Patriotic Front | 99 | 0.79 |
| Tobago East | 23,853 | Gerard Balfour | Innovative Democratic Alliance | 82 | 0.65 |
| Tobago East | 23,853 | Rejected | | 33 | 0.26 |
| Tobago West | 28,863 | Joel Sampson | Tobago People's Party | 6,713 | 46.69 |
| Tobago West | 28,863 | Shamfa Cudjoe | People's National Movement | 6,604 | 45.93 |
| Tobago West | 28,863 | Curtis Douglas | Progressive Democratic Patriots | 608 | 4.23 |
| Tobago West | 28,863 | Aretha Paula Clarke | Patriotic Front | 154 | 1.07 |
| Tobago West | 28,863 | Dexter James | All People's Party | 87 | 0.61 |
| Tobago West | 28,863 | Kay Trotman | Innovative Democratic Alliance | 61 | 0.42 |
| Tobago West | 28,863 | Leroy George | Independent | 38 | 0.26 |
| Tobago West | 28,863 | Nickosy Phillips | Unity of the People | 37 | 0.26 |
| Tobago West | 28,863 | Ricardo Phillip | Class Action Reform Movement | 22 | 0.15 |
| Tobago West | 28,863 | Rejected | | 55 | 0.38 |
| Toco/Sangre Grande | 31,186 | Wayne Sturge | United National Congress | 9,728 | 54.99 |
| Toco/Sangre Grande | 31,186 | Roger Monroe | People's National Movement | 7,363 | 41.62 |
| Toco/Sangre Grande | 31,186 | Elizabeth Wharton | Patriotic Front | 385 | 2.18 |
| Toco/Sangre Grande | 31,186 | Christine Newallo-Hosein | National Transformation Alliance | 143 | 0.81 |
| Toco/Sangre Grande | 31,186 | Rejected | | 72 | 0.41 |
| Trincity/Maloney | 28,953 | Camille Robinson-Regis | People's National Movement | 9,858 | 64.22 |
| Trincity/Maloney | 28,953 | Richard Smith | United National Congress | 4,443 | 28.94 |
| Trincity/Maloney | 28,953 | Jamel Hunte | Patriotic Front | 987 | 6.43 |
| Trincity/Maloney | 28,953 | Rejected | | 62 | 0.40 |
| Tunapuna | 27,485 | Roger Alexander | United National Congress | 8,466 | 52.86 |
| Tunapuna | 27,485 | Esmond Forde | People's National Movement | 6,943 | 43.35 |
| Tunapuna | 27,485 | Aleksei Henry | Patriotic Front | 413 | 2.58 |
| Tunapuna | 27,485 | Savita Pierre | National Transformation Alliance | 127 | 0.79 |
| Tunapuna | 27,485 | Leshawn Gopee | Trinidad Humanity Campaign | 28 | 0.17 |
| Tunapuna | 27,485 | Rejected | | 39 | 0.24 |

== Aftermath ==
The UNC, led by former prime minister Kamla Persad-Bissessar, won a majority of seats, after 10 years as opposition. She was sworn in as prime minister on 1 May. Some analysts cited the UNC's victory as voters' rejection of Rowley and his maneuver of appointing Young without the voters' approval. Hamid Ghany, a political analyst at the University of the West Indies suggested that there would be a different response from the Trump administration due to Persad-Bissessar's favourable disposition towards Trump compared to the PNM's closeness towards Maduro's administration in Venezuela.

The former leader of the PNM, Keith Rowley, conceded defeat on behalf of his party that night. Stuart Young, with a tenure of 43 days, became the shortest-serving prime minister in the country's history. The PNM lost in their safe seats of La Brea, Point Fortin and on the island of Tobago.

A CARICOM delegation congratulated Persad-Bissessar stating: "We look forward to welcoming Prime Minister-elect Persad-Bissessar to the Conference of Heads of Government, and to her participation, as we continue to tackle emerging geopolitical issues, and seek to further improve the welfare and well-being of the people of the region." Among the leaders congratulating Persad-Bissessar included the Prime Minister of Dominica, Roosevelt Skerrit, and the Prime Minister of Barbados, Mia Mottley.

== See also ==
- Persad-Bissessar administration (2025–)
