= Patriotic Front (Trinidad and Tobago) =

Political party in Trinidad and Tobago

- Leader: Mickela Panday
- Founder: Mickela Panday
- Founded: 25 May 2019
- Split from: United National Congress
- Ideology: Left-wing nationalism Economic nationalism Anti-colonialism; Environmentalism
- Political position: Centre-left to left-wing
- Colors: Red-white-black
- House of Representatives: 0 / 41
- Regional municipalities: 0 / 137
- Regional corporations: 0 / 14
- Tobago House of Assembly: 0 / 12

Election symbol
- Heart

Website
- https://thepatrioticfront.com/

The Patriotic Front (PF, colloquially known as "The Patriots") is a political party in Trinidad and Tobago. The party was founded on May 25, 2019 by former UNC member of parliament Mickela Panday, daughter of Basdeo Panday, to contest the 2020 Trinidad and Tobago general election. The Patriots currently do not hold any seats in the House of Representatives, Regional municipalities, Regional corporations or in the Tobago House of Assembly.

== History ==
=== Founding ===
The Patriotic Front was founded on 25 May 2019 by Mickela Panday, splitting from the larger United National Congress after her departure from the party. After a gathering of family and supporters on 20 May 2018, Panday was given the go-ahead to form a new party. The date of the launch also coincided with the 86th birthday of her father, Basdeo Panday.

At that point in time, the junior Panday had not yet announced plans to form any manner of coalition, but said she was open to dialogue with those willing. The design of the logo was done by the former Minister of Housing and Settlements from the UNC, John Humphrey.

Initially, the Patriotic Front planned to contest the 2020 Trinidad and Tobago general election, with Basdeo Panday as campaign manager, but withdrew their initiative due to insufficient time for preparation.

=== 2025 Trinidad and Tobago General Election ===
The Patriotic Front was set to contest all 41 constituencies in the upcoming 2025 general election, with Panday reaffirming her commitment to giving voters an alternative to the two dominant political parties. Panday herself was set to contest the seat of Couva North, which her father had previously represented. However, the PF had only been able to contest 37 seats, claiming that there was targeted harassment by 'high-ranking members of the Government and the Opposition," towards four of their prospective candidates, forcing them to withdraw prior to Nomination Day.

Despite this, the remaining 37 candidates had gone on to contest seats in the election to varying degrees of success, and the Patriotic Front wholly had amassed 21,010 votes, becoming the largest party by number of votes to not have a seat in Parliament.

The candidates for 2025 were as follows:

- Aranguez St. Joseph – Anthony Dolland
- Arima – Jemima Lezama
- Arouca/Lopinot – Kenny Lee
- Barataria/San Juan – Steffon Boodooram
- Caroni Central – Andrew Hosein
- Caroni East – Danielle Grell
- Chaguanas East – Afifah Mohammed
- Chaguanas West – Marsha George
- Claxton Bay – Thelston Jagoo
- Couva North – Mickela Panday
- Couva South – Imran Gokool
- Cumuto Manzanilla – Valene Teelucksingh
- Diego Martin North East – Chelsie Cedeno
- Fyzabad – Dr. Naomi Gopeesingh
- La Brea – Carla Garcia
- La Horquetta/Talparo – Dr. Rekeisha Francois
- Laventille East/Morvant – Christopher Alexander
- Laventille West – Nathaniel Thomas
- Malabar/Mausica – Anita Hankey
- Mayaro – Brittney Williams
- Moruga/Tableland – Trivet Phillip
- Naparima – Fariyal Mohammed
- Oropouche East – Danny Jadoonanan
- Oropouche West – Alisha Mohammed
- Port of Spain South – Dr. Winzy Adams
- Princes Town – Sacha Mangaroo
- San Fernando East – Kenrick Serrette
- San Fernando West – Nnika Ramnanan
- Siparia – Judy Sookdeo
- St. Ann's East – Kerron Brathwaite
- St. Augustine – Daniel Maharaj
- Tabaquite – Amzad Mohammed
- Tobago East – Aretha Clarke
- Tobago West – Wade Caruth
- Toco/Sangre Grande – Elizabeth Wharton
- Trincity/Maloney – Jamal Hunte
- Tunapuna – Aleksei Henry

== Criticism and Responses ==
On April 6, 2025, the Centre of Excellence in Macoya, Leader of the Opposition at the time, Kamla Persad-Bissessar, claimed to have 'purged the politics of caste, class, nepotism, family connections, segregation, discrimination and dynasty from the UNC' as well as claiming to have 'transformed the party from a one-man show and a hereditary aristocracy into a meritocracy,' sparking the idea that these were criticisms levied at the dominance Basdeo Panday and his family had held over the party. Individual critics also claimed that the newly formed Patriotic Front was being funded by the People's National Movement as a way to split votes in the 2025 general election.

Political leader Mickela Panday defended against these allegations at a meeting at the Macaulay Community Centre in Claxton Bay on April 13, expressing her willingness to open the accounts of the party as proof, adding that the 'stress of PNM persecution,' her father having been the leader of their opposite number, still had a toll on her mother, and that she believes that the party should be 'ashamed of themselves'.

== Election results ==
Election	Party leader	Votes			Seats		Position	Government
Election	Party leader	No.	%	±	No.	±	Position	Government
2025	Mickela Panday	21,010	3.42%	—	0 / 41	—	3rd	Extra-parliamentary
