= United National Congress =

- Abbreviation: UNC; UNCTT (internationally)
- Leader: Kamla Persad-Bissessar
- Chairman: Davendranath Tancoo
- General Secretary: Peter Kanhai
- Presidium: National Executive (NATEX)
- Deputy Leaders: Roodal Moonilal; Jearlean K. John; David A. Lee
- Vice Chairwoman: Khadijah Ameen
- Leader in the Senate: Wade Mark (Senate President)
- Leader in the House of Representatives: Kamla Persad-Bissessar (Prime Minister)
- Founder: Basdeo Panday
- Founded: 30 April 1989
- Split from: NAR
- Preceded by: 18 parties: PDP (1953–1957); TLP (1934–1957); POPPG (1950–1957); BP (1936–1966); DLP (1957–1972); LP (1966); UDLP (1972–1976); DLP (1971); SIP (1965–1966); SDLP (1972–1976); WINP (1974–1976); WFP (1965–1966); ULF (1976–1986); THM (1976–1986); ONR (1973–1986); DAC (1971–1986; 2005–2009); NAR (1986–2005); CLUB '88 (1988–1989)
- Headquarters: 5 Mulchan Seuchan Road, Chaguanas, Trinidad and Tobago
- Newspaper: The Checklist.
- Youth wing: UNC Youth Arm
- Women's wing: UNC Women’s Arm
- Affiliated Trade Union: All Trinidad General Workers' Trade Union (de facto); Oilfields Workers' Trade Union; Public Services Association
- Membership (2020): 120,000+
- Ideology: Social democracy Labourism; Civic Nationalism; Multiculturalism; Third Way; Populism
- Political position: Centre-left
- Regional affiliation: Christian Democrat Organization of America
- Colors: Yellow
- Slogan: When UNC wins, everybody wins
- Political coalition: UNC/NAR (1995–2000); People's Partnership (2010–2015); UNC/NTA/MND (2023); Coalition of Interests (2025)
- Senate: 16 / 31
- House of Representatives: 26 / 41
- Tobago House of Assembly: 0 / 15 (Does not contest)
- Regional corporations: 7 / 14
- Regional municipalities: 70 / 141
- Indirectly elected mayors: 2 / 7
- Indirectly elected Aldermen: 29 / 56

Election symbol
- Sun rising above the Trinity Hills

Party flag
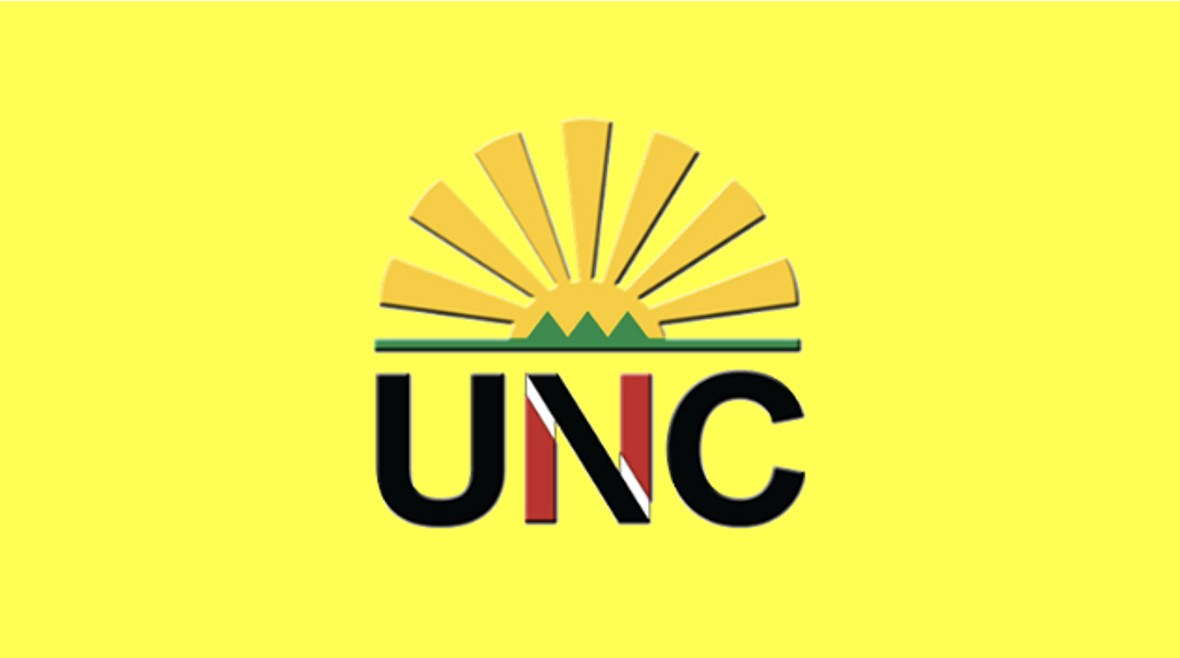

Website
- www.uncwins.org

The United National Congress (UNC or internationally UNCTT) is one of two major political parties in Trinidad and Tobago. The UNC is a centre-left party. It was founded in 1989 by Basdeo Panday, a British-educated lawyer, economist, trade unionist, and actor, after a split in the ruling National Alliance for Reconstruction (NAR). After spending six years in opposition, the UNC won control of the government in the historic 1995 election with Panday becoming the nation's first Indo-Trinidadian prime minister. They were initially in coalition with the NAR and later on their own. In the 2000 general election, the UNC won an absolute majority in the Parliament. In 2001, a split in the party caused the UNC to lose its parliamentary majority and control of the government. From 2001 to 2010, the UNC was once again Parliamentary Opposition party. In May 2010, the UNC returned to government as the majority party in the People's Partnership. The UNC's Political Leader, Kamla Persad-Bissessar, was sworn in as the first female Prime Minister of Trinidad and Tobago. Kamla Persad-Bissessar was Prime Minister from 2010 until 2015 and then again from 2025 to present after they won that year's general elections.

The party symbol is the sun rising above the Trinity Hills. Historically, the UNC has been supported by a majority of Indo-Trinidadians and Tobagonians, especially Presbyterian and Hindu Indo-Trinidadian and Tobagonians, thus it is colloquially called the Indian Party or the Hindu Party. The Spiritual Baptist and other racial and religious minorities of the country also support the party.

In power since the 2025 general election, the party holds 26 out of 41 Members of Parliament in the House of Representatives and 16 out of 31 members of the Senate, as mandated by the Constitution of Trinidad and Tobago to the largest party in the lower house. The party has 70 out of the 141 local Councillors and is in control of 7 of the 14 regional corporations since the 2023 Trinidadian local elections. The party has no representation in the Tobago House of Assembly.

As of December 2020, the UNC has 120,000+ registered members.

== History ==
=== Opposition party (1989–1995) ===
The party was founded on 30 April 1989 following a split in the ruling NAR. Six members of parliament, all of whom were former members of the United Labour Front, left the NAR to form the Caucus for Love, Unity and Brotherhood 1988 (CLUB '88) which was chaired by Rampersad Parasram. CLUB '88 evolved into the UNC with Panday as leader and Parasram as its first chairman.

The UNC won 13 seats in the 1991 general election and became the official opposition. It won a 14th seat in a by-election and gained another in 1995 when Ralph Maraj defected from the ruling People's National Movement (PNM) party. In 1995, the UNC lost one seat when Hulsie Bhaggan, member of parliament for Chaguanas, left the party to form the Movement for Unity and Progress (MUP).

=== Governing party (1995–2001) ===
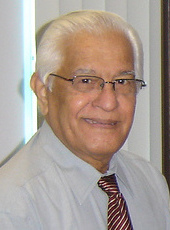
Basdeo Panday, the fifth Prime Minister of Trinidad and Tobago (1995–2001) and first leader of the United National Congress

In the 1995 general election, the UNC won 17 of 36 seats and formed a coalition government with the NAR which won 2 seats. In exchange for his support, NAR Political Leader A. N. R. Robinson was first appointed Minister Extraordinaire and then elected President in 1997. Two PNM MPs defected and supported the UNC as independent members. This gave the UNC an absolute majority and caused relations with the NAR to deteriorate.

In the 2000 general election, the UNC won 19 seats and formed a majority government. However, internal party elections in 2001 exposed a rift in the party between Panday and Attorney-General Ramesh Maharaj, who fielded rival slates. Maharaj's slate termed itself 'Team Unity'. Though Panday was not challenged as Political Leader, Maharaj's slate won 21 of the 24 executive posts, and Maharaj himself was elected Deputy Leader.

Panday refused to recommend Maharaj as Acting Prime Minister in his absence. Maharaj countered by initiating investigations into charges of corruption by Panday and his supporters. Panday then reduced the ministerial portfolios of Maharaj and his supporters. This led to the defection of Maharaj; two of his supporters, Agriculture Minister Trevor Sudama and Information Technology Minister Ralph Maraj, formed a new political party: Team Unity. Early elections were called in 2001, in which the UNC was reduced to 18 seats in the House of Representatives. The opposition PNM, which also won 18 seats, was called upon to form the government.

=== Return to opposition (2001–2010) ===
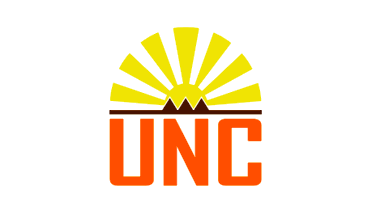
Former logo of the UNC.

==== 2002 general election ====
During the 2002 general elections, the UNC won 46.5% of the popular vote and 16 out of 36 seats in the House of Representatives. It became the opposition party to the ruling PNM government, which held the other 20 seats.

==== Party infighting ====
In April 2005, the UNC was further weakened when Pointe-à-Pierre MP Gillian Lucky and San Juan MP Fuad Khan declared themselves to be "independent UNC members" and relocated to the Opposition backbenches. On 31 May 2005, Panday, his wife Oma, former UNC MP Carlos John, and party financier Ishwar Galbaransingh were arrested for bribery. Panday refused bail and remained in prison for eight days.

On 2 September 2005, Panday announced that he would be willing to hand over party leadership to Winston Dookeran, MP for St. Augustine, if Panday could remain party chairman. As a result of negotiations between the two, Dookeran was nominated unopposed for the post of Political Leader and Panday was nominated unopposed for the party Chairmanship. However, both fielded rival slates for the remaining 16 executive posts.

On 2 October, Panday's slate won 12 of the posts including two of the three deputy leader positions and, after a recount, the vice-chairmanship. Dookeran's slate won the 4 remaining posts. Members of Dookeran's slate called for Panday's resignation as Leader of the Opposition. Gerald Yetming, MP for St. Joseph, joined the Opposition backbenches in protest of Panday's refusal to relinquish his position.

In February 2006, Panday announced that he had reconciled with Maharaj, who marked his return to the party by speaking at a party rally held at Mid-Centre Mall in Chaguanas on 19 February. At that rally, Dookeran criticized his party for accepting Maharaj's return and was booed by the crowd.

On 8 March 2006, Yetming announced he was formally leaving the UNC and would serve out his term as an independent. His chief reason was the return of Maharaj to the UNC, a move which he opposed.

As internal wranglings continued in the party, it appeared that a rift between Dookeran and the Executive was deepening. Newspaper accounts indicated that pro-Panday executives and Dookeran were largely functioning independently of each other. Dookeran also suffered a loss of support as Deputy Leader Jack Warner and Roodal Moonilal, MP for Oropouche, announced their support of Panday.

On February 10, Panday fired Senator Robin Montano as an opposition senator. Montano had supported Dookeran and opposed the return of Maharaj to the UNC.

On 24 April, Panday was convicted of fraud for failing to disclose a bank account under the rules of the Integrity Act. He was sentenced to 2 years hard labour. At the UNC rally held that night Dookeran was not permitted to speak on the platform. Maharaj, however was seated centre stage at that rally.

On 25 April, Panday's appointment as Opposition Leader was revoked by President George Maxwell Richards. In a surprise move the next day, seven UNC MPs announced their support of Deputy Political Leader Kamla Persad-Bissessar as the new Opposition Leader. Persad-Bissessar was appointed Opposition Leader the following day but stated that she would step aside should Panday's appeal prove successful.

The Courts released Panday on bail on Friday 28 April, on the ground of his medical ailments. Following his release on bail, he tendered his resignation as chairman of the party on 1 May 2006. The UNC executive did not immediately accept his resignation.

==== Resignation of Dookeran and return of Panday ====
In the months following, infighting in the UNC increased. Dookeran and the party Executive were entrenched in opposing positions. Dookeran organised his own political apparatus and held political meetings without the Executive's consent. He also ceased to attend Executive meetings and his few allies on the Executive were removed. Persad-Bissessar also replaced Dookeran's supporters in the appointed Senate.

Amidst the infighting, Panday returned to active politics in August 2006 and attempted to publicly broker a reconciliation between the two factions. This proved fruitless. Many, including Panday's supporters, privately held the view that Panday was working behind the scenes to undermine Dookeran's support within the Executive. Dookeran, who was seen as the legitimate Political Leader of the UNC, was unable to exercise the full powers granted to him in the Party's Constitution. However, Dookeran's call for internal change within the UNC was negatively viewed by some of the party's 'old guards' who felt their position threatened.

Panday loyalists organised themselves into a five-member Leadership Council, composed of the three Deputy Leaders (Persad-Bissessar, Wade Mark, and Jack Warner), the Party CEO Tim Gopeesingh, and the newly returned Maharaj. Panday was said to have been appointed as an advisor to the council.

On 10 September at a large rally, Dookeran announced his resignation as UNC Political Leader and the formation of a new party: the Congress of the People. On 11 September, Panday resumed the Chairmanship of the party, and on 3 January 2007, Panday was reinstated as Political Leader of the party.

==== 2007 general election ====
In the 5 November 2007 general election, the party won 29.73% of the popular vote and 15 out of 41 seats.

==== Rise of Kamla Persad-Bissessar ====
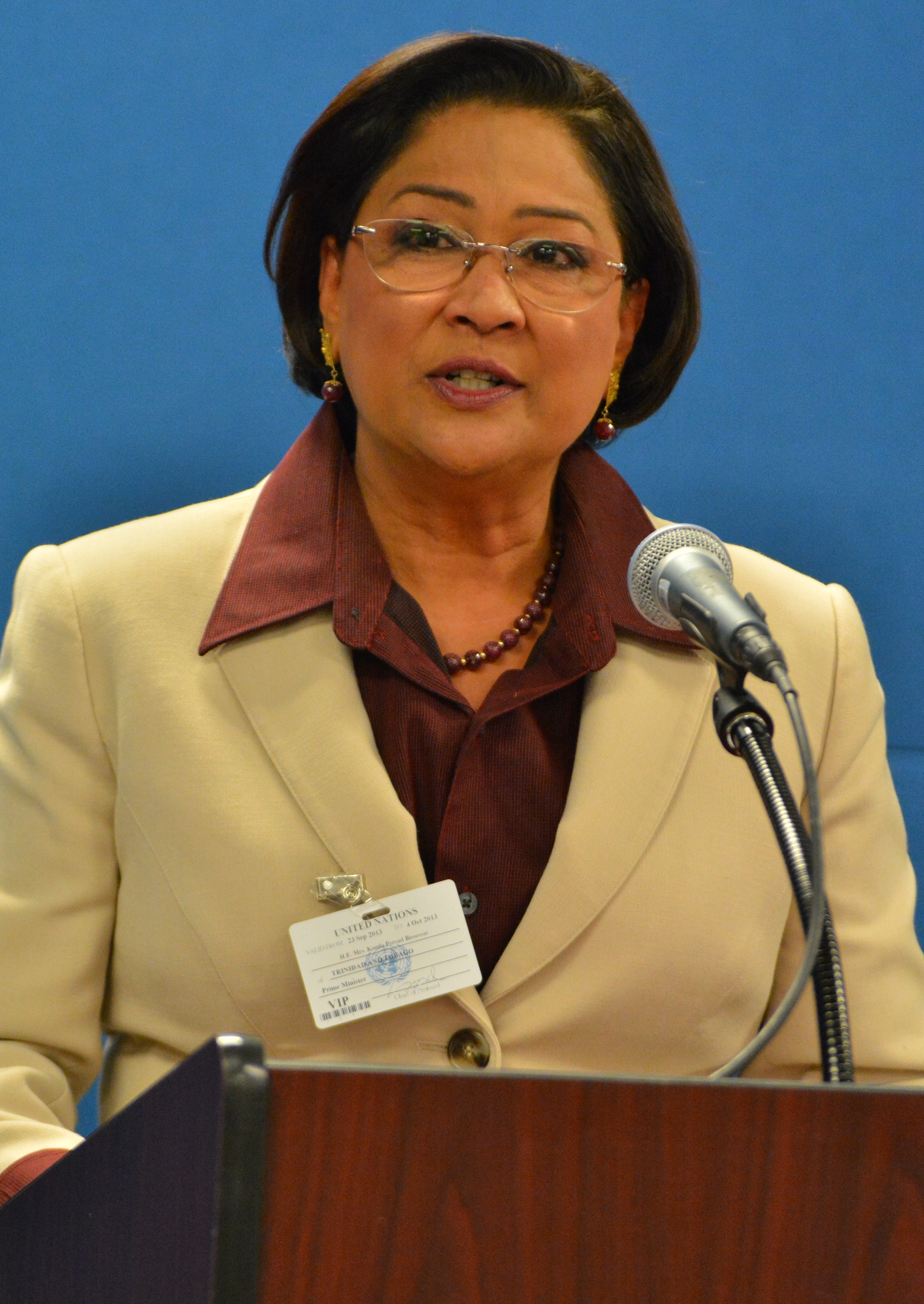
Kamla Persad-Bissessar, the sixth Prime Minister of Trinidad and Tobago (2010–2015) and third leader of the United National Congress

On 24 January 2010, Kamla Persad-Bissessar, member of parliament for Siparia, was elected the new leader of the UNC. In the internal election, she won 13,932 votes compared to 1,359 for Basdeo Panday and 1,072 for Ramesh Maharaj and became the first female leader of a major political party in Trinidad and Tobago.

=== Return to government (2010–2015) ===
Based on a campaign of change against the PNM, the UNC was successful in the 2010 general election, and Persad-Bissessar was appointed as the first-ever female Prime Minister of Trinidad and Tobago. The UNC won a majority of 21 seats. Their coalition controlled 29 seats in total; the Congress of the People won 6 seats and the Tobago Organization of the People won Tobago's only 2 seats.

After the election, the coalition showed signs of weakening. The Movement for Social Justice, which did not win any seats in the election, left the coalition due to discontent with the running of the government. The Tobago Organization of the People failed to win a single seat in the 2013 Tobago House of Assembly elections.

During 2013, the UNC lost 2 seats in by-elections in St. Joseph and Chaguanas West.

=== Second return to opposition (2015–2025) ===
==== 2015 general election ====
In the 2015 general elections, the party won 18 of the 41 seats in the elections to form the main Opposition party in the 11th parliament of Trinidad and Tobago. Persad-Bissessar was appointed Leader of the Opposition by President Anthony Carmona on 21 September 2015.

==== 2015 internal election ====
An internal party election was held on 5 December 2015, which Kamla Persad-Bissessar won as political leader of the party against Roodal Moonilal and Vasant Bharath. Controversy arose when ballots in favor of Roodal Moonilal were found near a river and at the back of a school used as a polling station. The ballots were left out in the open with no visible attempts to destroy or hide them. Some names were found twice on the voting list, which may have allowed one individual to vote twice. Moonilal filed a complaint for these issues to be rectified, however Kamla Persad-Bissessar was declared the winner. 2015 also saw the introduction to the National Executive of young members such as Bheemal Ramlogan, Wilfred Nicholas Morris, Ravi Ratiram and Brian Baig. https://trinidadexpress.com/news/local/unc-final-internal-election-results/article_17ef781d-ebf3-51a0-b474-9987989221c6.html

==== 2016 local election ====
In the 2016 local election, the party won 54 of the 137 seats in the elections and held the majority in 6 of the 14 local councils. According to the election authorities, three of the UNC's candidates were found ineligible or withdrew themselves before polling day, resulting in a walkover victory for the PNM in one district.

==== 2017 internal election ====
In the 2017 internal elections Kamla Persad-Bissessar won virtually all of the votes to continue as political leader of the party against Chanda Bhaggan and Christine Newallo-Hosein. The voter turnout was the lowest recorded in an internal election for the UNC at the time.

==== 2020 general elections ====
The 2020 general elections took place on 10 August 2020 during the COVID-19 pandemic. The UNC's campaign was based on the incumbent PNM government's mishandling of the COVID-19 pandemic, not doing more to control the Venezuelan refugee crisis and having a failing economy. However, Leader of the Opposition Kamla Persad-Bissessar faced backlash due to her statements on her opponent Prime Minister Keith Rowley as a "blank man on the other side", which many interpreted her as saying the "black man", however it was noted that later in her speech's transcript she referenced the "blank man" numerous times. The party also faced questions of corruption amid a police investigation that involved members of the UNC. The UNC won 19 of the 41 constituencies, giving them two more seat than previously held. The results in six constituencies were subject to recounts, causing the final election results to be delayed by a week. This was the first parliamentary election in Trinidad and Tobago where the result was not finalized the day after the election. However, after the recount the UNC did not gain any constituencies, and remained the opposition in the parliament.

==== 2020 internal election ====
The 2020 internal election took place on 6 December 2020, after Opposition Leader Kamla Persad-Bissessar, the current leader of the UNC, faced losses commencing in January 2013 with the wipeout of her People's Partnership-led administration from the Tobago House of Assembly due to the landslide victory of the Tobago Council of the People's National Movement at the 2013 Tobago House of Assembly election, loss in the 2015 Trinidad and Tobago general election and loss in the 2020 Trinidad and Tobago general election. The candidates for political leader were incumbent Kamla Persad-Bissessar on Team Star against former member of parliament for St. Augustine and former Minister of Trade, Industry and Investment in the People's Partnership's government, Vasant Bharath, on Team Lotus. Former senator and Minister of Transport in the People's Partnership's government, Devant Maharaj, was an early candidate for political leader, but was never formally nominated as he dropped out on nomination day on 15 November 2020, citing irregularities in the voting process. He endorsed Vasant Bharath and Team Lotus.

Focus on the leadership election occurred when Anita Haynes, Public Relations Officer of the UNC, was questioned by reporters on whether or not the Opposition Leader Kamla Persad-Bissessar would resign. Devant Maharaj was a leading figure in calling for Kamla Persad-Bissessar to step down as political leader. He actively called for her to step down on social media and on billboards he had put up. On 27 October 2020, Kamla Persad-Bissessar announced the date for the internal election to be held on Sunday 6 December 2020.

On election night, Persad-Bissessar said her Team Star was on the path to defeat Bharath's Team Lotus. She called for unity within the party and said their main political opponent was the People's National Movement. She claimed under her continued leadership that she would work to make the party more united and stronger. She also acknowledged that there was some reports of elections issues, but that overall everything had gone well. Persad-Bissessar said that the low voter turnout was due to the COVID-19 pandemic, as it was in the general election. Bharath conceded shortly after midnight and congratulated Persad-Bissessar and wished her success. He also stated the party needs to determine the reason for the low voter turnout then they need to "inspire their ground troops" to win the next general election. Bharath stated that he was willing to work with Persad-Bissessar to help rebuild the party. However, he mentioned that there were irregularities in the election which he had warned about and many were unable to vote. He said that active campaigner on Persad-Bissessar's team were presiding officers, his team was not granted access to a revised list of electors, that there were reports of voters being verbally abused and intimidated, there was paraphernalia of the Star Team being distributed at some precincts, and that his father John Bharath, a founding member of the UNC, was not on the voting list and that there were other people who were not on the revised voter list who were allowed to vote. Devant Maharaj called on Persad-Bissessar to embrace all and rebuild the party. The election had the lowest voter turnout for an UNC internal election with only 17,066 members out of 120,000+ members coming out to vote. This follows after the last internal election in 2017 was recorded to have the lowest voter turnout.

Founder of the party, Basdeo Panday, commented before the election that the UNC had no future under the leadership of Kamla Persad-Bissessar nor Vassant Bharath and would eventually die out. He reiterated again after the election results that the UNC would die, pointing that it had the lowest voter turn out for an UNC internal election and says that the COVID-19 pandemic had nothing to do with it as the last internal election was the same. He further said that Kamla Persad-Bissessar killed the party "beyond repair" and that the only way to end the "tribal politics" was for a new party to be formed. However, political analyst Mukesh Basdeo disagreed with Panday, saying that the party received a significant number of votes despite the COVID-19 pandemic and that, had the election been held in other conditions, it would have shown a decline in the interest of the party. He also stated that the pandemic deterred people from coming out to vote. He noted that smaller third parties were crushed in the 2020 general election and that most of the votes went to the two major parties, the UNC and the PNM.

=== Second return to government (2025-Present) ===
==== 2025 general election ====
The UNC contested the 2025 Trinidad and Tobago general election as part of the "coalition of interests" with the Progressive Empowerment Party and the Laventille Outreach for Vertical Enrichment movement. In the election the UNC won a majority of seats and returned to government.

== List of political leaders ==
The political leaders of the United National Congress have been as follows (any acting leaders indicated in italics):

Key:

UNC PNM NAR

- PM: Prime Minister
- LO: Leader of the Opposition

Leader		Term of office		Position	Prime Minister
1	Basdeo Panday	16 October 1988	2 October 2005	LO (1990–1995)	Robinson
1	Basdeo Panday	16 October 1988	2 October 2005	LO (1990–1995)	Manning
1	Basdeo Panday	16 October 1988	2 October 2005	PM (1995–2001)	Himself
1	Basdeo Panday	16 October 1988	2 October 2005	LO (2001–2006)	Manning
2	Winston Dookeran	2 October 2005	10 September 2006	MP	Manning
(1)	Basdeo Panday	10 September 2006	24 January 2010	LO (2007–2010)	Manning
3	Kamla Persad-Bissessar	24 January 2010	Incumbent	LO (2006–2007)	Manning
3	Kamla Persad-Bissessar	24 January 2010	Incumbent	LO (2010)	Manning
3	Kamla Persad-Bissessar	24 January 2010	Incumbent	PM (2010–2015)	Herself
3	Kamla Persad-Bissessar	24 January 2010	Incumbent	LO (2015–2025)	Rowley
3	Kamla Persad-Bissessar	24 January 2010	Incumbent	LO (2015–2025)	Young
3	Kamla Persad-Bissessar	24 January 2010	Incumbent	PM (2025–present)	Herself

== Election results ==
=== House of Representatives ===
Yellow indicates seats won by the UNC in the 2020 Trinidad and Tobago general election.

View source data.

Election	Party leader	Votes			Seats		Position	Government
Election	Party leader	No.	%	±	No.	±	Position	Government
1991	Basdeo Panday	151,046	29.2%	—	13 / 36	▲13	2nd	PNM
1995	Basdeo Panday	240,372	45.8%	▲16.6%	17 / 36	▲4	2nd	UNC–NAR
2000	Basdeo Panday	307,791	51.7%	▲5.9%	19 / 36	▲2	▲1st	UNC
2001	Basdeo Panday	279,002	49.9%	▼1.8%	18 / 36	▼1	1st	PNM Minority
2002	Basdeo Panday	284,391	46.9%	▼3.0%	16 / 36	▼2	▼2nd	PNM
2007	Basdeo Panday	194,425	29.7%	▼17.2%	15 / 41	▼1	2nd	PNM
2010	Kamla Persad-Bissessar	316,600	43.7%	▲13.9%	21 / 41	▲6	▲1st	PP
2015	Kamla Persad-Bissessar	290,066	39.6%	▼4.1%	17 / 41	▼4	▼2nd	PNM
2020	Kamla Persad-Bissessar	309,188	47.1%	▲7.5%	19 / 41	▲2	2nd	PNM
2025	Kamla Persad-Bissessar	335,161	54.0%	▲6.9%	26 / 41	▲7	▲1st	Coalition of Interests

=== Corporations ===
Yellow indicates seats and corporations won by the UNC in the 2019 Trinidadian local elections.

View source data.

Election		Votes			Councillors		Corporations	
Election	Leader	No.	Vote share	±	No.	±	No.	±
1992	Basdeo Panday	113,502	36.9%	▲4.5%	53 / 139	▲53	4 / 14	▲1
1996	Basdeo Panday	177,848	49.9%	▲13.0%	61 / 124	▲8	6 / 14	▲2
1999	Basdeo Panday	176,840	52.2%	▲2.3%	57 / 124	▼4	6 / 14	Steady
2003	Basdeo Panday	147,727	45.6%	▼6.6%	43 / 126	▼14	5 / 14	▼1
2010	Kamla Persad-Bissessar	202,380	52.0%	▲6.4%	88 / 134	▲45	9 / 14	▲4
2013	Kamla Persad-Bissessar	121,944	27.0%	▼25.0%	44 / 136	▼44	5 / 14	▼4
2016	Kamla Persad-Bissessar	180,798	50.0%	▲23.0%	54 / 137	▲8	6 / 14	▲1
2019	Kamla Persad-Bissessar	202,584	54.4%	▲4.5%	65 / 139	▲9	7 / 14	▲1
2023	Kamla Persad-Bissessar	173,961	52.5%	▼1.9%	70 / 141	▲5	7 / 14	Steady

=== Tobago House of Assembly ===
View source data.

Election	Leader	Votes			Seats		Position	Government
Election	Leader	No.	%	±	No.	±	Position	Government
2001	Basdeo Panday	1,757	7.8	—	0 / 12	Steady	3rd	PNM

== Members of the National Executive (NATEX) of the Party ==
Position	Officeholder
Political Leader	Kamla Persad-Bissessar
Deputy Political Leaders	Roodal Moonilal; Jearlean K. John; David A. Lee
Chairman	Davendranath Tancoo
Vice Chairwoman	Khadijah Ameen
General Secretary	Peter Kanhai
Policy and Strategy Officer	Sean S. Sobers
Education Officer	Vandana Mohit
Research Officer	Saddam Hosein
Elections Officer	Don T. Sylvester
Treasurer	Colin Neil Gosine
Party Organizer	Ravi Ratiram
International Relations Officer	Wilfred Nicholas Morris
Northeast Regional Representative	Anil Roberts
South Regional Representative	Shanty Boodram
Northwest Regional Representative	Eli Zakour
Central Regional Representative	Barry Padarath
Tobago Regional Representative	Taharqa Obika
Youth Arm Chairman	Daniel Rasheed
Women's Arm Chairwoman	Kenya Charles
Public Relations Officer	Kirk Meighoo
Social Media Manager	William Archie
Legal Officer	Brian Baig

== Youth Arm ==
The new executive members of the UNC Youth Arm are as follows:

Position	Officeholder
Chairman	Daniel Rasheed
Vice Chairwoman	Shaniqua Piper
Secretary	Tramaine Edwards
Assistant Secretary	Amaara Hosein
Welfare Officer	Krishna Avidesh Sankar

== Women's Arm ==
The executive members of the UNC Women's Arm are:

Position	Officeholder
Chairwoman	Kenya Charles
Vice Chairwoman	Vandana Mohit
Secretary	Sophia St.Hilaire
Assistant Secretary	Racquel Ghany
Treasurer	Wendy Renuka Francis
Welfare Officer	J-Lynn Roopnarine
Public Relations Officer	Marissa Ramlogan
