= List of political parties in Trinidad and Tobago =

This article lists political parties in Trinidad and Tobago. Trinidad and Tobago has a de facto two-party system.

The People's National Movement (PNM) and the United National Congress (UNC) are the two biggest political parties, and have supplied every Prime Minister since 1991. The UNC has governed Trinidad and Tobago from 1995-2001, 2010-2015 and since 2025. The PNM governed from 1956–86, 1991–95, 2001–2010, and 2015–2025.

The Tobago-based Tobago People's Party is the third biggest political party, with 2 members in the House of Representatives (Trinidad and Tobago), since 2025, and 13 members in the Tobago House of Assembly, since 2023. The PNM is the only political party which contests elections in both Trinidad and Tobago.

== Political parties with representation at a local or national level ==
Name	Founded	Orientation	Leader(s)	House of Representatives	Senate	Councillors in municipal corporations	Municipal corporations	Tobago House of Assembly	Membership	TT vote share % (2025 general election)
United National Congress	1989	Centre-left, Democratic socialism, Social democracy, Third Way	Kamla Persad-Bissessar	26 / 41	16 / 31	70 / 141	7 / 14	0 / 15 (N/A; Does not contest)	120,000+ (December 2020)	54.04
People's National Movement	1955	Centre to Centre-left, Liberalism, Social liberalism, Moderate nationalism	Pennelope Beckles-Robinson	13 / 41	6 / 31	71 / 141	7 / 14	1 / 15	105,894(November 2022)	36.18
Tobago People's Party	2023	Tobago regionalism, Tobago self-determination	Farley Chavez Augustine	2 / 41	0 / 31	0 / 139	0 / 14	13 / 15	Not published	2.23
Progressive Democratic Patriots	2016	Tobago regionalism, Tobago independence	Watson Duke	0 / 41	0 / 31	0 / 139	0 / 14	1 / 15	Not published	0.23

=== Other parties with symbols registered with the Elections And Boundaries Commission (EBC) ===
- Innovative Democratic Alliance
- National Transformation Alliance
- Progressive Empowerment Party
- Independent Liberal Party
- Movement for Social Justice
- Movement for National Development
- Congress of the People
- Democratic Party of Trinidad and Tobago
- Laventille Outreach for Vertical Enrichment
- Trinidad and Tobago Democratic Front
- New National Vision
- Trinidad Humanity Campaign
- National Organization of We the People
- National Transformation Alliance
- Progressive Party
- One Tobago Voice
- Unrepresented Peoples Party
- Unity of the People
- The National Party
- Port of Spain People's Movement
- National Solidarity Assembly
- Patriotic Front
- Green Party

=== Defunct or dormant political parties ===
Parties which have won seats in elections are in bold.

- African National Congress
- British Empire Citizens' and Workers' Home Rule Party
- Caribbean National Labour Party
- Caribbean People's Democratic Party
- Caribbean Socialist Party
- Class Action Reform Movement (CARM)
- Committee for Transformation and Progress
- Citizens' Alliance
- Curepe United People's Committee
- Democratic Action Congress
- Democratic Labour Party
- Democratic Development Party
- Democratic Liberation Party
- Democratic National Alliance
- Democratic National Assembly
- East Indian National Association
- Fargo House Movement
- February 18 Movement
- Liberal Party
- Liberation Action Party
- Movement for National Transformation
- Movement for Social Transformation (MOTION)
- Movement for Unity and Progress
- National Alliance for Reconstruction
- National Democratic Alliance (Trinidad & Tobago)
- National Democratic Organisation
- **National Democratic Party**
- National Development Party
- National Freedom Party
- National Liberation Movement (NLM)
- **National Progressive Party**
- National Joint Action Committee
- National Team Unity
- National Transformation Movement
- National Transformation Party
- Nationwide Transformation Movement
- National Trinidad and Tobago Party
- National Union of Freedom Fighters (NUFF)
- Natural Law Party
- New Beginning Movement (NBM)
- **Organisation for National Reconstruction**
- Our Party
- Party of Political Progress Groups
- **People's Democratic Party**
- People's Empowerment Party
- People's Liberation Movement
- People's Popular Movement
- People's Republican Party
- Point Fortin Vigilante Welfare Group
- **Political Progress Groups**
- Progressive Democratic Party
- Progressive Workers Democrat Movement
- Republican Party of Trinidad and Tobago
- Seukeran Independent Party
- Social Democratic Labour Party of Trinidad and Tobago
- Socialist Alternative
- Summit of People's Organisations (SOPO)
- Tapia House Movement
- **Tobago Organisation of the People**
- **Trinidad Labour Party**
- Trades Union Council
- **Trades Union Council and Caribbean Socialist Party**
- The Mercy Society
- The Organization Of Independent Candidates
- The People's Voice
- United Country Group, St Andrew-St. David
- **United Front**
- **United Labour Front**
- United Revolutionary Organization (URO)
- West Indian Independence Party
- West Indian National Party
- West Indian Political Congress Movement
- Young People's National Party
- Youth Empowerment Party
- Workers and Farmers Party

== See also ==
- Politics of Trinidad and Tobago
- List of political parties by country
