= Natural Law Party =

- Founded: 1992; 34 years ago
- Ideology: Pro-Transcendental Meditation; Environmentalism; Natural Law
- Political position: Centre-left
- Slogan: A Reason to Vote

Website
- natural-law.org

The Natural Law Party (NLP) is a transnational party founded in 1992 on "the principles of Transcendental Meditation", the laws of nature, and their application to all levels of government. At its peak, it was active in up to 74 countries; it continues in India and at the state level in the United States. The party defines "natural law" as the organizing intelligence which governs the natural universe. The Natural Law Party advocates using the Transcendental Meditation technique and the TM-Sidhi program as tools to enliven natural law and reduce or eliminate problems in society.

Prominent candidates included John Hagelin for U.S. president and Doug Henning as representative of Rosedale, Toronto, Canada. George Harrison performed a benefit concert in support of the party in 1992. Electoral success was achieved by the Ajeya Bharat Party in India, which elected a legislator to the state assembly, and the Croatian NLP, which elected a member of their regional assembly in 1993. In 2002, in the USA, its organization was reported to rival that of other "established third parties", but most party chapters have since disbanded.

== History and platform ==
According to the Maharishi Mahesh Yogi, the Natural Law Party (NLP) was first founded in the United Kingdom in March 1992 and was later established in the United States, France, Austria, Germany, Croatia, Israel, Japan, Spain, the Netherlands, Italy, Australia, Norway, Sweden, New Zealand, Chile, Thailand and Canada. The American branch of the party was founded later that year in Fairfield, Iowa U.S.A. by educators, business leaders, lawyers and other supporters of the Transcendental Meditation movement. The party was active in many countries and delegates from 60 countries attended an international convention in Bonn, Germany in 1998. The party became largely inactive in the United States in 2004 and was discontinued in the Netherlands in 2007.

The party had its foundation in the principles of Transcendental Meditation and was committed to "prevention oriented government and conflict free politics" through holistic health programmes and the practice of the Transcendental Meditation technique. In Scotland and Wales, party advertisements proclaimed that "natural law which silently governs the whole universe in perfect order and without a problem." The Scotland and Wales branch of the party promised reduced pollution, the elimination of genetically modified crops and an increase in sustainable agriculture. They also supported free college education and the use of the Transcendental Meditation technique in the school system. In the UK, NLP candidate Geoffrey Clements advocated the use of Transcendental Meditation and the TM-Sidhi program's yogic flying practice to reduce crime and war deaths. In the US, its platform included clean energy, labeling of genetically modified foods, a ban on the construction of nuclear energy plants, and an end to political action committees.

== National branches ==
The Natural Law Party was reported in 1998 to be active in 74 countries including Australia, Austria, Belgium, Canada, Croatia, Finland, France, Germany, India, Ireland, Israel, Italy, New Zealand, the Netherlands, Trinidad and Tobago, the United Kingdom and the United States.

=== Australia ===
In 1993, Bevan Morris campaigned for the suburban Adelaide seat of Boothby in the Australian House of Representatives on the NLP ticket. The party contested several federal and state elections between 1990 and 1998.

=== Canada ===
The Natural Law Party was active in the Canadian federal elections of 1993, 1997 and 2000 and in provincial elections in Ontario and Quebec during this period; it was deregistered in 2003.

=== Croatia ===
In Croatia, a party member was elected to a regional assembly in 1993.

=== France ===
Benoît Frappé of France was the party's candidate for the European Parliament.

=== Germany ===
Between 1992 and 2005, a Natural Law Party existed in Germany. Its name was Naturgesetz-Partei, Aufbruch zu neuem Bewusstsein, shortened to NATURGESETZ or Bewusstsein. In 1995 it had around 2,000 members, 150 thereof in Berlin.

=== India ===
The Natural Law Party in India is known as the Ajeya Bharat Party (AJBP) or Invincible India Party. It promotes a Vedic way of life. It was formed in late 1998 as the political wing of the Maharishi Vedic Vishwa Prashasan (MVVP (Maharishi Global Administration Through Natural Law)), which had nominated thirty-four candidates in the February 1998 parliamentary election from Madhya Pradesh. The Maharishi was said to be "keenly interested" in building a political base in his native province. The MVVP received 0.28% of the vote in its first election. Mukesh Nayak left the cabinet and the Congress Party to assume the leadership of the Madhya Pradesh MVVP. For the November 1998 election, the Ajeya Bharat had a list of 100 candidates for the Assembly. It received 0.5% of the vote and won one seat in the 320-member state assembly. The following year, that member switched parties, leaving the Ajeya Bharat with no representation. In 2008, Nayak left the party to rejoin the Congress Party. In 2009, the Ajeya Bharat Party president, Ambati Krishnamurthy, filed a complaint against another party for using a flag similar to its own.

=== Ireland ===
The Natural Law Party became active in Ireland in 1994 and was based in Dublin. The party leader was John Burns, who was one of nine Natural Law Party candidates in the 1997 general election. In addition, there were four candidates in the European elections of 1999. Burns endorsed the alternative health system of Maharishi Vedic Approach to Health and the five European candidates gained about 0.5% of first-preference votes cast. Burns, who also contested the 1999 Dublin South-Central by-election, spent only £163 on his campaign. After 1999, the party ceased to field candidates in Ireland. The amount of corporate political donations in 2000 was nil.

=== Israel ===
The Natural Law Party of Israel (Hebrew: מפלגת חוק הטבע של ישראל, Mifleget Hok HaTeva Shel Yisrael) was a minor political party in Israel. Its leader was Amihai Rokah. In the 1992 elections the Natural Law Party won 1,734 votes (0.06%), and in the 1999 elections, won 2,924 votes (0.09%), both below the then 1.5% electoral threshold required to enter the Knesset. It has not run in an election since and its website states it has ceased political activity. As of 2018, however, it is still registered as a party in Israel.

=== Italy ===
The Natural Law Party in Italy (Partito della Legge Naturale, PLN) participated in several (both general and local) elections in the 1990s. In the 1994 general elections it won 24,897 votes (0.06%) for the Chamber of Deputies and 86,588 votes (0.26%) for the Senate. The list was on ballot in a few constituencies only. In the 1996 general elections the Natural Law Party ran candidates only in the Trentino-Alto Adige/Südtirol region, who won 8,298 votes for the Chamber of Deputies and 5,842 for the Senate (about 1% on a regional basis, 0.2% in the whole country).

=== New Zealand ===
The Natural Law Party contested New Zealand general elections such as the 1996 election. It did not win any representation.

=== Trinidad and Tobago ===
The Natural Law Party in Trinidad and Tobago contested the 1995 general elections. It received 1,590 votes, but failed to win a seat.

=== United Kingdom ===
The Natural Law Party was founded in the United Kingdom in March 1992. Geoffrey Clements was its leader.

The UK manifesto, as published on its website, listed five key aspects of a successful government including:

1. The development of each individual's consciousness through the Transcendental Meditation and TM-Sidhi programme
2. Reduce health care costs by training the citizens in personal health assessment via self-pulse reading, an aspect of the Maharishi Vedic Approach to Health.
3. Maintaining the collective health of the country by creating groups of experts in the TM-Sidhi programme's Yogic Flying technique.
4. Bringing the individual and the country into tune with Natural Law so that unfavourable planetary influences are neutralised.
5. Assuring that the country's work and home environments support health, and happiness.

In the 1992 general election, held on 9 April, the NLP contested 310 seats in the UK, garnering 0.19% of the vote, with every candidate losing their deposit for failing to receive at least 5% of the vote. The group announced that they had budgeted nearly £1 million for the campaign. A significant number of constituencies were contested by nationals of countries outside the UK, including Canada, Australia, New Zealand, and India, as British electoral law allows any member of a Commonwealth country to stand for Parliament. Among them was Canadian-born magician Doug Henning. Despite the "dismal" number of votes, an article in The Herald of Scotland reported that it could be considered a "reasonable return for a campaign which began only three weeks before polling day." In addition the NLP "notched up" a "headline-grabbing record" when it put forward candidates for all 87 United Kingdom seats in the 1994 European Parliament; the first party to do so.

George Harrison performed a fund-raising concert at the Royal Albert Hall in London for the NLP on 6 April 1992, his first full concert in the UK since 1969. According to Harrison, a week before the general election, Maharishi Mahesh Yogi suggested to Harrison that he, Paul McCartney and Ringo Starr stand for election as MPs for Liverpool seats as NLP candidates, but they declined.

In the 1997 general election, the NLP ran 197 candidates for Parliament in the UK, garnering 0.1% of the vote, with every candidate losing their deposit.

The NLP ran 16 candidates in the 20 by-elections held between 1992 and 1997, with every candidate losing their deposit. The NLP ran eight candidates for the 16 by-elections held between 1997 and 2001, averaging 0.10% of the vote, with every candidate losing their deposit. The NLP did not run any candidates for Parliament in the 2001 general election or in the succeeding by-elections. The party, along with its Northern Ireland wing, voluntarily deregistered with the Electoral Commission at the end of 2003.

==== Northern Ireland ====
It contested its first election in Northern Ireland in the 1994 EU elections. According to the NLP, they prepared a 70-page report in response to the "1996 Framework Document of the British and Irish governments." The report was presented to leaders in Ireland, Northern Ireland and the U.S. Afterwards, NLP representatives participated in the "special elections to the Northern Ireland Forum", but withdrew before the election.

=== United States ===
The Natural Law Party (United States) ran John Hagelin as its presidential candidate in 1992, 1996, and 2000. He was on ballots in 48 states and received 110,000 votes (0.12%) in 1996. The party also ran congressional and local candidates. In California, psychiatrist Harold H. Bloomfield ran as candidate for governor in 1998. It attempted to merge with the Reform Party in 2000. The NLP in the United States was largely disbanded in 2004. However, some state affiliates, such as Michigan, have kept their ballot positions and allied with other small parties.

== See also ==
- Political parties of the world
- List of political parties in the United States
- Parti de la loi naturelle (natural law party of France; article in French Wikipedia)
- Naturgesetz Partei (natural law party of Germany; article in German Wikipedia)
- Österreichische Naturgesetzpartei (natural law party of Austria (ÖNP); article in German Wikipedia)
- Luonnonlain puolue (Law of Nature Party of Finland (LLP); article in Finnish Wikipedia)
