= 2019 Trinidadian local elections =

- 2 December 2019

All 14 Municipal Corporation Electoral Areas
- Opinion polls
Turnout
34.7% (▲0.2 pp)
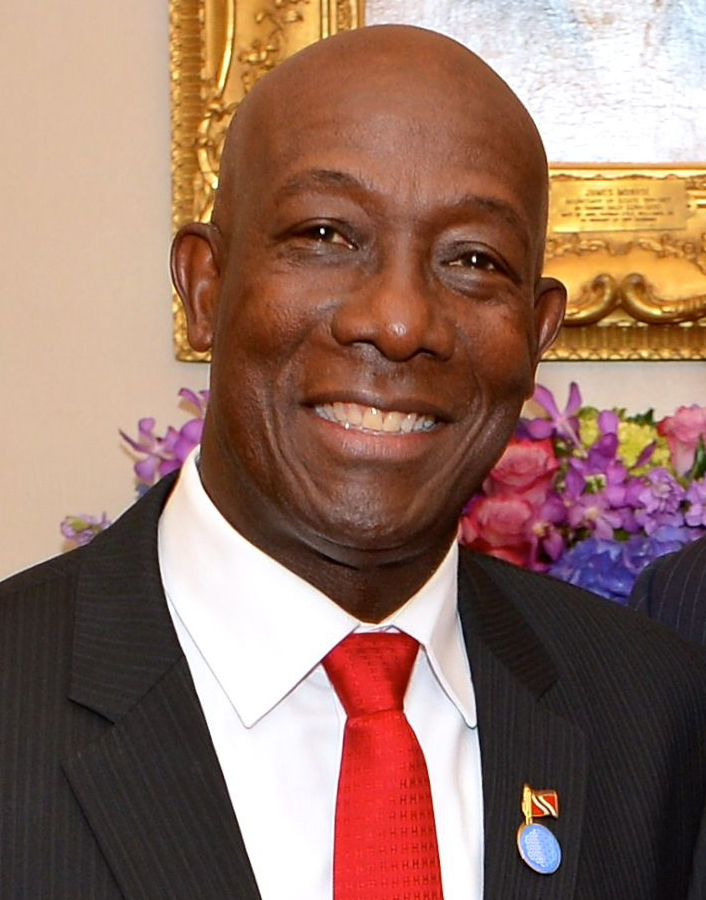

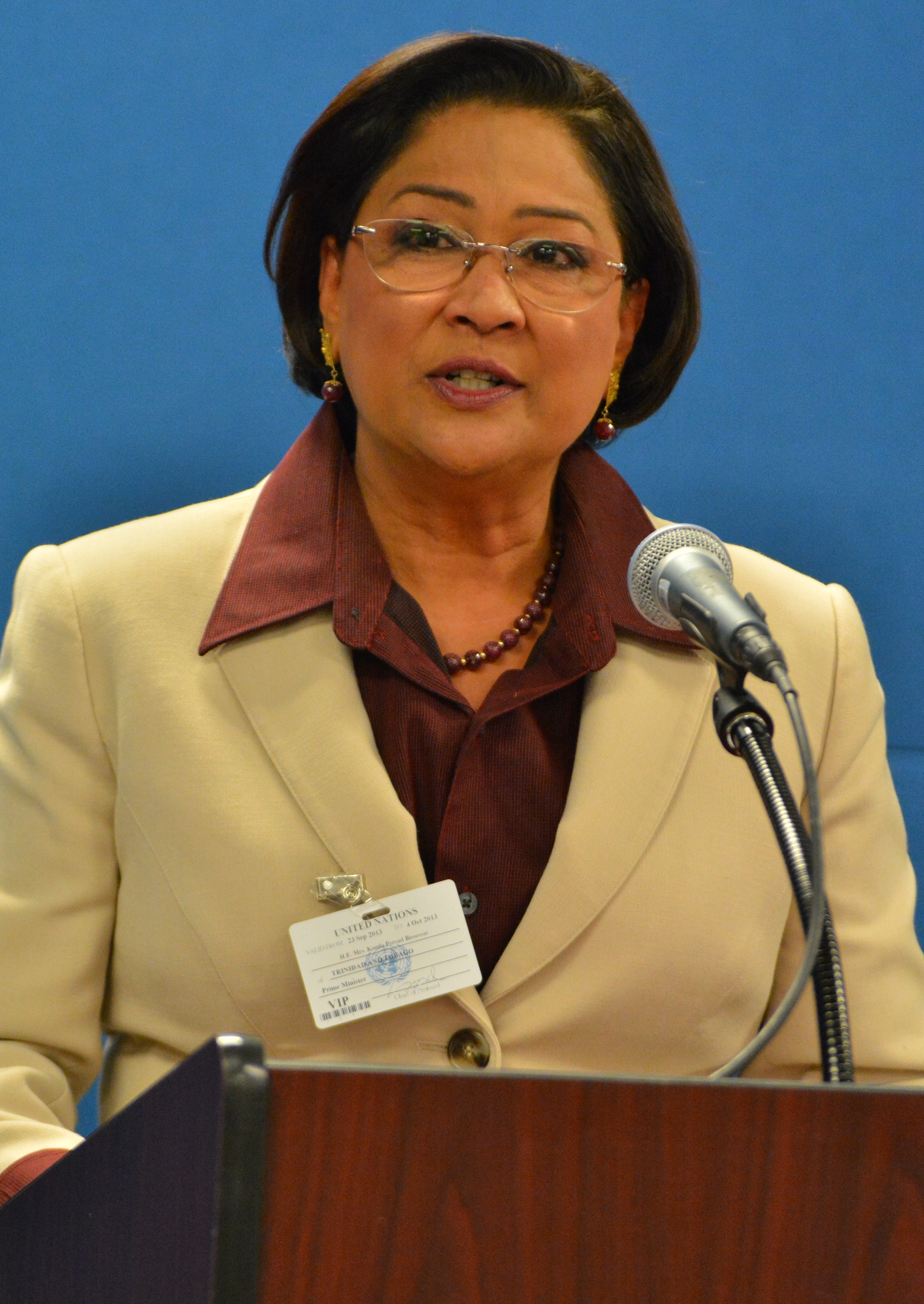
Leader	Keith Rowley	Kamla Persad-Bissesar
Party	PNM	UNC
Leader since	26 May 2010	24 January 2010
Last election	83 councillors, 48.2% 8 municipal corporations	54 councillors, 49.9% 6 municipal corporations
Popular vote	161,962 43.60%	202,584 54.59%
Swing	▼4.76%	▲4.48%
Municipal Corporations	7 / 14	7 / 14
Municipal Corporations +/–	▼1	▲1
Councillors	72 / 139	67 / 139
Councillors +/–	▼11	▲13

Local elections in Trinidad and Tobago were held on 2 December 2019, contesting 139 electoral districts across Trinidad's 14 municipal corporation electoral areas.

With the exception of those areas that have had boundary changes, the seats up for election were last contested in the 2016 local elections.

Both parties won control of seven of the 14 corporations with the People's National Movement (PNM) losing their minority control status in the Sangre Grande regional corporation. The PNM won 72 of the 139 electoral districts, but lost the popular vote and 11 electoral districts: Sangre Grande North West in the Sangre Grande regional corporation, Lengua/Indian Walk in the Princes Town Regional Corporation, Siparia West/Fyzabad in the Siparia Regional Corporation, Cocal/Mafeking in the Mayaro–Rio Claro Regional Corporation, Enterprise South/Longdenville North in the Chaguanas Borough Corporation, Caura/Paradise/Tacarigua in the Tunapuna–Piarco Regional Corporation, Les Effort West/La Romaine, Marabella West and Marabella West/Vistabella in the San Fernando City Corporation while gaining two from the United National Congress, in the San Juan–Laventille Regional Corporation, San Juan East and Barataria. The UNC also won the newly created districts of El Socorro/Aranguez North and La Fortune/Debe North, in the San Juan–Laventille and Penal–Debe Regional Corporation.

== Seats held prior to the election ==
The major political parties were defending the following numbers of electoral districts from municipal corporations on election day:

- People's National Movement (PNM) – 83 electoral districts from 8 municipal corporations
- United National Congress (UNC) – 54 electoral districts from 6 municipal corporations

These numbers are how many seats each party had won at the previous election, in 2016, rather than which party held the seat on the eve of the election.

== Eligibility to vote ==
All registered electors (Trinidadians and Tobagonians, Commonwealth and Non-Commonwealth citizens) who will be aged 18 or over, resided legally in Trinidad and Tobago and have resided in an electoral district/constituency for a least two months prior to the election date are entitled to vote in the local elections.

== Parties and standings ==
Political parties registered with the Elections and Boundaries Commission can contest the local elections. The following registered parties contested the local elections:

Party	Founded	Ideology	Leader(s)	Leader since	Last election			At dissolution		Notes
Party	Founded	Ideology	Leader(s)	Leader since	% party vote	Municipal Corporations	Electoral districts	Municipal Corporations	Electoral districts	Notes
PNM	1955	Liberalism, Social liberalism, Moderate nationalism	Keith Rowley	May 2010	48.24%	8 / 14 (57%)	83 / 137 (61%)	8 / 14 (57%)	84 / 137 (61%)	
UNC	1989	Democratic socialism, Social democracy, Third Way	Kamla Persad-Bissessar	January 2010	49.90%	6 / 14 (43%)	54 / 137 (39%)	6 / 14 (43%)	53 / 137 (39%)	
COP	2006	Reformism	Carolyn Seepersad-Bachan	November 2017	0.50%	0 / 14 (0%)	0 / 137 (0%)	0 / 14 (0%)	0 / 137 (0%)	
MSJ	2010	Social justice, Direct democracy	David Abdulah	January 2012	0.22%	0 / 14 (0%)	0 / 137 (0%)	0 / 14 (0%)	0 / 137 (0%)	
PPM	2019	Localism	Louis Lee Sing	October 2019	–	–	–	–	–	
MND	2019 (refounded)	Diego Martin regionalism	Garvin Nicholas	September 2019	–	–	–	–	–	
NTP	1995	Localism, Nationalism	Ursus Daniel		–	–	–	–	–	

== Campaign slogans ==
Party	Slogan
People's National Movement	"We Getting it Done" "Doing it Right"
United National Congress	"Worknation"

== Opinion polls ==
The North American Caribbean Teachers Association (NACTA) commissioned opinion polling for the next general election regularly sampling the electorates' opinions.

=== Municipal Corporation projections ===
Date	Pollster	Sample size	PNM	UNC	Other
2 December 2019	Local Election results	–	7	7	0
29 November 2019	NACTA	–	7 (+2)	5 (+2)	0
21 November 2019	NACTA	–	8 (+3)	3 (+3)	0
11 April 2019	NACTA	–	7 (+3)	5 (+3)	0
16 July 2018		Barataria and Belmont East Local Government Bye-Elections			

== Summary results ==
Elections were conducted under the first-past-the-post system.

Percentage of vote share
1. PNM (43.5%)
2. UNC (54.4%)
3. Other (2.10%)

Elections And Boundaries Commission December 2, 2019 Local Election Preliminary Results Trinidad and Tobago Express December 2, 2019 Local Election Preliminary Results Summary
↓
7	7
PNM	UNC

Party	Votes			Corporations		Seats	
PNM	161,962	43.5%	▼4.8%	7 / 14 (50%)	▼1	72 / 139 (52%)	▼9
UNC	202,584	54.4%	▲4.5%	7 / 14 (50%)	▲1	67 / 139 (48%)	▲9

=== Results by municipal corporation electoral area ===
	Prior to election					Post election				
Municipal Corporation	Seats	Turnout	Control	PNM	UNC	Seats	Turnout	Control	PNM	UNC
Arima	7	31.87%	PNM	7	0	7	33.29%	PNM	6	1
Chaguanas	8	40.54%	UNC	3	5	8	38.05%	UNC	1	7
Couva–Tabaquite–Talparo	14	37.67%	UNC	0	14	14	36.98%	UNC	0	14
Diego Martin	10	21.80%	PNM	10	0	10	23.73%	PNM	10	0
Mayaro–Rio Claro	6	49.82%	UNC	2	4	6	43.53%	UNC	1	5
Penal–Debe	9	40.43%	UNC	0	9	10	39.92%	UNC	0	9
Point Fortin	6	34.91%	PNM	6	0	6	34.74%	PNM	6	0
Port of Spain	12	22.78%	PNM	14	0	12	24.40%	PNM	12	0
Princes Town	10	41.55%	UNC	1	9	10	40.51%	UNC	0	10
San Fernando	9	36.27%	PNM	9	0	9	35.72%	PNM	6	3
San Juan–Laventille	13	24.64%	PNM	11	2	14	25.63%	PNM	12	1
Sangre Grande	8	37.60%	PNM (minority)	4	4	8	42.02%	UNC	3	5
Siparia	9	41.82%	UNC	4	5	9	41.92%	UNC	3	6
Tunapuna–Piarco	16	32.66%	PNM	12	4	16	34.28%	PNM	11	5
All fourteen municipal corporations	137	34.34%		83	54	139	34.71%		72	65
Source: Report of the Elections and Boundaries Commission on the Local Government Elections held on Monday, December 2, 2019

Municipal Corporation	Control	Councillors			
Municipal Corporation	Control	Total	PNM	UNC	Other
Arima	PNM	7	6	1	
Chaguanas	UNC	8	1	7	
Couva–Tabaquite–Talparo	UNC	14	0	14	
Diego Martin	PNM	10	10	0	
Mayaro–Rio Claro	UNC	6	1	5	
Penal–Debe	UNC	10	0	10	
Point Fortin	PNM	6	6	0	
Port of Spain	PNM	12	12	0	
Princes Town	UNC	10	0	10	
San Fernando	PNM	9	6	3	
San Juan–Laventille	PNM	14	12	2	
Sangre Grande	UNC	8	3	5	
Siparia	UNC	9	3	6	
Tunapuna–Piarco	PNM	16	11	5	
Totals		139	71	68	

==== Allocation of Aldermen ====
Municipal Corporation	Aldermen			
Municipal Corporation	Total	PNM	UNC	Other
Arima	4	3	1	
Chaguanas	4	1	3	
Couva–Tabaquite–Talparo	4	1	3	
Diego Martin	4	3	1	
Mayaro–Rio Claro	4	1	3	
Penal–Debe	4	0	4	
Point Fortin	4	4	0	
Port of Spain	4	4	0	
Princes Town	4	1	3	
San Fernando	4	6	3	
San Juan–Laventille	4	3	1	
Sangre Grande	4	2	2	
Siparia	4	2	2	
Tunapuna–Piarco	4	2	2	
Totals	56	29	27	

=== Results by party ===
Party	Party leader	Candidates	Councillors			% of councillors			Votes			% of Votes		
Party	Party leader	Candidates	2016	2019	+/-	2016	2019	+/-	2016	2019	+/-	2016	2019	+/-
PNM	Keith Rowley	139	83	72	▼11	60.6%	51.8%	▼8.8%	174,754	162,801	▼11,953	48.24%	43.60%	▼4.6%
UNC	Kamla Persad-Bissessar	139	54	67	▲13	39.4%	48.2%	▲8.8%	180,758	203,868	▲23,110	49.90%	54.59%	▲4.7%
MSJ	David Abdulah	28	0	0	Steady	0.0%	0.0%	Steady	790	2,608	▲1,818	0.22%	0.70%	▲0.5%
PPM	Louis Lee Sing	12	n/a	0	n/a	n/a	0.0%	n/a	n/a	1,349	n/a	n/a	0.36%	n/a
COP	Carolyn Seepersad-Bachan	8	0	0	Steady	0.0%	0.0%	Steady	1,803	899	▼904	0.50%	0.24%	▼0.3%
MND	Garvin Nicholas	4	n/a	0	n/a	n/a	0.0%	n/a	n/a	403	n/a	n/a	0.11%	n/a
NTP	Ursus Daniel	1	n/a	0	n/a	n/a	0.0%	n/a	n/a	11	n/a	n/a	0.00%	n/a
Independent	N/A	8	0	0	Steady	0.0%	0.0%	Steady	1,071	521	550	0.30%	0.86%	▼0.6%
Total		339	137	139	▲2	100%	100%	Steady	362,254	373,437	▲11,183	100%	100%	Steady
Electorate: 1,079,976 Total votes: 373,437 Turnout: 34.71%

== See also ==
- 2020 Trinidad and Tobago general election
