= National Transformation Party =

The National Transformation Party may refer to:

- National Transformation Party (Trinidad and Tobago)
- Rashtriya Parivartan Dal, a political party in India whose name translates as National Transformation Party
- the Nation Transformation Party in Papua New Guinea, sometimes referred to as National Transformation Party
