= Dibe =

Dibe may refer to more than one place:

- Dibe (Trinidad and Tobago) is the name of a city in Saint James, Trinidad and Tobago
