= Democratic National Alliance =

Democratic National Alliance may refer to:

- Democratic National Alliance (Bahamas)
- Democratic National Alliance (Sri Lanka)
- Democratic National Alliance (Trinidad and Tobago)
- Democratic People's Alliance or Democratic National Alliance, Bosnia and Herzegovina
