= National Democratic Alliance (Trinidad & Tobago) =

The National Democratic Alliance is a political party in Trinidad and Tobago. It was formed in July 2006 by an alliance of the National Democratic Party of Micheal Sims, the Democratic Party of Trinidad and Tobago led by Steve Alvarez, the National Alliance for Reconstruction led by Carson Charles,

The latter two entities had previously been part of a grouping called the Democratic National Alliance in June 2006, which had also included the Democratic National Assembly (DNA), the Grassroots Foundation and independent MP Gerald Yetming. When the DNA withdrew from the alliance and the NDP joined it the grouping renamed itself the National Democratic Alliance.

The Democratic National Alliance was under the interim leadership of former United National Congress politician Gerald Yetming, with Steve Alvarez (leader of the DPTT) as deputy chairman, Hugh Wooding Thomas as secretary, Afra Raymond, (NAR Political Leader) Carson Charles as policy officer and Hilda Goodial as elections officer.

In September 2006, Yetming joined the newly formed Congress of the People led by Mr. Dookeran. He advised that other NDA members follow him. In late October the Grassroots Foundation followed Yetming and joined the COP.

On 3 October 2006 the NDA announced that it would continue to exist as a party separate from the Congress of the People. Carson Charles was elected Political Leader and Hilda Goodial was elected chairman.

On 10 July 2007 it was announced that the Constituent parties of the NDA namely the DPTT, NDP and the NAR would be joining with the United National Congress in a new formation titled the UNC/Alliance. The Tobago branch of the NAR announced that it was not part of this new formation.
