= Faris Al-Rawi =

Trinidad and Tobago politician and attorney

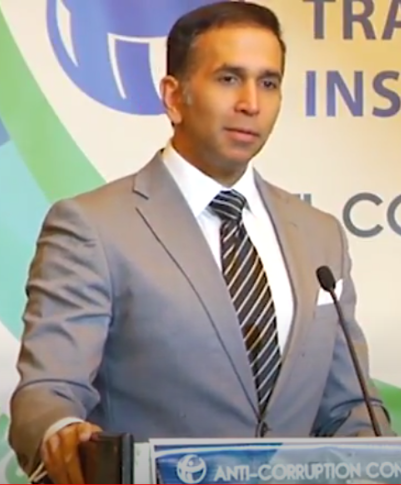

Attorney General of Trinidad and Tobago
- In office 9 September 2015 – 16 March 2022
- Preceded by: Garvin Nicholas
- Succeeded by: Reginald Armour

Member of Parliament, House of Representatives
- In office 7 September 2015 – 18 March 2025
- Preceded by: Carolyn Seepersad-Bachan
- Succeeded by: Michael Dowlath
- Constituency: San Fernando West
- Majority: 3,310 (19.39%)

Personal details
- Born: 2 May 1971 (age 55) San Fernando, Trinidad and Tobago
- Party: People's National Movement
- Spouse: Mona Nahous
- Relations: Lionel Frank Seukeran (grandfather)
- Children: Abraham Al-Rawi, Jinan Al-Rawi, Julia Al-Rawi
- Education: University of the West Indies; King's College London

Faris Al-Rawi is a Trinidadian and Tobagonian politician. He was the former Attorney General of Trinidad and Tobago from 2015 to 2022. He was the Member of the House of Representatives for the constituency of San Fernando West from 2015 to 2025.

== Early life ==
Faris Al-Rawi was born in San Fernando to Husam Al-Rawi and Diane Seukeran. His father is a Muslim Iraqi Arab, while his mother, a Presbyterian Indo-Trinidadian politician, represented the San Fernando West constituency in Parliament. His maternal grandfather, Lionel Frank Seukeran, served in Parliament as a member of the Democratic Labour Party, a former opposing party of the People's National Movement and predecessor to the United National Congress. His maternal great-grandfather was Pundit Seukeran Sharma, a Hindu priest, from Tableland who had immigrated from Varanasi, India.

Al-Rawi was educated at Presentation College, San Fernando, the University of the West Indies and completed a master's degree in law at King's College London.

Through his Iraqi father, he traces his descent back to the al-Rawi family of the al-Rifa'i tribe descended from Musa al-Kazim, but he is noted for his relaxed religious views and mixed religious background. He has described himself as "the son of an Iraqi Muslim man, a Trinidadian Presbyterian woman and a Hindu [maternal] grandfather". He is married to Mona Nahous, a Catholic of Arab descent. He has also said he has fasted for Diwali, Ramadan, and Lent, calls himself a "child of God" when asked what his religion was, and stated that he refrained from eating pork and drinking alcohol.

== Political career ==
Al-Rawi entered politics in 1995 as a legal advisor to the Tunapuna – Piarco Regional Corporation. He served as an Alderman in the Port of Spain City Corporation between 2003 and 2006 and was appointed an Opposition Senator in 2010. Al-Rawi contested San Fernando West constituency in the 2015 General Election, beating Raziah Ahmed of the United National Congress. Newly elected Prime Minister Keith Rowley appointed Al-Rawi as Attorney-General and he served from 2015 to 2022.

In the 2025 Trinidad and Tobago general election, he was unseated by Michael Dowlath from the United National Congress (UNC).

== Controversy ==
In October 2016 Al-Rawi's children were photographed in possession of high powered military grade assault rifles. He responded that they were receiving training from the Trinidad and Tobago Defence Force in response to unreported death threats. The fact of their training was confirmed by the Defence Force.

== Electoral record ==
2025 Trinidad and Tobago general election: San Fernando West
Party	Candidate	Votes	%	±%
UNC	Michael Dowlath	7,341	50.3%	▲
PNM	Faris Al-Rawi	6,638	45.5%	▼
PF	Nnika Ramnanan	450	3.1%	Steady
NTA	Kevin Sarran	44	0.3%	Steady
All People's Party (Trinidad and Tobago)	Denile Joseph	28	0.2%	Steady
NCT	Kathryna Browne	17	0.1%	Steady
Majority		703	4.8%	
Turnout		14,583	57.46%	
Registered electors		25,378		
UNC gain from PNM		Swing	%	
