= 2016 Trinidadian local elections =

- 28 November 2016

All 14 Municipal Corporation Electoral Areas
Turnout
34.34% (▼9.28 pp)
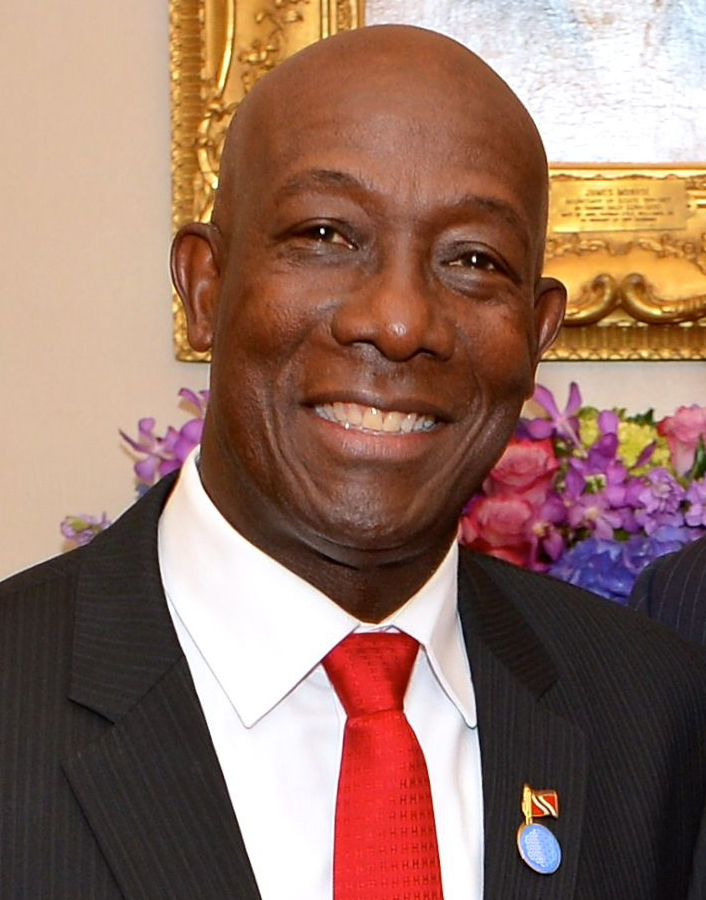

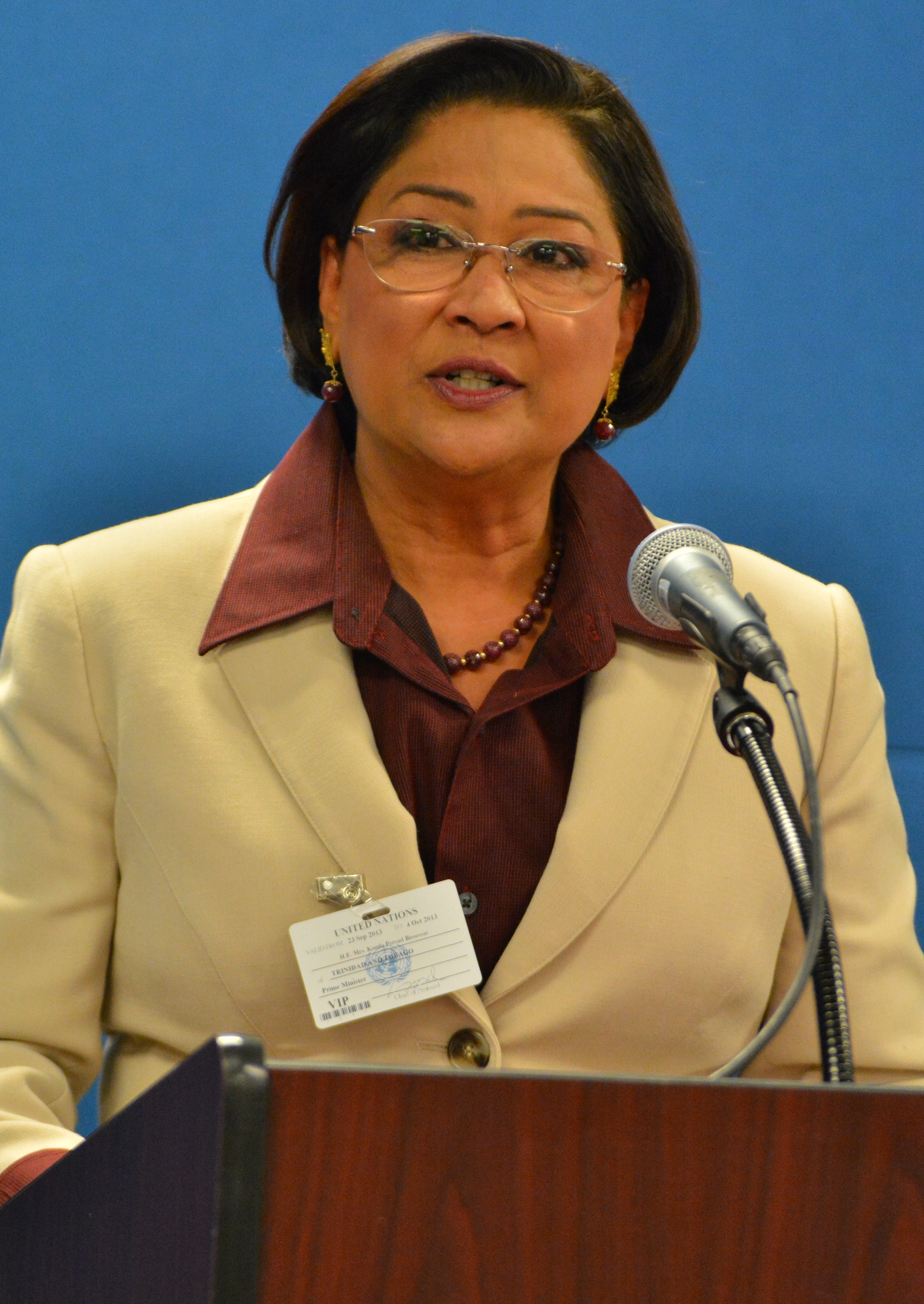
Leader	Keith Rowley	Kamla Persad-Bissesar
Party	PNM	UNC
Leader since	26 May 2010	24 January 2010
Last election	84 councillors, 42.3% 8 municipal corporations	54 councillors, 49.9% 6 municipal corporations
Popular vote	174,754 48.24%	180,758 49.90%
Swing	▲5.96%	▲22.82%
Municipal Corporations	7 / 14	6 / 14
Municipal Corporations +/–	▼1	▲1
Councillors	83 / 137	54 / 137
Councillors +/–	▼3	▲8

On Monday November 28, 2016, local elections were held in Trinidad, the bigger of the two main islands of Caribbean island state Trinidad and Tobago. The elections were held slightly more than one month later than originally planned. They were held to select the membership of 14 local authorities, with representatives elected from 137 single-member districts across the country. The entire membership of Trinidad's local government was renewed as a result of these elections, with the previous set of local representatives having been elected in 2013. The elections came roughly a year following the 2015 parliamentary general election.

Local elections were not held in Tobago, which has an autonomous legislative chamber - the Tobago House of Assembly - in lieu of traditional forms of local government. Elections to the Tobago House of Assembly were held in 2017.

== Electoral system ==
As with elections to the parliament of Trinidad and Tobago, the 137 local representatives up for election were chosen using the First Past the Post system, in which the candidate with the most votes in each district was duly elected. Voters could cast one vote for the candidate of their choice.

== Seats before election ==
Since the 2013 local elections, the Elections and Boundaries Commission has conducted a review of the boundaries for each local corporation. As a consequence, the number of seats overall was enlarged from 136 to 137. Three local corporations saw their membership enlarged by one representative (Tunapuna & Piarco, Siparia and Mayaro & Rio Claro) whilst one authority lost a seat (Penal and Debe). As a result of these boundary changes, comparisons with the 2013 election are somewhat imperfect. Nonetheless, after the 2013 poll the total number of representatives was as follows:

- People's National Movement (PNM): 84 seats; 8 majority administrations
- United National Congress (UNC): 48 seats (49 after a defection from the ILP); 5 majority and 1 minority administration
- Independent Liberal Party (ILP): 3 seats (2 after a defection to the UNC)
- Congress of the People (COP): 1 seat

The UNC contested the 2013 elections in coalition with the COP, nominating 77 candidates to the COP's 52. The PNM won control of eight councils to five for the UNC-lead coalition.

== Candidates ==
A total of 317 candidates nominated themselves to contest the elections by the deadline of November 7, 2016. This represented a sharp decline from the 418 candidates who contested the 2013 local elections. According to the election authorities, three of the UNC's candidates were found ineligible or withdrew themselves before polling day, resulting in a walkover victory for the PNM in one district.

== Results ==
=== Overall ===
In terms of seats and councils won, the elections resulted in a victory for the ruling People's National Movement, which had won the previous year's general election. The PNM successfully defended 83 of the 84 seats it had won in the 2013 local elections and won majority control of seven of the fourteen councils up for election. It lost one council, Sangre Grande, to no overall control after the election there resulted in a 4 - 4 seat split between the two major parties. The PNM subsequently formed a minority administration in the regional corporation after the incumbent local PNM leader, Terry Rondon, controversially used his casting vote to break the tie 5 - 4 in favour of the PNM and re-elect himself chairman. This leaves the PNM in power in eight authorities.

The opposition United National Congress managed only a modest improvement in its tally of councillors, going from 48 to 54, falling far short of the 88 councillors elected in 2010 for the party. The party made a gain of one council by winning five of eight seats in Chaguanas compared to the previous elections. However, the UNC had already governed there in minority following a defection by a councillor from the Independent Liberal Party after the 2013 poll. As such the UNC failed to gain control of any councils from the PNM. Consolation did come for the party in the form of a narrow victory in the popular vote; the UNC captured 50% of the national vote compared to 48% for the PNM.

Minor parties fared extremely poorly in the election. The ILP and the Congress of the People, the only other parties with representation in local government, lost all of their seats and failed to win a significant share of the popular vote. The ILP won just 1.2% of the popular vote in Chaguanas, where the party had previously won a parliamentary seat in a by-election with 69% of the vote (though its share of the vote across Chaguanas had fallen to 3.1% by the 2015 general election).

In eight of fourteen councils, one party won all seats up for grabs. Sangre Grande was the only authority in which no one party won an absolute majority of the popular vote. Recounts occurred in six districts at the request of candidates; none changed the outcome.

Party	Candidates	Votes	%	Seats	+/–	Councils	+/–
People's National Movement	136	174,754	48.24	83 / 137	▼3	7 / 14	▼1
United National Congress	134	180,758	49.90	54 / 137	▲8	6 / 14	▲1
Congress of the People	9	1,803	0.49	0	▼1	0	-
Movement for Social Justice	11	790	0.22	0	-	0	-
Independent Liberal Party	7	343	0.09	0	▼3	0	-
National Solidarity Assembly	9	804	0.22	0	-	-	-
National Democratic Party	3	244	0.07	0	-	-	-
Independent Democratic Party	1	602	0.17	0	-	-	-
Independents	4	1,071	0.30	0	-	-	-
No Overall Control	-	-	-	-	-	1	-
Invalid/blank votes	-	1,085	–	–	–	-	-
Total	314	362,254	100	137	▲1	14	-
Registered voters/turnout	1,054,817	34.3 (▼9.3pp)	–	–	–	–	
Source: EBC

=== By corporation ===
Council	Previous result (2013)	New result (2016)	Change from 2013
Arima	PNM 7 - UNC 0	PNM 7 - UNC 0	PNM Retain
Chaguanas	UNC 3 - PNM 3 - ILP 2 UNC minority	UNC 5 - PNM 3 - ILP 0	UNC Gain from NOC
Point Fortin	PNM 6 - UNC 0	PNM 6 - UNC 0	PNM Retain
Port of Spain	PNM 12 - UNC 0	PNM 12 - UNC 0	PNM Retain
San Fernando	PNM 8 - UNC 0 - COP 1	PNM 9 - UNC 0 - COP 0	PNM Retain
Couva–Tabaquite–Talparo	UNC 13 - PNM 1	UNC 14 - PNM 0	UNC Retain
Diego Martin	PNM 10 - UNC 0	PNM 10 - UNC 0	PNM Retain
Mayaro–Rio Claro	UNC 4 - PNM 2	UNC 4 - PNM 3	UNC Retain
Penal–Debe	UNC 9 - PNM 1	UNC 9 - PNM 0	UNC Retain
Princes Town	UNC 8 - PNM 2	UNC 9 - PNM 1	UNC Retain
San Juan–Laventille	PNM 12 - UNC 1	PNM 11 - UNC 2	PNM Retain
Sangre Grande	PNM 7 - UNC 0	PNM 4 - UNC 4 PNM minority	NOC Gain from PNM
Siparia	UNC 5 - PNM 3	UNC 5 - PNM 4	UNC Retain
Tunapuna–Piarco	PNM 12 - UNC 2 - ILP 1	PNM 12 - UNC 4 - ILP 0	PNM Retain
Source: EBC
