= San Fernando West =

Trinidad and Tobago parliamentary constituency

- Constituency for the Parliament of Trinidad and Tobago
- Electorate: 24,493 (2015)
- Major settlements: San Fernando

Current constituency
- Created: 1956
- Number of members: 1
- Member of Parliament: Michael Dowlath (UNC)
- Created from: San Fernando

San Fernando West is a parliamentary electoral district in comprising the western part of the city of San Fernando, Trinidad and Tobago. It came into effect in time for the 1956 Trinidad and Tobago general election.

== Members of Parliament ==
This constituency has elected the following members of the House of Representatives of Trinidad and Tobago:

Election	Years	Member	Party	Notes
1956	24 September 1956–4 December 1961	Winston Mahabir	PNM	
1961	4 December 1961–7 November 1966	Saied Mohammed	PNM	
1966	7 November 1966–15 December 1986	Errol E. Mahabir	PNM	
1986	15 December 1986–16 December 1991	Anselm St. George	NAR	
1991	16 December 1991–6 November 1995	Ralph Maraj	PNM	
1995	6 November 1995–11 December 2000	Barendra Sinanan	PNM	
2000	11 December 2000–7 October 2002	Sadiq Baksh	UNC	
2002	7 October 2002–5 November 2007	Diane Seukeran	PNM	
2007	5 November 2007–24 May 2010	Junia Regrello	PNM	
2010	24 May 2010–7 September 2015	Carolyn Seepersad-Bachan	COP	
2015	7 September 2015–present	Faris Al-Rawi	PNM	
2025	3 May 2025–present	Michael Dowlath	UNC	

== Election results ==
=== Elections in the 2020s ===
2025 Trinidad and Tobago general election: San Fernando West
Party	Candidate	Votes	%	±%
UNC	Michael Dowlath	7,341	50.3%	▲
PNM	Faris Al-Rawi	6,638	45.5%	▼
PF	Nnika Ramnanan	450	3.1%	Steady
NTA	Kevin Sarran	44	0.3%	Steady
All People's Party (Trinidad and Tobago)	Denile Joseph	28	0.2%	Steady
NCT	Kathryna Browne	17	0.1%	Steady
Majority		703	4.8%	
Turnout		14,583	57.46%	
Registered electors		25,378		
UNC gain from PNM		Swing	%	

General election 2020: San Fernando West
Party	Candidate	Votes	%	±%
PNM	Faris Al-Rawi	8,459	54.31	
UNC	Sean Sobers	6,754	43.36	
Progressive	Nikoli Edwards	212	1.36	
PEP	Benison Jagessar	128	0.82	
TNP	Valmiki Ramsingh	23	0.15	
Majority		1,705	10.95	
Turnout		15,576	62.22	
PNM hold		Swing		

=== Elections in the 2010s ===
General election 2015: San Fernando West
Party	Candidate	Votes	%	±%
PNM	Faris Al-Rawi	10,112	59.24	
UNC	Raziah Ahmed	6,802	39.85	
Independent	Jowelle de Souza	108	0.63	
ILP	Joseph Mendes	47	0.28	
Majority		3,310	19.39	
Turnout		17,116	69.88	
PNM gain from COP		Swing		

General election 2010: San Fernando West
Party	Candidate	Votes	%	±%
COP	Carolyn Seepersad-Bachan	9,111	53.13	
PNM	Junia Regrello	7,860	45.84	
NNV	Indrani Abu Bakr	128	0.75	
Majority		1,251	7.29	
Turnout		17,148	72.80	
COP gain from PNM		Swing		
