= Jayanti Lutchmedial =

Trinidad and Tobago politician

The Honourable Jayanti Lutchmedial Senator

Member of the Senate of Trinidad and Tobago
- Incumbent
- Assumed office 28 August 2020

Personal details
- Party: United National Congress (UNC)

Jayanti Lutchmedial-Ramdial (née Lutchmedial) is a Trinidad and Tobago politician from the United National Congress.

== Early life ==
Her parents Lorraine Lutchmedial and Ramchand Lutchmedial both worked in the legal profession.

== Political career ==
She was appointed to the Senate as an opposition senator after the 2020 Trinidad and Tobago general election. Lutchmedial attempted to be screened for selection to be the candidate for San Fernando West in the 2025 Trinidad and Tobago general election, but she was not selected. She attempted to be selected for Naparima in the 2025 Trinidad and Tobago general election but Narindra Roopnarine was chosen instead.

== Legal issues ==
In July 2025, she will attend a defamation trial with Minister Foster Cummings.

== Personal life ==
On 27 January 2024, she married her husband Dirk Ramdial. She is the mother of a daughter.
