= Jowelle de Souza =

Trinidad and Tobago activist

Jowelle De Souza (born May 12, 1974) is a hairdresser and community organizer active in San Fernando, Trinidad and Tobago. She is well known for being an activist for gay and transgender rights and animal welfare. She is a successful business owner known for being the first transgender woman to sue the government for harassment. Jowelle de Souza has since become involved in national politics, championing the revitalization of San Fernando. In February 2022, she was sworn in as the country's first openly trans Senator.

== Legal biography ==
Police arrested De Souza and charged her with assault in March 1997 after she pushed a photographer. She said the photographer knew all about her past and was taking pictures of her without permission. De Souza said that after officer George took her to the police station, he and other male officers taunted her for hours about her sexuality. The men insisted on searching her, even though her identification and appearance indicated she was a woman. They eventually relented but insisted on having a female officer strip-search De Souza. "There was no legal right to search," she said. "I pushed (the photographer). I didn't assault him with a deadly weapon."

De Souza sought legal counsel, and hired prominent lawyers Lynette Maharaj. De Souza won the case and gave her awarded money to charity.

== Political career ==
Early in 2015, Jowelle De Souza became a prominent part of the movement to establish a stronger independent presence in Trinidad and Tobago's political system. In early 2015, she launched her campaign to represent San Fernando West as an independent Member of Parliament. When asked by the Trinidad Express about some of her major issues of her platform, she responded, “I believe in equal opportunities for all: the disabled, the senior citizens, single mother, the impoverished.” When asked why she would run as an Independent De Souza answered, "I want to effectively represent the people without any biases or scenarios where others who may not be on the same page are pulling strings or controlling actions. You see, many people vote party and not person but the reality is you must vote for persons who can impartially assure the well-being of the country." During her campaign, she has also publicly expressed concern for access to labor markets in the Greater San Fernando area and revitalization of its infrastructure and waterfront. Despite the large swell of support De Souza has received in the San Fernando community, her political aspirations have been met with vocal disdain from the religious community in Trinidad and Tobago, whose objections focus primarily on her gender identity.

On February 15, 2022, De Souza became Trinidad and Tobago's first openly trans Senator. She was sworn to fill in for Senator Jayanti Lutchmedial.

== Personal life ==
In 1993, at age 19 she underwent gender confirmation or sex reassignment surgery in Trinidad, the first person in Trinidad to have this surgery. De Souza is an activist for animal rights, and encourages people to care for animals. De Souza was awarded the bronze Hummingbird Medal in 2014 for her work ensuring animal welfare. Additionally, she has been involved in professional development workshops on updating techniques in the hair care industry in Trinidad.
