= Diego Martin North/East =

Trinidad and Tobago parliamentary constituency

- Constituency for the Parliament of Trinidad and Tobago
- Electorate: 29,273(2020)

Current constituency
- Created: 2007
- Number of members: 1
- Member of Parliament: Colm Imbert (PNM)

Diego Martin North/East is a parliamentary electoral district in Trinidad and Tobago in the north-west of Trinidad. It has been represented since the 2007 general election by Colm Imbert of the People's National Movement (PNM). Until 2007, it was known as Diego Martin East.

== Constituency profile ==
The constituency was created prior to the 2007 general election from the former constituency of Diego Martin East. It borders the constituencies of Diego Martin West, Diego Martin Central, St. Ann's East, Port of Spain North/St. Ann's West, and Port of Spain South. The main towns are Dibe and Maraval. It had an electorate of 17,145 as of 2015.

== Member of Parliament ==
This constituency has elected the following member of the House of Representatives of Trinidad and Tobago:

Diego Martin East
Election	Years	Member	Party	Notes
1966	1966–1976	Karl Hudson-Phillips	PNM	
1976	1976–1986	Norma Lewis-Phillip	PNM	
1986	1986–1991	Anthony Smart	NAR	
1991	1991 – 5 November 2007	Colm Imbert	PNM	
Diego Martin North/East
2007	5 November 2007 – Present	Colm Imbert	PNM	

== Election results ==
=== Elections in the 2020s ===
2025 Trinidad and Tobago general election: Diego Martin North/East
Party	Candidate	Votes	%	±%
PNM	Colm Imbert	7,064	56.0%	▼17.92
PEP	Brendon Butts	3,525	28.0%	▲24.85
PF	Chelsie Cedeno	708	5.6%	Steady
NTA	Salim George	565	4.5%	Steady
MND	Garvin Nicholas	556	4.4%	▲2.89
All People's Party (Trinidad and Tobago)	Christine Soden	145	1.2%	Steady
Majority		3,539	28.0%	▼25.47
Turnout		12,612	42.22%	
Registered electors		29,869		
PNM hold				

General election 2020: Diego Martin North/East
Party	Candidate	Votes	%	±%
PNM	Colm Imbert	10,218	73.92	
UNC	Eli Zakour	2,827	20.45	
PEP	Phillip Edward Alexander	436	3.15	
MND	Myron John Clayton Bruce	209	1.51	
COP	Lonsdale Leon Williams	133	0.96	
Majority		7,391	53.47	
Turnout		13,823	47.22	
PNM hold		Swing		

=== Elections in the 2010s ===
General election 2015: Diego Martin North/East
Party	Candidate	Votes	%	±%
PNM	Colm Imbert	12,015	70.4	
UNC	Garvin Nicholas	4,949	28.99	
NNV	Saaleha Zawadi Abu Bakr	103	0.6	
Majority		7,066	41.4	
Turnout		17,067	60.8	
PNM hold		Swing		

General election 2010: Diego Martin North/East
Party	Candidate	Votes	%	±%
PNM	Colm Imbert	8,539	50.8	
UNC	Garvin Nicholas	8,076	48.05	
NNV	Melissa Ochoa	126	0.75	
Majority		463	2.75	
Turnout		16,809	60.8	
PNM hold		Swing		
