= Lionel Frank Seukeran =

Trinidad and Tobago politician (1908-1992)

Legislative Council for Naparima
- In office 1956–1961

House of Representatives for Naparima
- In office 1961–1966

Personal details
- Born: Parasnath Lakshmi Prashad Sharma; 12 January 1908 Tableland, Trinidad and Tobago
- Died: 15 December 1992 (aged 84)
- Party: Independent; Democratic Liberation Party; Seukeran Independent Party; Democratic Labour Party
- Relations: Faris Al-Rawi (grandson)
- Education: Naparima Training College
- Awards: Chaconia Gold Medal (1985)
- Nickname: Seukie

Lionel Frank Seukeran (né Parasnath Lakshmi Prashad Sharma; 12 January 1908-15 December 1992), also stylised as L. F. Seukeran, was a politician and businessman. Born to a devout Hindu family in Tableland, Trinidad and Tobago, he converted to Christianity in order to access education and employment at institutions run by the Presbyterian Church. He was elected to the Legislative Council as an independent in 1956 and to the House of Representatives as a member of the Democratic Labour Party (DLP) in 1961. Seukeran participated in the 1962 negotiations in London for Trinidad's independence. He was known for his eloquence and for his leadership in the opposition to the People's National Movement (PNM) party. The government recognized him with the Chaconia Gold Medal in 1985. His autobiography, Mr. Speaker Sir, was published in 2006.

== Early life and education ==
Seukeran was born Parasnath Lakshmi Prashad Sharma in Tableland, Trinidad and Tobago on January 12, 1908. His family were Indo-Trinidadian Brahmin Hindus, and his father was a Pandit named Seukeran Sharma. According to family stories, Seukeran Sharma attended Banaras Hindu University in India (Note: Banares University was not founded until 1916, so this may refer to its predecessor, Central Hindu College) and was fooled into traveling to Trinidad as an indentured laborer in the early 1900s. Sharma sometimes hosted traveling Taan singers in his home in Tableland, where they performed for the village. As a child, Seukeran attended Christian schools and learned Sanskrit and Hindi from his father.

Seukeran and his brother, like other Hindus of the time period, converted to Christianity because it enabled them to obtain jobs and education at Christian institutions. He took the name Lionel Frank Seukeran, later writing: "It was the price we had to pay for acceptance and for the possibility of advancement." He attended the Naparima Training College, a training school for teachers that was founded by the Presbyterian Church. Although the student body only admitted Christians, Seukeran considered it to be culturally diverse. In his autobiography, he wrote about helping a fellow student convert back to Hinduism after the student was expelled.Seukeran also returned to Hinduism. He worked at several Canadian Mission (CM) schools run by the Presbyterian Church, including Elswick.

== Political and Business Career ==
Suekeran was a business owner in San Fernando. He was also President General of the All Trinidad Sugar and General Workers Trade Union and a member of the Sugar Industry Labour Welfare Fund Committee. His political career began in 1946, when he became a member of the San Fernando Borough Council. In 1950, he ran as an independent for a seat in the Legislative Council but lost to Ashford Sinanan.

=== First term in parliament (1956-1961) ===
In 1956, Seukeran ran as an independent to represent Naparima in the Legislative Council. During the election, he was accused of opposing the Sanatan Dharma Maha Sabha, an influential Hindu organization. He responded: "I am a Brahmin and the son of a Brahmin. Seven generations of Brahmin blood flows in my veins. I know more Sanskrit and Hindi than all the Pandits in Debe....Seukeran will be the defender of the Maha Sabha." He won the election.

In 1957, the Democratic Labour Party (DLP) formed in opposition to the dominant People's National Movement (PNM) party. DLP was seen as the Indian party while PNM was viewed as the Black party. After the DLP won multiple seats in the 1958 elections, PNM leader Eric Williams made a speech criticizing a range of groups, including the DLP and Indo-Trinidadians whom he called a “hostile and recalcitrant minority”. Seukeran called a motion to censure Williams for his anti-Indian statements. After Williams made a statement affirming his opposition to racism, some other members of parliament convinced Seukeran to drop the motion to avoid aggravating racial tensions in the country.

In 1960, Seukeran criticized an aid package that Williams got from the United States in exchange for allowing American military bases to remain in Chaguaramas, calling it a "miserable pittance". He stated that other countries were able to negotiate better deals with the United States and called the agreement "a gross betrayal".

=== Second term in parliament (1961-1966) ===
In 1961, he was elected to the House of Representatives where he again represented Naparima. In January 1962, Seukeran blamed Williams for Jamaica's withdrawal from the West Indies Federation which contributed to the collapse of the Federation.Seukeran was part of a May 1962 delegation to London to negotiate Trinidad and Tobago's independence from Britain, which officially happened that August. In his autobiography, he described DLP leader Rudranath Capildeo as "mad" and "volatile by nature, incapable of compromise". Seukeran wrote that Capildeo wanted proportional representation for Indo-Trinidadians and that the other delegates had to pressure Capildeo to take more moderate positions. According to Seukeran, the DLP delegation negotiated the inclusion of key political rights in the constitution, including freedom of speech and religion. In 1964, Seukeran called on politician Learie Constantine to reject the British government’s offer of peerage, because it would require Constantine to forfeit his Trinidadian citizenship, "which so many people have striven for several years to obtain".

In 1963, Stephen Maharaj was chosen to represent the DLP as the Leader of the Opposition and the party adopted Democratic Socialism. Seukeran opposed the new policies and did not follow Maharaj's leadership. Amid rising tensions within the DLP, Seukeran broke with party leadership to vote in favor of the 1965 Industrial Stabilisation Act which greatly restricted labor strikes. His vote may have been due to his relationship with the sugar industry. Seukeran left the DLP and again became an independent. In the 1966 election, Trinidad's first election as an independent country, Seukeran lost to the DLP.

=== Later career ===
In 1971, Seukeran and two other former members of the Democratic Labour Party, Bhadase Maraj and Stephen Maharaj, co-founded the Democratic Liberation Party. They did not win any seats in the election. He was awarded the Chaconia Gold Medal by the government of Trinidad and Tobago in 1985. In 1991, Seukeran published an article about Eric Williams, stating: "Trinidad and Tobago and the West Indies will long remember his genius, this brilliant son of the soil, for the sense of direction he gave us all and for the tireless service he rendered the region."

== Personal life and legacy ==
Seukeran's wife, Ruth, also served on the San Fernando Borough Council. They had six children. Ruth wore saris; and, according to their daughters, Seukeran was "very Indian at home". Political analyst Ferdie Ferreira called him "one of the very few complete Trinbagonians, who certainly enjoyed every aspect of what the country of his birth had to offer... He was as comfortable with the culture of his forefathers as he was with what has emerged as our national culture."

Seukeran died on December 15, 1992. He was considered a leader of the opposition to the PNM and part of the "first generation of significant Indo-Trinidadian leaders on a national level". Seukeran was known for his debate and speaking skills, which earned him the name "silver-tongued orator". During his first term in parliament, he once accused a fellow member of being: "guilty of tedious repetition and monumental irrelevance." He was also nicknamed "Seukie".

Seukeran's autobiography, Mr. Speaker Sir, was published in 2006. His daughter Diane Seukeran and his grandson Faris Al-Rawi have represented San Fernando West in Parliament. Al-Rawi has also served as attorney general.
