= Narindra Roopnarine =

Trinidad and Tobago politician

The Honourable Narindra Roopnarine MP

Member of Parliament for Naparima
- Incumbent
- Assumed office 3 May 2025
- Preceded by: Rodney Charles

Personal details
- Party: UNC

Narindra Roopnarine is a Trinidad and Tobago politician from the United National Congress (UNC). He has been MP for Naparima in the House of Representatives since 2025.

== Career ==
Roopnarine is a doctor from the town of Penal. Roopnarine was selected to succeed Rodney Charles in the seat of Naparima over senator Jayanti Lutchmedial. After the election he was appointed Parliamentary Secretary in the Ministry of Culture and Community Development by Prime Minister Kamla Persad-Bissessar.

== Personal life ==
Roopnarine is married to Roshni Roopnarine.

== Electoral history ==
2025 Trinidad and Tobago general election: Naparima
Party	Candidate	Votes	%	±%
UNC	Narindra Roopnarine	13,649	86.4%	▲
PNM	Sarah Nangoo	1,650	10.4%	▼
PF	Fariyal Mohammed-Lalchan	462	2.9%	Steady
Majority		11,999	76.0%	
Turnout		15,799	58.19%	
Registered electors		27,150		
UNC hold		Swing	%	

== See also ==
- 13th Republican Parliament of Trinidad and Tobago
