= Norma Lewis-Phillip =

Politician from Trinidad and Tobago

MP for Diego Martin East
- In office 24 September 1976 – 29 October 1986
- Preceded by: Karl Hudson-Phillips
- Succeeded by: Anthony Smart

Personal details
- Political party: People's National Movement

Norma Lewis-Phillip was a Trinidad and Tobago politician from the People's National Movement (PNM). She is considered a trailblazing female politician in the country.

== See also ==
- List of Trinidad and Tobago Members of Parliament
