= Independent Liberal Party (Trinidad and Tobago) =

- Founder: Jack Warner
- Founded: 7 July 2013
- Dissolved: July 2023
- Split from: United National Congress
- Merged into: United National Congress
- Colors: Green

Website
- www.ilptnt.com//

The Independent Liberal Party was a political party of Trinidad and Tobago. It was formed in July 2013, after Jack Warner was not reselected as the candidate for the Chaguanas West by-election for the United National Congress (UNC) party. It was launched at a political rally, in Jubilee Grounds, Pierre Road, Chaguanas.

Founder Jack Warner resigned in September, 2015 following the party's defeat in the 2015 general election. He was replaced by attorney Rekha Ramjit, who had previously served as the party's chairman, and who defeated Simeon Mahabir in a 10 October 2015 internal party election.

== Campaigns ==
=== Chaguanas West by-election 2013 ===
Jack Austin Warner fought the Chaguanas West by-election on 29 July 2013, and won, beating out the closest candidate Kadijah Ameen by a 2 to 1 margin.

Candidate	Party	Votes	%
Jack Warner	Independent Liberal Party	12,642	69.26
Khadijah Ameen	United National Congress	5,130	28.10
Avinash Singh	People's National Movement	426	2.33
Kirk Meighoo	Democratic National Assembly	35	0.19
Oliver Norman	National Coalition for Transformation	21	0.12
Total		18,254	100.00
Valid votes		18,254	99.75
Invalid/blank votes		45	0.25
Total votes		18,299	100.00
Registered voters/turnout		27,045	67.66
Source: EBCTT

=== 2013 Local Government elections ===
The party contested 136 electoral districts in the local government elections on October 21, 2013. They won 102,918 votes and 3 seats: two at the Chaguanas Borough Corporation and one at the Tunapuna/Piarco Regional Corporation. During the elections for both Mayor and Deputy Mayor at the deadlocked Chaguanas Borough Corporation on November 6, 2013, one of the elected ILP councillors, Faaiq Mohammed chose to vote for UNC candidate Vandana Mohit over the ILP's candidate Falisha Isahak citing 600 constituents signed a petition objecting to the appointment of Isahak. Mohammed was accused by Warner for taking a $2.5 million bribe from the UNC and was expelled from the ILP. A defamation claim was brought against Warner that Mohammed won in 2014.

=== 2015 general elections ===
The party contested 26 out of 41 seats in the 2015 General Elections held on 7 September 2015 but failed to win a seat. As a result of the party defeat at the polls, Warner resigned as political leader of the ILP.

=== 2016 Local Government elections ===
The ILP offered only seven candidates but lost all of their seats during the 2016 Local Government Elections. They did not contest the 2019 local government elections.

=== 2020 general elections ===
Founder Jack Warner announced that he would re-enter politics and contest the Lopinot/Bon Air West seat for the August 10th general elections. Despite expressing strong confidence that he could win the seat and possibly be the tie-breaker in the event of an electoral deadlock, Warner lost to People's National Movement (PNM) candidate Marvin Gonzales. After the People's National Movement declared victory at the polls, Warner announced his retirement from politics while the political leader of the ILP Rekha Ramjit resigned.
