= 2013 Trinidadian local elections =

- 21 October 2013

All 14 Municipal Corporation Electoral Areas
- Opinion polls
Turnout
43.6% (▲4.5 pp)
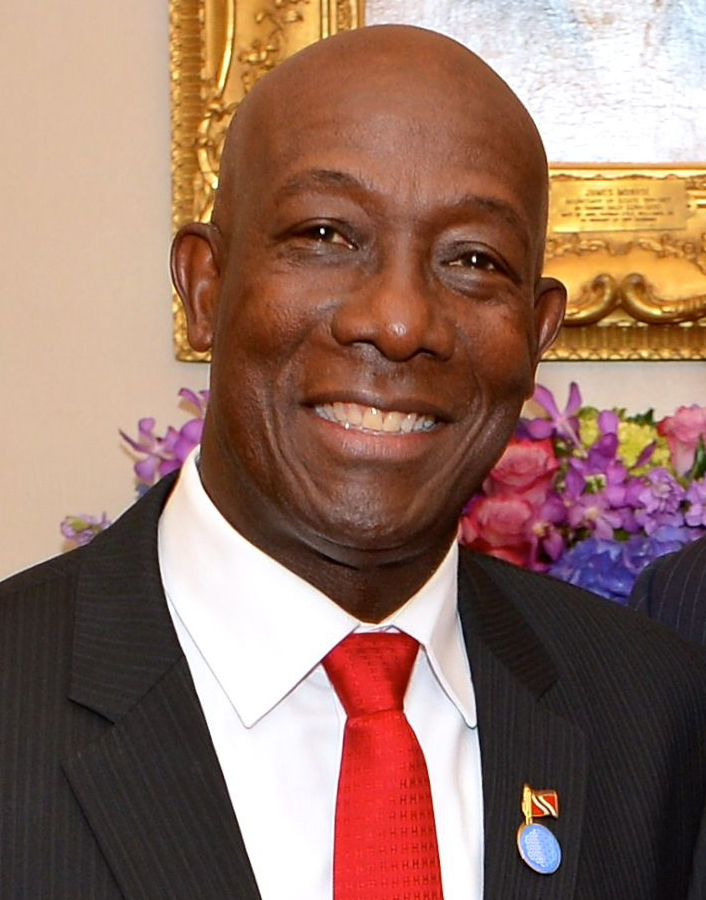

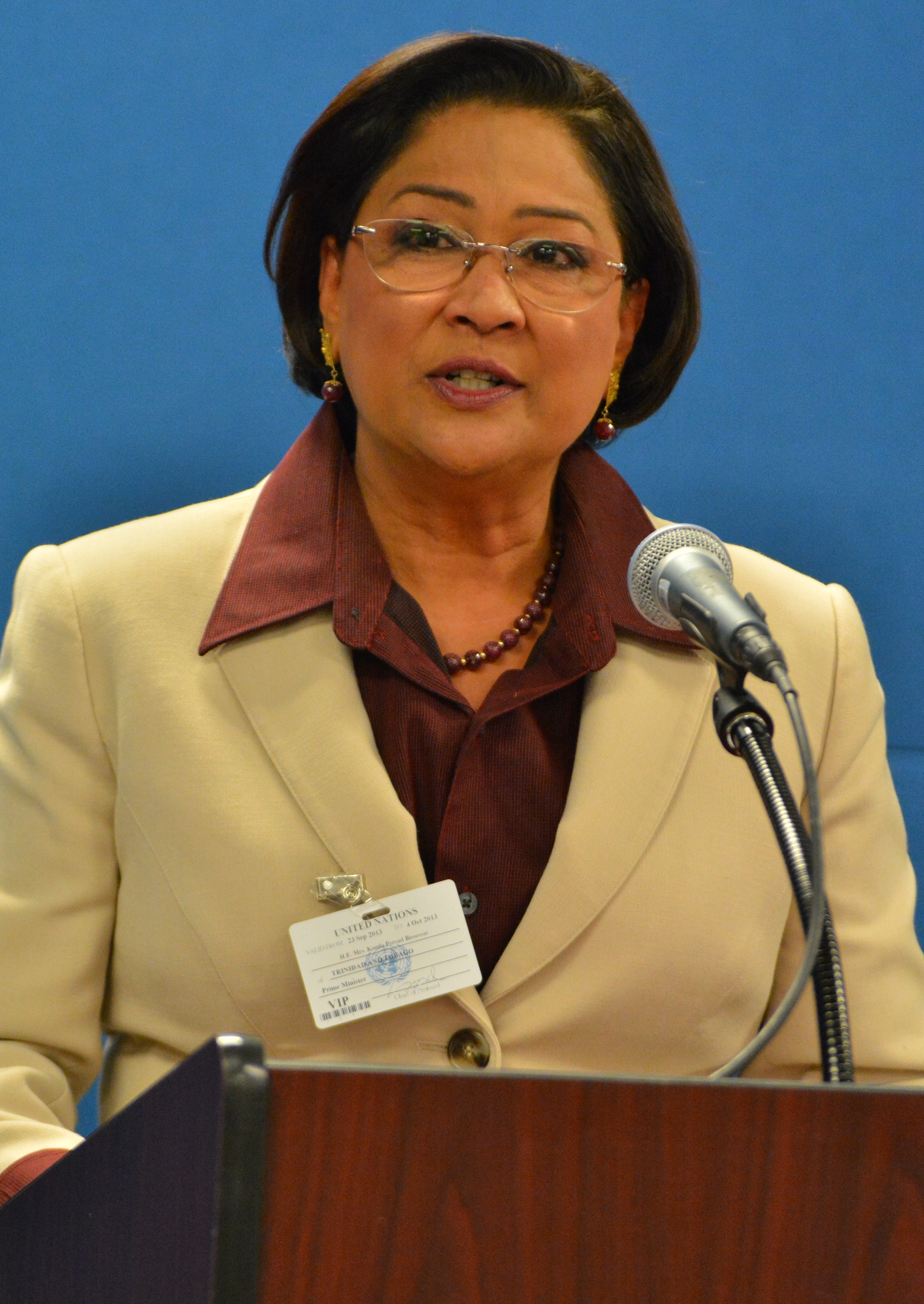

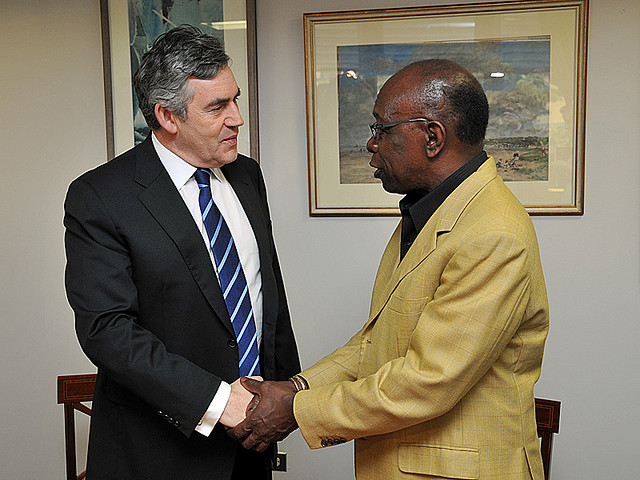
Leader	Keith Rowley	Kamla Persad-Bissesar
Party	PNM	UNC
Alliance		PP
Leader since	26 May 2010	24 January 2010
Last election	36 councillors, 33.55% 3 municipal corporations	74 councillors, 52.02% 10 municipal corporations
Popular vote	190,421 42.28%	121,944 27.08%
Swing	▲8.73%	▼24.94%
Municipal Corporations	8 / 14	6 / 14
Municipal Corporations +/–	▲5	▼3
Councillors	84 / 136	46 / 136
Councillors +/–	▲48	▼28
		COP
Leader	Jack Warner	Prakash Ramadhar
Party	ILP	COP
Alliance		PP
Leader since	24 January 2010	3 July 2011
Last election	New party	24 councillors, 14.00% 5 municipal corporations
Popular vote	102,304 22.72%	33,258 7.39%
Swing	New party	▼6.61%
Municipal Corporations	0 / 14	0 / 14
Municipal Corporations +/–	New party	▼2
Councillors	3 / 136	3 / 136
Councillors +/–	3	▼21

The 2013 Trinidadian local elections were held on 21 October 2013 to elect representatives in all 14 municipal corporation electoral areas in Trinidad. 136 seats were contested. These were the first elections held after the Municipal Corporations Amendment Act of 2013, which also provided for four aldermen in each corporation to be allocated by proportional representation. The People's National Movement was victorious in the election, winning the plurality of the vote and the majority of Municipal Corporations.

== Election date ==
- Elections come due 26 July 2013. However, as these elections are not part of the Trinidad & Tobago Constitution, they can be delayed by Parliament .
- 21 October 2013 has been announced as the date of the election.
- Nomination Day is 30 September 2013

== Seats ==
- Seats are determined by the EBC ( Elections and Boundaries Commission ), in the 2010 elections there were 134 seats in 14 areas. In the 2013 election there will be 136 seats in 14 areas. Additionally, under the Municipal Corporations Amendment Act 2013, there will now be 4 aldermen in each of the 14 areas. Each party will be allocated aldermen based on proportional representation.

== Results ==
The Elections and Boundaries Commission recorded the highest voter turnout in history for a local government election. Eight municipal corporations were won by the opposition People's National Movement, five municipal corporations were won by the ruling People's Partnership, and the Chaguanas Municipal Corporation was divided 3-3-2 between PNM, UNC and ILP respectively. An ILP councilor later crossed the floor, giving the UNC control of the Chaguanas Borough Corporation.

Regional Corporations won by the People's National Movement:

Port-Of-Spain: PNM 12, People's Partnership 0

San Fernando: PNM:8 COP:1

Arima: PNM 7, People's Partnership 0

Point Fortin: PNM 6, People's Partnership 0

Diego Martin: PNM 10, People's Partnership 0.

SanJuan/Laventille: PNM 12, People's Partnership 1.

Tunapuna/Piarco: PNM 12, People's Partnership 2, Independent Liberal Party 1.

Sangre Grande: PNM 5, People's Partnership 3

Regional Corporations won by the People's Partnership:

Mayaro/Rio Claro: People's Partnership 4, PNM 2.

Couva/Tabaquite/Talparo: People's Partnership 13, PNM 1

Penal/Debe: People's Partnership 9 PNM 1

Princes Town: People's Partnership 8, PNM 2

Siparia: People's Partnership 5, PNM 3

Chaguanas: PNM 3, People's Partnership 3, Independent Liberal Party 2.
