= Naparima (parliamentary constituency) =

Trinidad and Tobago parliamentary constituency

- Constituency for the Parliament of Trinidad and Tobago
- Naparima is number 33 on this map
- Electorate: 26,527 (2015)
- Major settlements: Naparima Plain

Current constituency
- Created: 1956
- Number of members: 1
- Member of Parliament: Narindra Roopnarine (UNC)

Naparima is a parliamentary constituency in Trinidad and Tobago.

== Geography ==
The constituency is named after the Naparima Plain. It had an electorate of 26,527 as of 2010.

== Members ==
Election	Member	Party	Notes
1956	Lionel Seukeran	Ind.	
1961	Lionel Seukeran	DLP	
Constituency not in use
1976	Boodram Jattan	ULF	
1981	Emanuel Hosein	ULF	
1986	Raymond Palackdharrysingh	NAR	
1991	Subhas Panday	UNC	
1995	Ralph Maraj	UNC	
2000	Ralph Maraj	UNC	
2001	Nizam Baksh	UNC	
2002	Nizam Baksh	UNC	
2007	Nizam Baksh	UNC	
2010	Nizam Baksh	UNC	
2015	Rodney Charles	UNC	
2020	Rodney Charles	UNC	
2025	Narindra Roopnarine	UNC	

== Elections ==
2025 Trinidad and Tobago general election: Naparima
Party	Candidate	Votes	%	±%
UNC	Narindra Roopnarine	13,649	86.4%	▲
PNM	Sarah Nangoo	1,650	10.4%	▼
PF	Fariyal Mohammed-Lalchan	462	2.9%	Steady
Majority		11,999	76.0%	
Turnout		15,799	58.19%	
Registered electors		27,150		
UNC hold		Swing	%	
