= Citizens' Alliance (Trinidad and Tobago) =

Citizens Alliance is a defunct political party in Trinidad and Tobago. Former finance minister Wendell Mottley was leader and businessman Peter George was deputy leader. In the 2002 general election, the party received 5,955 votes (1.0%) and captured no seats.

Citizens Alliance attempted to position itself as a multi-racial alternative to the two dominant political parties, the People's National Movement and the United National Congress.

== See also ==
- List of political parties in Trinidad and Tobago
