= Michael Dowlath =

Trinidad and Tobago educator and politician

The Honourable Michael Dowlath MP

MP for San Fernando West
- Incumbent
- Assumed office 3 May 2025
- Preceded by: Faris Al-Rawi

Personal details
- Party: United National Congress (UNC)

Michael Dowlath is a Trinidad and Tobago educator and politician who is the Member of Parliament for San Fernando West. Dowlath previously served as principal of Naparima College and Iere High School.

== Early life and education ==
Dowlath was born into "a family of teachers", and received his education at Penal Rock Presbyterian Primary School and Naparima College. He graduated from the University of the West Indies with a degree in chemistry and biochemistry and a diploma in education. He later earned a Master's in education and a Ph.D. in education.

== Professional career ==
Dowlath taught at Iere High School from 1987 to 2006, and served as principal of the school. In 2006 he was appointed principal of Naparima College and retired from that position in 2021.

== Political career ==
Dowlath was selected by the United National Congress as their candidate for the San Fernando West seat on November 29, 2024. He contested the seat in the 2025 general elections, beating incumbent People's National Movement candidate Faris Al-Rawi.

== Electoral record ==
2025 Trinidad and Tobago general election: San Fernando West
Party	Candidate	Votes	%	±%
UNC	Michael Dowlath	7,341	50.3%	▲
PNM	Faris Al-Rawi	6,638	45.5%	▼
PF	Nnika Ramnanan	450	3.1%	Steady
NTA	Kevin Sarran	44	0.3%	Steady
All People's Party (Trinidad and Tobago)	Denile Joseph	28	0.2%	Steady
NCT	Kathryna Browne	17	0.1%	Steady
Majority		703	4.8%	
Turnout		14,583	57.46%	
Registered electors		25,378		
UNC gain from PNM		Swing	%	
