= Rodney Charles =

Trinidad and Tobago politician

The Honourable Rodney Charles

Member of Parliament for Naparima
- In office 23 September 2015 – 18 March 2025
- Preceded by: Nizam Baksh
- Succeeded by: Narindra Roopnarine

Personal details
- Born: 1950 (age 75–76)
- Party: United National Congress (UNC)

Rodney Charles (born 1950) is a Trinidad and Tobago politician from the United National Congress (UNC). He represented Naparima in the House of Representatives from 2015 to 2025. He was re-elected in the 2020 Trinidad and Tobago general election. He did not contest the 2025 Trinidad and Tobago general election. He cited his age saying “we must discard once and for all the notion that one has to leave (Trinidad and Tobago) politics either in ignominy or in a casket”. He was succeeded by Narindra Roopnarine.

== See also ==
- 11th Republican Parliament of Trinidad and Tobago
- 12th Republican Parliament of Trinidad and Tobago
