= People's Voice Party (Trinidad and Tobago) =

The People's Voice Party was a political party in Trinidad and Tobago. It contested the 1995 general elections, but received just 16 votes and failed to win a seat. The party did not contest any further elections.
