= Anthony Smart =

Trinidadian politician

Attorney General of Trinidad and Tobago
- In office 1989–1991
- Prime Minister: A. N. R. Robinson
- Preceded by: Selwyn Richardson
- Succeeded by: Keith Sobion

Member of Parliament for Diego Martin North/East
- In office 1986–1991
- Preceded by: Norma Lewis-Phillip
- Succeeded by: Colm Imbert
- Majority: 9,110 votes (62.93%)

Personal details
- Born: Anthony Isidore Smart Trinidad and Tobago
- Party: Organisation for National Reconstruction (ONR); National Alliance for Reconstruction (NAR)
- Education: Fatima College; University of Toronto

Anthony Isidore Smart is a Trinidadian politician and lawyer. He served as a Member of Parliament from December 1986 to November 1991 and Attorney General of Trinidad and Tobago from March 1989 to November 1991. He was also Political Leader of the National Alliance for Reconstruction (NAR) from April 2000 to November 2001. He has been chairman of the First Citizens Bank since June 17, 2014.

== Personal life ==
He is son of Isidore Smart, a former Chief State Solicitor of Trinidad and Tobago from 1965 to 1976. He attended the secondary school of Fatima College in Port of Spain from January 1958 to June 1964. Smart graduated from the University of Toronto with a BA in Economics. He is brother of Wayne Smart, a cricketer who played for the Trinidad and Tobago national cricket team.

== Political life ==
Smart was a founding member of the Organisation for National Reconstruction (ONR) in November 1980 and the National Alliance for Reconstruction (NAR) in July 1985.

Smart contested the Diego Martin North/East in the 1986 General Elections held on December 15, 1986, with the NAR political party, led by A. N. R. Robinson. He defeated incumbent Norma Lewis-Phillip of the People's National Movement (PNM) with 9,110 votes (62.93%) to be elected to the House of Representatives in the 3rd Republican Parliament of Trinidad and Tobago. The NAR won 33 of the 36 seats to form the Government. Smart served at Deputy Speaker from January 12, 1987, to June 12, 1987, and Minister in the Office of the Attorney General and Office of the Prime Minister from June 13, 1987, to February 28, 1989. He was appointed Attorney General on March 1, 1989.

Smart was Attorney General during the 1990 attempted coup when the Jamaat al Muslimeen attempted to overthrow the Government of Trinidad and Tobago. Smart, who was at the Red House attending a cocktail party, disguised himself to escape being held hostage during the event. He was the only elected member of the government to escape capture on the first day during the initial hostage taking in the Parliament Chamber on July 27, 1990 - other members were released five to six days later.

In the 1991 general elections held on December 16, 1991, Smart lost his seat to Colm Imbert of the PNM who won the election with 7,111 votes (54.98%) compared to Smart's 5,280 votes (40.82%).
