= Colm Imbert =

Trinidad and Tobago politician

The Honourable Colm Imbert MP
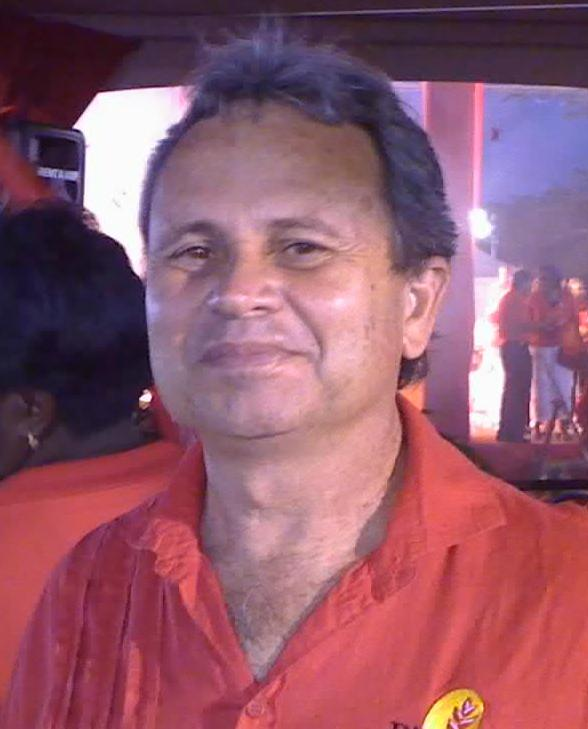

Minister of Public Utilities
- In office 17 March 2025 – 1 May 2025
- Prime Minister: Stuart Young
- Preceded by: Marvin Gonzales
- Succeeded by: Barry Padarath

Member of Parliament for Diego Martin North/East
- Incumbent
- Assumed office 17 December 1991
- Preceded by: Anthony Smart

Personal details
- Party: People's National Movement (PNM)
- Education: University of the West Indies
- Occupation: Civil Engineering

Colm Imbert is a politician in Trinidad and Tobago. He was the Minister of Public Utilities from March until May 2025 and Member of Parliament for the constituency of Diego Martin North/East, which he has represented since December 1991.

During his lengthy parliamentary career, Imbert has served in numerous government positions. He was previously Minister of Finance (2015–2025), Minister of Health (2001–2003), Minister of Science, Technology and Tertiary Education (2003–2005), Minister of Works and Transport (1991–1995 and 2005–2010), Minister of Local Government (1993–1995), Chairman of the Public Accounts Committee of the Parliament of Trinidad and Tobago 2010–2015) as well as Leader of Government Business in the House of Representatives (2007–2010).

He also acted as Prime minister on most occasions when required under Prime Minister Keith Rowley, and recently act as Prime Minister for PM Stuart Young.

== Electoral history ==
2025 Trinidad and Tobago general election: Diego Martin North/East
Party	Candidate	Votes	%	±%
PNM	Colm Imbert	7,064	56.0%	▼17.92
PEP	Brendon Butts	3,525	28.0%	▲24.85
PF	Chelsie Cedeno	708	5.6%	Steady
NTA	Salim George	565	4.5%	Steady
MND	Garvin Nicholas	556	4.4%	▲2.89
All People's Party (Trinidad and Tobago)	Christine Soden	145	1.2%	Steady
Majority		3,539	28.0%	▼25.47
Turnout		12,612	42.22%	
Registered electors		29,869		
PNM hold				

== See also ==
- 12th Republican Parliament of Trinidad and Tobago
- 13th Republican Parliament of Trinidad and Tobago
- People's National Movement
