= Carolyn Seepersad-Bachan =

Trinidad and Tobago politician

The Honourable Carolyn Seepersad-Bachan
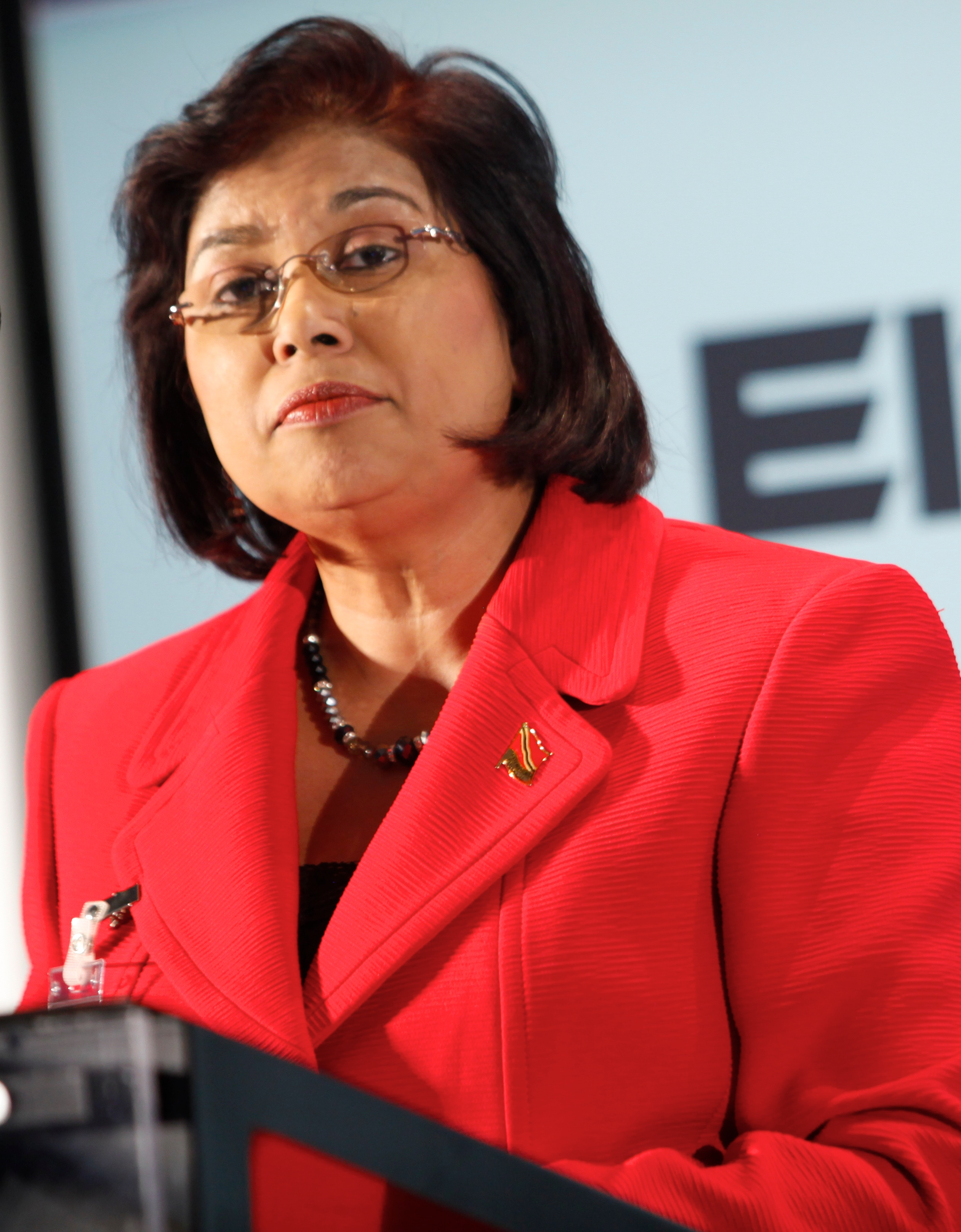

Leader of the Congress of the People
- In office 19 November 2017 – 11 August 2020
- Preceded by: Prakash Ramadhar
- Succeeded by: Kirt Sinnette

Member of Parliament for San Fernando West
- In office 24 May 2010 – 7 September 2015
- Prime Minister: Kamla Persad-Bissessar
- Preceded by: Junia Regrello
- Succeeded by: Faris Al-Rawi

Carolyn Seepersad-Bachan is a Trinidad and Tobago politician and former leader of the Congress of the People. She was a Member of Parliament in the House of Representatives for San Fernando West from 2010 until 2015.

== Early life ==
Her mother is Irma Seepersad and her sister is Suzanne Seepersad. She holds both a bachelor's and master's degree in engineering. In 1996, she was appointed as chairman of the National Petroleum Marketing Company. She was a lecturer in engineering at the University of the West Indies for over twenty years. She also served as a member of the UWI Board of Engineering Institute.

== Political career ==
Seepersad-Bachan was appointed as an Opposition Senator in the Senate from 17 October 2002 to 29 June 2006 as a representative of the United National Congress. She was one of the founding members of the Congress of the People in September 2006 and was appointed a deputy political leader.

She was elected to the House of Representatives as the member for the electoral district of San Fernando West on 24 May 2010. She was affiliated with the Congress of the People, which was a member of the People's Partnership at the time. She was appointed Minister of Energy and Energy Affairs on 28 May 2010, becoming the first female energy minister in Trinidad and Tobago. She held this position until 27 June 2011 when she was appointed Minister of Public Administration. She chose not to run for re-election in the 2015 general election due to differences in opinion with the People's Partnership leader, Kamla Persad-Bissessar, and the Congress of the People leader, Prakash Ramadhar.

On 19 November 2017, Seepersad-Bachan won the leadership elections for the Congress of the People, beating Sharon Ann Gopaul-McNicol, and took over as party leader. She contested the electoral district of St. Augustine in the 2020 general election but lost to Khadijah Ameen. She resigned as party leader of the Congress of the People on 11 August 2020.

== Legal career ==
Seepersad-Bachan received her LLB from the University of London and completed the legal practice course at Staffordshire University. She then completed six months of legal training, including participating in the first judge-only trial in San Fernando. She was called to the bar at the Hall of Justice in Port Spain on 10 May 2019.

== Personal life ==
Seepersad-Bachan is married to Suresh Bachan and has two children: Suren and Saskia.

Political offices
Preceded by Prakash Ramadhar	Leader of the Congress of the People; 2017–2020	Succeeded by Kirt Sinnette
Preceded by Junia Regrello	Member of Parliament for San Fernando West; 2010–2015	Succeeded by Faris Al-Rawi
Preceded by Rudrawatee Nan Gosine-Ramgoolam	Minister of Public Administration; 2011–2015	Succeeded by Randall Mitchell
Preceded by Conrad Enill	Minister of Energy and Energy Affairs; 2010–2011	Succeeded by Kevin Ramnarine
