= Tableland, Trinidad and Tobago =

Village in Trinidad and Tobago

Tableland
- Village
- Interactive map of Tableland
- Coordinates: 10°16′40.08″N 61°15′27″W
- Country: Trinidad and Tobago
- County: Victoria
- Region: Princes Town

Population (2011)
  - Total: 620

Tableland is a village in Trinidad and Tobago, located in the Princes Town region. It is home to the second oldest Hindu temple in the western hemisphere as well as a pineapple industry.

== History ==
Tableland is located on the Naparima-Mayaro Road between Princes Town and Rio Claro. It is part of the Moruga/Tableland constituency for elections to the Parliament of Trinidad and Tobago.

Moose Bhagat Mandir, constructed in 1904, is the oldest Hindu temple in Trinidad and the second oldest in the Western Hemisphere. It was founded by Moose Bhagat, who came from Rajasthan as an indentured laborer and later owned a plot of land. According to legend, Bhagat found a stone in the stream near his home, drawing blood from it after hitting it with his machete. After seeing the god Shiva in a vision, he decided to build the temple to house the stone. It contains shrines to the gods Shiva and Rama as well as historical murals. Bhagat's descendants still care for the temple.

In 2017, a pineapple farm in Tableland was featured on an episode of Sesame Street.

== Agriculture and ecology ==
Historically, many farmers grew cocoa, coffee, or sugarcane. The land in Tableland is particularly well-suited for growing cocoa. However, many farmers have switched from cocoa to pineapples due to its higher profit margin. As of 1994, approximately 60 hectares were devoted to pineapples in Trinidad. By 2000, 250 hectares produced pineapples in Tableland alone. The number of hectares in Tableland under pineapple cultivation was similar in 2011. As of 2023, Tableland hosts many of the pineapple farms in Victoria County. Many farmers are members of the Tableland Pineapple Farmers Association. Commonly, farmers grow the "Tableland hybrid", a cross between Smooth Cayenne and Black Antigua.

As part of the rapid increase in pineapple production in the area, farmers have engaged in practices such as bulldozing cocoa fields and cultivating pineapple on steep slopes. This has led to issues with soil erosion, sustainability, and poor fruit quality. Efforts have been taken to educate farmers about fertilization and soil conservation. The area experiences landslides during rainy season, leading to damaged roads and property. There are also frequent issues with water supply due to aging infrastructure and lack of funding for repair.

== Notable people ==
- Sybil Atteck (1911—1975): artist
- Andil Gosine (1973—): artist, scholar, curator
- Rabindranath Maharaj (1955—): author
- Lionel Frank Seukeran (1908—1992): politician and businessman

== See also ==
- List of cities and towns in Trinidad and Tobago
