= Kevin Ramnarine =

Kevin Ramnarine is a former Minister of Energy and Energy Affairs of Trinidad and Tobago and served in that role June 2011 to September 2015. From May 2010 to June 2011, he served as Parliamentary Secretary in the Ministry of Energy and Energy Affairs of Trinidad and Tobago.

During his tenure as Minister, the government provided the incentives necessary to Trinidad and Tobago’s deepwater acreage for exploration. In total nine deepwater “production sharing contracts” (PSC’s) were signed with BHP Billiton and its partners. Arising out of these nine contracts BHP Billiton conducted the second largest 3D seismic survey conducted by an International Oil Company in the history of the oil industry. This seismic survey covered 20, 1999 square kilometers of the deepwater province of Trinidad and Tobago. The largest being conducted by Anadarko in Colombia.

After government legislated fiscal incentives were implemented, investments in deep-offshore by companies such as BHP meant that Trinidad and Tobago saw a four-fold increase in petroleum related Foreign Direct Investment from $US 501 million in 2010 to $US 1.9 billion in 2014.

In September 2015 the first energy related initial public offering (IPO) in the history of Trinidad and Tobago, The TTNGL (Phoenix Park) IPO went on to become the largest IPO in the history of the Trinidad and Tobago Stock Exchange, following up with an Additional Public Offering (APO) in June 2017.

Due to the rapid expansion of the oil and gas industry, Ramnarine received the award of “Energy Executive of the Year” from Petroleum Economist magazine in 2014.
