= Garvin Nicholas =

Trinidad and Tobago diplomat and politician

Attorney General of Trinidad and Tobago
- In office 3 February 2015 – 17 June 2015
- Prime Minister: Kamla Persad-Bissessar
- Preceded by: Anand Ramlogan
- Succeeded by: Faris Al-Rawi

Personal details
- Party: Movement for National Development
- Other political affiliations: United National Congress (until 2019)
- Education: Oxford Brookes University; Inns of Court School of Law; City, University of London

Garvin Edward Timothy Nicholas (born 1967) is a Trinidad and Tobago politician and former diplomat. He served as a temporary Opposition Senator representing the United National Congress (UNC) in the 8th Republican Parliament and the 10th Republican Parliament. He was the Trinidad and Tobago High Commissioner to the United Kingdom from 2010 until 2013 and the Ambassador Extraordinary and Plenipotentiary for Trinidad and Tobago to Denmark, Finland, Norway, Sweden and Germany. He served as the Attorney General for Trinidad and Tobago from 3 February 2015 until 17 June 2015. He is the leader of the Movement for National Development (MND), a political party which contested the 2020 general election.

== Early life ==
Nicholas was born in Maraval in 1967. He attended Trinity College, Moka, and received a bachelor of laws degree from Oxford Brookes University in the United Kingdom, a post-graduate diploma in professional legal studies from the Inns of Court School of Law, and a masters of law in maritime law from the City, University of London. He was called to the bar in England and Wales in July 2001 as a member of the Inner Temple and was admitted to practice in Trinidad and Tobago in June 2002. He worked as an attorney, including as a door tenant with 3PB Chambers in London.

== Political career ==
Nicholas first became involved in politics when he was appointed to the Advisory Council in Local Government in 1991. He was elected to the first local council for the Diego Martin Regional Corporation the following year, where he served as the councillor for Moka/Boissiere #2 until deciding not to run for re-election in 1996. He was first appointed as a temporary Opposition Senator on 26 November 2002 as a member of the 8th Republican Parliament, a position that he held until 6 May 2003. He served as leader of the Movement for National Development (MND) from 2007 to 2010 and as counsel to the Leader of the Opposition. In the 2010 general election, he ran for a position as a member of parliament in the House of Representatives for the constituency of Diego Martin North/East, on behalf of the United National Congress (UNC). He received 8,076 votes and was within 400 votes of winning, although he lost to the People National Movement (PNM)'s Colm Imbert. He worked as the press secretary for Prime Minister Kamla Persad-Bissessar from June to November of the same year. He worked for the construction of Paramin R.C.

=== Diplomatic career ===
Nicholas served as the Trinidad and Tobago High Commissioner to the United Kingdom from 5 December 2010 until 2013. He was also the Ambassador Extraordinary and Plenipotentiary for Trinidad and Tobago to Denmark, Finland, Norway and Sweden. He presented his letters of credence to the King of Sweden on 28 March 2012. He conducted official trips to Finland, Norway and Denmark. He also served as the ambassador to Germany. He assisted on negotiation of a visa waiver for citizens of Trinidad and Tobago who were travelling to the Schengen Area, with a team headed by the Minister for Foreign Affairs. In 2012, he became the only Trinidad and Tobago High Commissioner to win the Ambassador of the Year Award from the Americas.

He was a member of the board of governors for the Commonwealth Secretariat and the Commonwealth Foundation. He was chairman of the grants committee and the sub-committee of the CARICOM High Commissions for trade and development. He was a member of the Commonwealth Education Trust, the Commonwealth advisory panel for the Queen Elizabeth Diamond Jubilee Trust and a member of the sub-committee to rationalise the strategic plan for the Commonwealth Secretariat. In this last position, he assisted with development of the new commonwealth charter.

=== Return to Trinidad and Tobago ===
He returned to Trinidad and Tobago in April 2014, where he served as the UNC's caretaker for the constituency of St. Joseph. On 6 November 2014, he was appointed to be the caretaker for UNC of the constituency of Diego Martin North/East. He was re-appointed to the position of temporary Opposition Senator during the 10th Republican Parliament, serving from 26 August 2014 to 27 August 2014. Following the resignation of Anand Ramlogan, he was appointed as the Attorney General on 3 February 2015 for the People's Partnership administration. He was appointed to the parliamentary subcommittee on campaign finance reform. He served as the Attorney General until 17 June 2015.

Nicholas re-launched the MND in 2019, although it had been founded fifteen years prior. It contested the 2019 local elections but only received a combined 404 votes. In the 2020 general election, he contested the Diego Martin Central constituency as the candidate for the MND, whereas Dexter Nicholls contested Diego Martin West and Myron Bruce contested Diego Martin North/East. The party promised to focus on food security, procuring government products from small and medium-sized enterprises and diversifying tourism.

Nicholas was the MND candidate for the Diego Martin North/East seat in the 2025 general election.

== Personal life ==
Nicholas is married to Dr Nicola Alcalá and they have one son.

== Electoral history ==
2025 Trinidad and Tobago general election: Diego Martin North/East
| Party | Candidate | Votes | % | ±% |
|---|---|---|---|---|
| PNM | Colm Imbert | 7,064 | 56.0% | ▼17.92 |
| PEP | Brendon Butts | 3,525 | 28.0% | ▲24.85 |
| PF | Chelsie Cedeno | 708 | 5.6% | Steady |
| NTA | Salim George | 565 | 4.5% | Steady |
| MND | Garvin Nicholas | 556 | 4.4% | ▲2.89 |
| All People's Party (Trinidad and Tobago) | Christine Soden | 145 | 1.2% | Steady |
| Majority | | 3,539 | 28.0% | ▼25.47 |
| Turnout | | 12,612 | 42.22% | |
| Registered electors | | 29,869 | | |
| PNM hold | | | | |
