= Democratic National Alliance (Trinidad and Tobago) =

Political party and organisation of Trinidad and Tobago

The Democratic National Alliance (DNA) was a short-lived political party in Trinidad and Tobago. It was introduced on Wednesday, 7 June 2006, after its first meeting at the Crowne Plaza, Port of Spain. DNA arose out of the unification of the Democratic National Assembly, the National Alliance for Reconstruction (NAR), the Democratic Party of Trinidad and Tobago (DPTT) and the Grassroots Foundation, and was under the interim leadership of former United National Congress politician Gerald Yetming, with Steve Alvarez (leader of the DPTT) as Deputy Chairman, Hugh Wooding Thomas as Secretary, Afra Raymond, NAR political leader Carson Charles as policy officer and Hilda Goodial as elections officer.

Yetming described the party as embodying the principles and aspirations of UNC political leader Winston Dookeran.

The party was to be officially launched in August 2006.

In a statement on Thursday 29 June 2006, the Democratic National Assembly said "it had taken a principled decision that it will no longer be pursuing an alliance with either the National Alliance for Reconstruction (NAR) or Mr. Gerald Yetming or the Democratic Party of Trinidad and Tobago (DPTT)", effectively splitting the coalition of the three entities.

In reply Mr Yetming said he would continue to work with the NAR, DPTT and any other body desirous of joining them. He added that another group would soon be joining his attempt to unite the small parties, and promised an announcement on that by next week. "I am trying to build a third force of all the small political groups, bearing in mind that the UNC can't do that any more," Yetming added.

In July 2006 the National Democratic Party of Micheal Sims joined the alliance and the grouping renamed itself the National Democratic Alliance
