= Dwight Yearwood =

Trinidadian long-distance runner

Dwight Yearwood (born May 3, 1959, in Dibe, Port of Spain) is a long-distance runner from Trinidad and Tobago, who has completed 30 marathons and 33 half marathons in spite of his disability, becoming a symbol of hope to many locals.

Yearwood has represented his country in marathons in New York (1987, 1988, and 1989) and in Barbados (1991, 1995). In 2008, Yearwood received a lifetime achievement award, the Alexander B. Chapman Award from Oliver Chapman, the former Trinidad and Tobago Olympic Committee President watched by President George Maxwell Richards.

Yearwood developed polio shortly after his birth. The disease left him with a permanent physical disability and a speech impediment. He was placed in the care of his grandmother who became his source of strength and who taught him to do his best to be self-reliant as far as possible. Dwight Yearwood's story has been captured in the book, Dwight Yearwood – Polio…He survived and conquered by Anton LaFond.
