= Dibe, Trinidad and Tobago =

Coordinates: 10°41′N 61°32′W

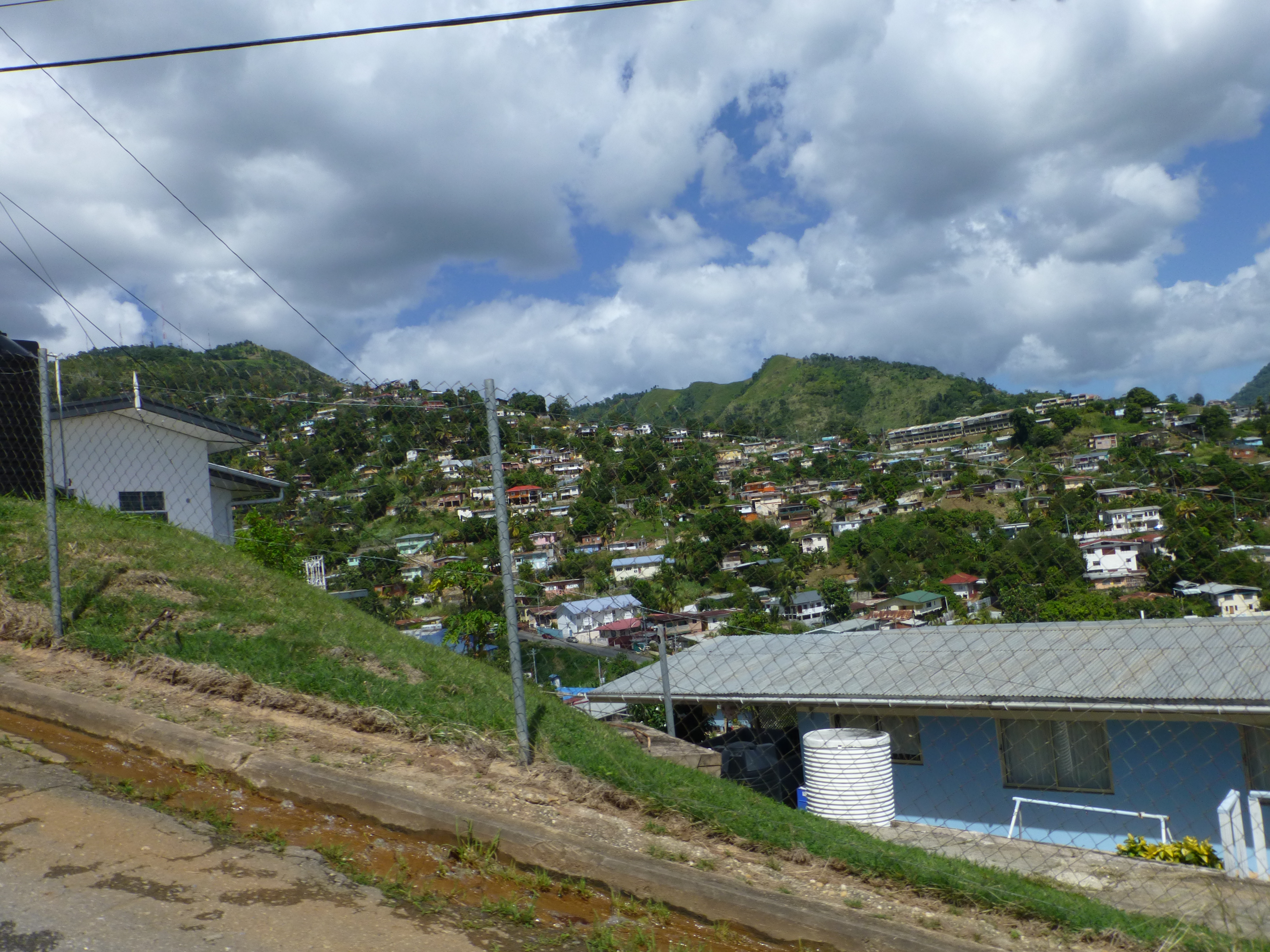
Dibe

Dibe is a village in north Trinidad located northwest of downtown Port of Spain, Trinidad and Tobago. The village is home to the poor and the rich, who respectively live on the surrounding hills and meadows, which has been described as living between a rock and a hard place. Upper Dibe, better known as “Cripple Creek” or ‘’’the Creek”’, has had a dark history with incessant gang warfare for over three decades.

The Dibe area is culturally and racially diverse with a population mix of African Trinidadian (73%), Indian Trinidadian (10%), Mixed (14%), and Chinese/Caucasian/Syrian (2%). The age group of the youth population 7 - 24 represents 35% of the local population. Dibe has a high number of women who have never been married 36% as compared to married couples 23%, or to Common-Law relationships which make up approximately 15%. Most of the households in Dibe are low income households, but there is an upscale housing project, “the Meadows”, with about fifty high income households.

In spite of its continued high risk reputation, the Dibe Community has produced some notable personalities including:

- Frank Porter, the holder of a 2004 National Award of the Public Service Medal of Merit Gold, an author of several books including the Trinidad and Tobago Republic Readers, and a National Director of Youth For Christ Trinidad and Tobago; Joan Porter, a three times National 100 metres Women's Champion and former Trinidad and Tobago Olympic athlete;
- Dwight Yearwood, the well known disabled marathon runner, a member of the Dibe Church of the Nazarene, which is one of two influential community churches that have been working to improve the reputation of Dibe, the other being the People’s United fellowship; Ester Hope-Washington who currently resides in the USA, a three times National 100 metres Women's Champion and former Trinidad and Tobago Olympic athlete;
- Michael Fraser, a Disabled Peoples International Deputy Chairperson for Human Rights and President of DPI Trinidad and Tobago.
