= Seukeran Independent Party =

Former political party in Trinidad and Tobago

The Seukeran Independent Party was a political party in Trinidad and Tobago founded by Lionel Frank Seukeran. It contested the 1966 general elections, but received just 569 votes and failed to win a seat. It did not contest any further elections.
