= Natural Law Party (Trinidad and Tobago) =

The National Law Party was a political party in Trinidad and Tobago. It contested the 1995 general elections, but received just 0.3% of the national vote and failed to win a seat. The party did not contest any further elections.
