= National Solidarity Assembly =

National Solidarity Assembly is a political party in Trinidad and Tobago. It is the political arm of the All Trinidad General Worker's Trade Union. Union President Nirvan Maharaj formed the NSA, and sits as interim political leader, after years of struggle, making representation to past government administrations, for the implementation of a court order for the effective honoring of V.S.E.P. to the former workers of the Caroni (1975) ltd. In frustration, due to their unresponsive and uncooperative stance, and the dire need, for better representation for the people of Trinidad & Tobago, a new political party was born at the Rienzi Complex, Couva. National Solidarity Assembly's majority of membership is the former workers of Caroni (1975) ltd.

The party did not put up any candidates for the 2015 general election.
