= Democratic National Assembly =

Political party in Trinidad and Tobago

The Democratic National Assembly (DNA) is a political party in Trinidad and Tobago. The party is meant to serve as a "third force" is society, providing a "non-tribal" alternative to the ruling United National Congress and the Opposition People's National Movement. The party symbol is a flat topped pyramid.

At present the officers in the party are: Ms Dara Healy- Chairman, Colin Coker- Political Leader Tobago, Hugh Wooding Thomas- Secretary, Stephen Leonce- Strategy and Campaign Director and Anthony Pinto- Special advisor.

The party was launched in March, 2006, founded by political scientist Kirk Meighoo and businessman Anthony Pinto. It was formed after the dissolution of the Committee for Transformation and Progress headed by Meighoo, and incorporated the Civilian Oversight Organisation and other groups.

At first the party was a member of the Democratic National Alliance a coalition of minor parties under the leadership of Gerald Yetming, then Independent, Member of Parliament for St. Joseph. However, in a statement on Thursday 29 June 2006, the Democratic National Assembly said "it had taken a principled decision that it will no longer be pursuing and alliance with either the National Alliance for Reconstruction (NAR) or Mr. Gerald Yetming or the Democratic Party of Trinidad and Tobago (DPTT)", effectively splitting the coalition of the three entities.

On 12 September 2006, two DNA founders, Afra Raymond and Novack George, were expelled from the party.

On 3 October 2006 Meighoo resigned as a UWI lecturer to lead the DNA full-time.

In the 2007 General Elections, the DNA leader Meighoo joined the UNC alliance, and fought the Chaguanas East seat.

In the 5 November 2007 parliamentary elections, the party won 0.01% and no seats.
