= Democratic Party of Trinidad and Tobago =

Political party in Trinidad and Tobago

- Abbreviation: DPTT
- Leader: Steve Alvarez
- Chairperson: Wayne Rodriguez
- Founded: 2001
- Ideology: Progressivism
- Slogan: The way forward for Trinidad and Tobago.

The Democratic Party of Trinidad and Tobago (DPTT) is a political party formed in 2001 in Trinidad and Tobago. It does not have parliamentary representation.

The party is led by Steve Alvarez, with Wayne Rodriguez as its chairman. The party symbol for the DPTT is the hummingbird feeding on a hibiscus flower. The motto of the party is "The way forward for Trinidad and Tobago."

== History ==
The Democratic Party of Trinidad and Tobago was founded six months before the 2002 Trinidad and Tobago general election. Ten party candidates were running for parliamentary seats and all of them lost in the election.

On March 9, 2006, the party officially launched the start of its campaign for the elections constitutionally due in 2007.

On July 9, 2007, the United National Congress announced it entered the elections as an alliance force with the smaller political parties including the DPTT.

The Democratic Party of Trinidad and Tobago is pledged to the good governance of Trinidad & Tobago, the rule of law, liberty for all human beings, human rights, equality of all races, human dignity, and to uplifting the standard of living for all. The Party constantly shares its vision for improving the lives of the citizens of Trinidad & Tobago through the writings of its leader Steve Alvarez.

== Objectives ==
The DPTT pledges itself to the following objectives:

- The maintenance of national independence and the promotion of the national symbols and institutions including, the national flag, national anthem, national songs, national pledge, the republican government, and the state institutions of Trinidad and Tobago.
- The maintenance of democracy
- Continued improvement in the standard of living for all
- Safe and secure neighborhoods
- Safe operations of industries
- Respect for democratic trade unionism
- Equal rights and opportunity for all
- The elimination of all forms of discrimination
- Economic development
- Co-operation with the regional and international community
