= National Transformation Party (Trinidad and Tobago) =

Political party in Trinidad and Tobago

The National Transformation Party was a political party in Trinidad and Tobago. It contested the 1995 general elections, but received just 83 votes and failed to win a seat. The party did not contest any further elections.
