= 1995 Trinidad and Tobago general election =

- 6 November 1995

All 36 seats in the House of Representatives 19 seats needed for a majority
- Turnout: 63.30% (▼2.16pp)
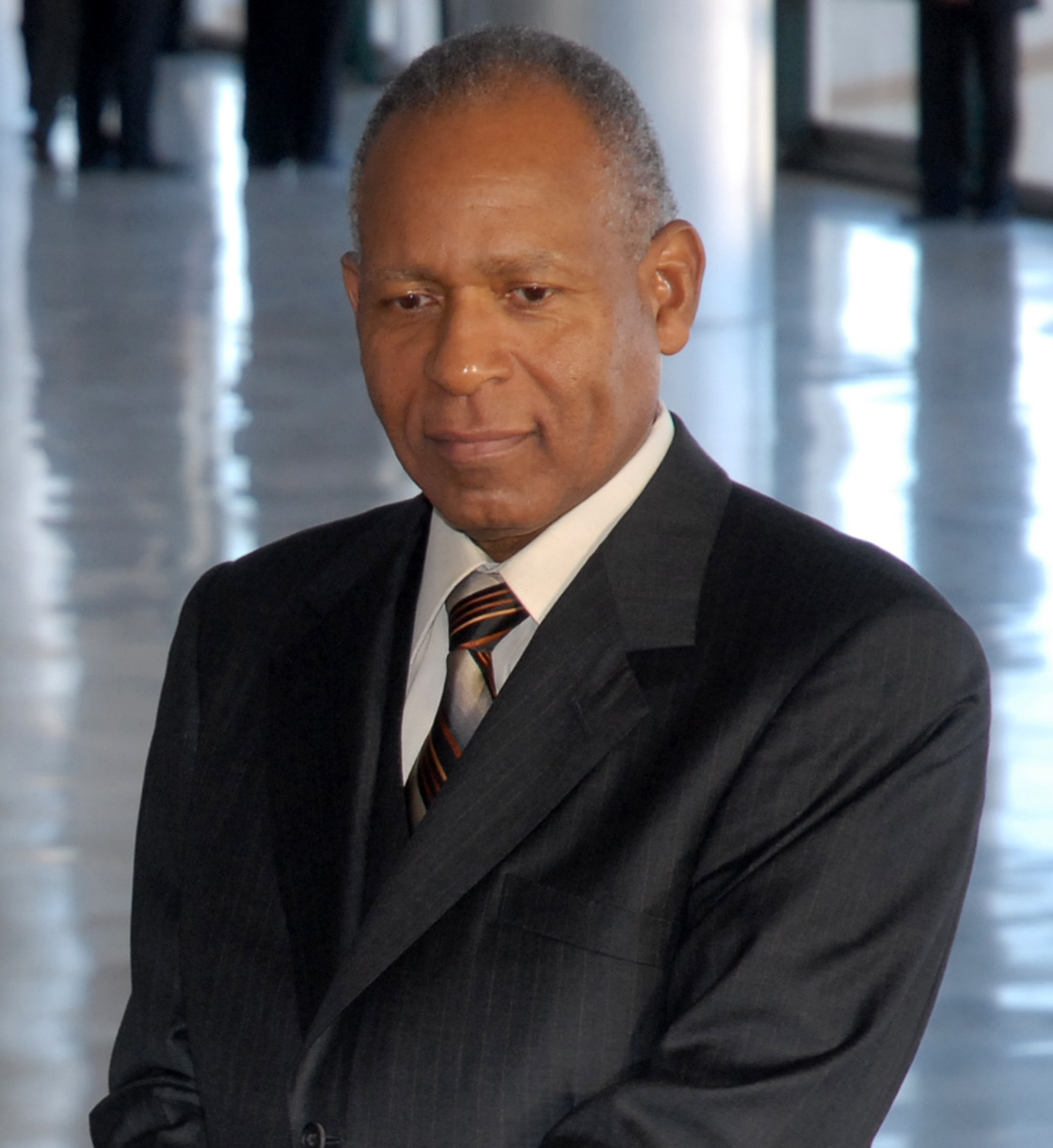

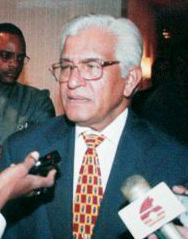

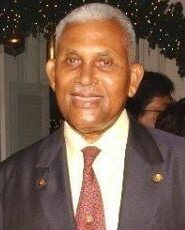
	First party	Second party	Third party
Leader	Patrick Manning	Basdeo Panday	A. N. R. Robinson
Party	PNM	UNC	NAR
Last election	45.07%, 21 seats	29.20%, 13 seats	24.62%, 2 seats
Seats won	17	17	2
Seat change	▼4	▲4	Steady
Popular vote	256,159	240,372	24,983
Percentage	48.76%	45.76%	4.76%
Swing	▲3.69pp	▲16.56pp	▼19.86pp
Prime Minister before election
Patrick Manning
People's National Movement
Subsequent Prime Minister
Basdeo Panday
United National Congress

Early general elections were held in Trinidad and Tobago on 6 November 1995, after the ruling People's National Movement had seen its majority reduced to a single seat due to a defection and a lost by-election. The results saw the PNM and the United National Congress both win 17 seats. Although they had received fewer votes, the UNC was able to form a coalition with the two-seat National Alliance for Reconstruction, allowing UNC leader Basdeo Panday to become the country's first Prime Minister of Indian descent. Voter turnout was 63.3%.

== Results ==
Party	Votes	%	Seats	+/–
People's National Movement	256,159	48.76	17	–4
United National Congress	240,372	45.76	17	+4
National Alliance for Reconstruction	24,983	4.76	2	0
Movement for Unity and Progress	2,123	0.40	0	New
Natural Law Party	1,590	0.30	0	New
National Transformation Party	83	0.02	0	New
People's Voice Party	16	0.00	0	New
Total	525,326	100.00	36	0
Valid votes	525,326	99.06		
Invalid/blank votes	4,985	0.94		
Total votes	530,311	100.00		
Registered voters/turnout	837,741	63.30		
Source: EBCTT, Nohlen
