= 13th Republican Parliament of Trinidad and Tobago =

Parliament of Trinidad and Tobago

←	12th	14th	→

Overview
- Legislative body: Parliament of Trinidad and Tobago
- Jurisdiction: Trinidad and Tobago
- Term: 3 May 2025 – 2030
- Election: 2025 Trinidad and Tobago general election
- Government: UNC (26)
- Opposition: PNM (13); TPP (2)
- Members: 41

The current members of the Parliament of Trinidad and Tobago are listed below based on the results of the 2025 general election:

Following the election new senators were appointed.

== Members ==
The follow are members of the House of Representatives Trinidad and Tobago:

Constituency	Party	Member of Parliament	Years in office	Notes
Aranguez/St Joseph	UNC	Devesh Maharaj	2025–present	
Arima	PNM	Pennelope Beckles-Robinson	2000–2010, 2020–present	
Arouca/Lopinot	PNM	Marvin Gonzales	2020–present	
Barataria/San Juan	UNC	Saddam Hosein	2020–present	
Caroni Central	UNC	David Lee	2015–present	
Caroni East	UNC	Rishad Seecheran	2020–present	
Chaguanas East	UNC	Vandana Mohit	2020–present	
Chaguanas West	UNC	Colin Neil Gosine	2025–present	
Claxton Bay	UNC	Hansen Narinesingh	2025–present	
Couva North	UNC	Jearlean John	2025–present	
Couva South	UNC	Barry Padarath	2015–present	
Cumuto/Manzanilla	UNC	Shivanna Sam	2025–present	
Diego Martin Central	PNM	Symon de Nobriga	2020–present	
Diego Martin North/East	PNM	Colm Imbert	1991–present	
Diego Martin West	PNM	Hans des Vignes	2025–present	
Fyzabad	UNC	Davendranath Tancoo	2020–present	
La Brea	UNC	Clyde Elder	2025–present	
La Horquetta/Talparo	UNC	Phillip Watts	2025–present	
Laventille East/Morvant	PNM	Christian Birchwood	2025–present	
Laventille West	PNM	Kareem Marcelle	2025–present	
Malabar/Mausica	PNM	Dominic Romain	2025–present	
Mayaro	UNC	Nicholas Morris	2025–present	
Moruga/Tableland	UNC	Michelle Benjamin	2020–present	
Naparima	UNC	Narindra Roopnarine	2025–present	
Oropouche East	UNC	Roodal Moonilal	2002–2007, 2010–present	
Oropouche West	UNC	Lackram Bodoe	2015–present	
Point Fortin	UNC	Ernesto Kesar	2025–present	
Port of Spain North/St. Ann's West	PNM	Stuart Young	2015–present	
Port of Spain South	PNM	Keith Scotland	2020–present	
Princes Town	UNC	Aiyna Ali	2025–present	
San Fernando East	PNM	Brian Manning	2020–present	
San Fernando West	UNC	Michael Dowlath	2025–present	
Siparia	UNC	Kamla Persad-Bissessar	1995–present	
St. Ann's East	PNM	Nyan Gadsby-Dolly	2015–present	
St. Augustine	UNC	Khadijah Ameen	2020–present	
Tabaquite	UNC	Sean Sobers	2025–present	
Tobago East	TPP	David Thomas	2025–present	
Tobago West	TPP	Joel Sampson	2025–present	
Toco/Sangre Grande	UNC	Wayne Sturge	2025–present	
Trincity/Maloney	PNM	Camille Robinson-Regis	2015–present	
Tunapuna	UNC	Roger Alexander	2025–present	

== Senate ==
The following are members of the Senate of Trinidad and Tobago:

Member of Parliament	Party	Date appointed as a Senator	Office	Notes
Faris Al-Rawi	PNM	23 May 2025		
Phillip Alexander	UNC	7 May 2025	Minister in the Ministry of Housing	
Darrell Allahar	UNC	22 May 2025	Minister in the Office of the Prime Minister	
Marlene Attzs	Independent	23 May 2025		
Brian Baig	UNC	23 May 2025		
Leroy Baptiste	UNC	3 May 2025	Minister of Labour and Small and Micro Enterprises	
Amery Browne	PNM	23 May 2025		
Natalie Chaitan-Maharaj	UNC	3 May 2025	Parliamentary Secretary at the Ministry of the People, Social Development and Family Services	
Kenya Charles	UNC	23 May 2025	Elected as Vice-President of the Senate on 23 May 2025	
Foster Cummings	PNM	23 May 2025		
Simon de la Bastide	Independent	23 May 2025		
Vishnu Dhanpaul	PNM	23 May 2025		
John Jeremie	UNC	1 May 2025	Attorney General	
Janelle John-Bates	PNM	23 May 2025		
Candice Jones-Simmons	Independent	23 May 2025		
Alicia Lalite-Ettienne	Independent	23 May 2025		
Francis Lewis	Independent	23 May 2025		
Satyakama Maharaj	UNC	7 May 2025	Minister of Trade, Industry and Tourism	
Wade Mark	UNC	23 May 2025	President of the Senate of Trinidad and Tobago	
Courtney McNish	Independent	23 May 2025		
Desirée Murray	Independent	23 May 2025		
David Nakhid	UNC	22 May 2025	Parliamentary Secretary at the Ministry of Sports and Youth Affairs	
Prakash Persad	UNC	3 May 2025	Minister of Tertiary Education and Skills Training	
Ravi Ratiram	UNC	3 May 2025	Minister of Agriculture and Fisheries	
Anil Roberts	UNC	3 May 2025	Minister in the Ministry of Housing	
Melanie Roberts-Radgman	PNM	23 May 2025		
Dominic Smith	UNC	3 May 2025	Minister of Public Administration and Artificial Intelligence	
Kennedy Swaratsingh	UNC	3 May 2025	Minister of Planning, Economic Affairs and Development	
Anthony Viera	Independent	23 May 2025		
Eli Zakour	UNC	3 May 2025	Minister of Transport and Civil Aviation	
