= 11th Republican Parliament of Trinidad and Tobago =

←	10th	12th	→

Overview
- Legislative body: Parliament of Trinidad and Tobago
- Jurisdiction: Trinidad and Tobago
- Term: 19 August 2020 – 18 March 2025
- Election: 2020 Trinidad and Tobago general election
- Government: PNM (23)
- Opposition: UNC (17); COP (1)
- Members: 41

The 11th Republican Parliament of Trinidad and Tobago (2015-2020) was constituted based on the 2015 general elections.

== House of Representatives ==
Constituency		Party	Member of Parliament	Notes
1	Arima	PNM	Anthony Garcia	
2	Arouca/Maloney	PNM	Camille Robinson-Regis	
3	Barataria/San Juan	UNC	Fuad Khan	
4	Caroni Central	UNC	Bhoe Tewarie	
5	Caroni East	UNC	Tim Gopeesingh	
6	Chaguanas East	UNC	Fazal Karim	
7	Chaguanas West	UNC	Ganga Singh	
8	Couva North	UNC	Ramona Ramdial	
9	Couva South	UNC	Rudranath Indarsingh	
10	Cumuto/Manzanilla	UNC	Christine Newallo-Hosein	
11	D'Abadie/O'Meara	PNM	Ancil Antoine	
12	Diego Martin Central	PNM	Darryl Smith	
13	Diego Martin North/East	PNM	Colm Imbert	
14	Diego Martin West	PNM	Keith Rowley	Prime Minister
15	Fyzabad	UNC	Lackram Bodoe	
16	La Brea	PNM	Nicole Olivierre	
17	La Horquetta/Talparo	PNM	Maxie Cuffie	
18	Laventille East/Morvant	PNM	Adrian Leonce	
19	Laventille West	PNM	Fitzgerald Hinds	
20	Lopinot/Bon Air West	PNM	Cherrie Ann Crichlow-Cockburn	
21	Mayaro	UNC	Rushton Paray	
22	Moruga/Tableland	PNM	Lovell Francis	
23	Naparima	UNC	Rodney Charles	
24	Oropouche East	UNC	Roodal Moonilal	
25	Oropouche West	UNC	Vidia Goopiesingh	
26	Point Fortin	PNM	Edmund Dillion	
27	Pointe-à-Pierre	UNC	David Lee	
28	Port of Spain North/St. Ann's West	PNM	Stuart Young	
29	Port of Spain South	PNM	Marlene McDonald	
30	Princes Town	UNC	Barry Padarath	
31	San Fernando East	PNM	Randall Mitchell	
32	San Fernando West	PNM	Faris Al Rawi	
33	Siparia	UNC	Kamla Persad-Bissessar	Leader of the Opposition
34	St. Ann's East	PNM	Nyan Gadsby-Dolly	
35	St. Augustine	COP	Prakash Ramadhar	
36	St. Joseph	PNM	Terrence Deyalsingh	
37	Tabaquite	UNC	Surujrattan Rambachan	
38	Tobago East	PNM	Ayanna Webster-Roy	
39	Tobago West	PNM	Shamfa Cudjoe	
40	Toco/Sangre Grande	PNM	Glenda Jennings-Smith	
41	Tunapuna	PNM	Esmond Forde	
–	–	PNM	Bridgid Annisette-George	Speaker

== Senate ==
Name	Party	Appointed	Demitted	Notes
Government Senators
Hafeez Ali	PNM	23 September 2015	13 June 2016	
Ancil Antoine	PNM	11 September 2015	9 August 2020	
Allyson Baksh	PNM	23 September 2015	27 November 2017	
Jennifer Baptiste-Primus	PNM	11 September 2015	9 August 2020	
Terrence Beepath	PNM	5 Jul 2016	6 Jul 2016	
Sarah Budhu	PNM	23 September 2015	30 Oct 2016	
W. Michael Coppin	PNM	23 September 2015	24 Aug 2017	
Donna Cox	PNM	21 Jul 2019	9 August 2020	
Foster Cummings	PNM	23 September 2015	9 August 2020	
Nigel de Freitas	PNM	23 September 2015	9 August 2020	
Daniel Dookie	PNM	23 September 2015	9 August 2020	
Paula Gopee-Scoon	PNM	11 September 2015	9 August 2020	
Lester Henry	PNM	23 September 2015	9 August 2020	
Kazim Hosein	PNM	31 Oct 2016	9 August 2020	
Ronald Huggins	PNM	28 Nov 2017	27 Sep 2018	
Christine Kangaloo	PNM	23 September 2015	9 August 2020	
Franklin Khan	PNM	11 September 2015	9 August 2020	
Robert Le Hunte	PNM	31 Aug 2017	18 May 2020	
Ayanna Lewis	PNM	14 Feb 2017	29 Jun 2017	
Dennis Moses	PNM	11 September 2015	9 August 2020	
Clarence Rambharat	PNM	11 September 2015	9 August 2020	
Garvin Simonette	PNM	28 Sep 2018	14 Aug 2019	
Rohan Sinanan		14 Jun 2016	9 August 2020	
Avinash Singh		11 September 2015	9 August 2020	
Temporary senators
Harvey Borris	PNM	16 Apr 2019	15 Jun 2020	
Ronald Huggins	PNM	3 May 2016	26 Oct 2017	
Ayanna Lewis	PNM	5 Jul 2016	24 Jan 2017	
Ayanna Lewis	PNM	5 Dec 2017	5 Jul 2018	
Imran Mohammed		14 Jun 2016	27 Jun 2017	
Taharqa Obika	PNM	26 Nov 2024	26 Nov 2024	
Alisha Romano	PNM	24 Nov 2015	7 Jun 2018	
Garvin Simonette	PNM	15 May 2018	14 Sep 2018	
Rohan Sinanan	PNM	24 Nov 2015	8 Jun 2016	
	PNM			
Opposition Senators
Khadijah Ameen	UNC	23 September 2015	9 August 2020	
Vasant Bharath	UNC	23 September 2015	11 Nov 2015	
Anita Haynes-Alleyne	UNC	29 Sep 2017	9 August 2020	
Saddam Hosein	UNC	29 Sep 2017	9 August 2020	
Ashvani Mahabir	UNC	15 May 2019	11 Jun 2019	
Wade Mark	UNC	23 September 2015	9 August 2020	
Gerald Ramdeen	UNC	20 Oct 2016	6 May 2019	
Rodger Samuel	COP	23 September 2015	28 Sep 2017	
Sean Sobers		12 Jun 2019	9 August 2020	
Daniel Solomon		23 September 2015	28 Sep 2017	
Temporary senators
Sharla Alexander-Dolabaille	UNC	14 Sep 2017	19 Sep 2017	
Robert Amar	UNC	22 June 2020	22 June 2020	
Brian Baig	UNC	12 December 2017	30 April 2019	
Karunaa Bisramsingh	UNC	2 Apr 2019	3 Apr 2019	
Raphael Cumberbatch	UNC	17 Jan 2017	14 Feb 2017	
Racquel Ghany	UNC	14 Feb 2017	29 Nov 2017	
Gerald Hadeed	UNC	8 Dec 2015	19 Oct 2016	
Gerald Hadeed	UNC	19 Dec 2016	20 Dec 2016	
Jearlean John	UNC	15 May 2018	15 May 2018	
Jabez Johnson	UNC	26 Oct 2017	27 Oct 2017	
Larry Lalla	UNC	12 May 2020	13 May 2020	
Damian Lyder	UNC	19 May 2020	20 May 2020	
Waffie Mohammed	UNC	11 Jan 2017	12 Jan 2017	
Christlyn Moore	Tobago Forwards	25 April 2017	25 May 2017	
Wayne Munro	UNC	8 Dec 2015	20 Dec 2016	
Jwala Rambarran	UNC	26 Oct 2017	27 Oct 2017	
Gerald Ramdeen	UNC	3 May 2016	24 Sep 2016	
Bhadase Seetahal-Maharaj	UNC	11 Jan 2017	12 Jan 2017	
Hasine Shaikh	UNC	21 Jun 2018	6 Jun 2019	
Sean Sobers		14 Mar 2017	6 Jun 2019	
Independent Senators
Sophia Chote	Independent	23 September 2015	9 August 2020	
Stephen Creese	Independent	23 September 2015	19 Nov 2018	
Amrita Deonarine	Independent	20 Nov 2018	9 August 2020	
Varma Deyalsingh	Independent	19 Oct 2018	9 August 2020	
Maria Dillon-Remy	Independent	20 Nov 2018	9 August 2020	
Clive Dottin	Independent	7 Jun 2016	14 Sep 2018	
Josh Drayton	Independent	18 Dec 2018	21 May 2020	
Dhanayshar Mahabir	Independent	23 September 2015	27 Sep 2018	
Jennifer Raffoul	Independent	23 September 2015	19 Nov 2018	
Melissa Ramkissoon	Independent	23 September 2015	19 Nov 2018	
Paul Richards	Independent	23 September 2015	9 August 2020	
H.R. Ian Roach	Independent	23 September 2015	19 November 2018	
Charrise Seepersad	Independent	20 November 2018	9 August 2020	
Taurel Shrikissoon		23 September 2015	19 November 2018	
David Small		23 September 2015	19 November 2018	
Temporary senators
Stacy Cummings	Independent	20 Feb 2018	13 Mar 2018	
Ronald Duke	Independent	15 May 2018	13 Sep 2018	
Aysha Edwards	Independent	20 Oct 2015	21 Oct 2015	
Nikoli Edwards	Independent	11 Jan 2017	6 Jul 2017	
John Heath	Independent	14 Mar 2017	17 Jun 2019	
Shervon Ifill	Independent	14 Sep 2018	17 Mar 2020	
Wayne Inniss	Independent	5 Jul 2016	4 Dec 2019	
Justin Junkere	Independent	20 Oct 2015	11 May 2016	
Folade Mutota	Independent	21 May 2019	2 Jul 2019	
Zola Phillips	Independent	21 Jun 2018	21 May 2020	
Elton Prescott	Independent	4 Apr 2018	6 Jun 2019	
Kriyaan Singh	Independent	24 May 2016	25 May 2016	
	Independent			
	Independent			
	Independent			
	Independent			
