= Persad-Bissessar administration =

Government of Trinidad and Tobago under Kamla Persad-Bissessar

Kamla Persad-Bissessar is the Prime Minister of Trinidad and Tobago and is the head of a United National Congress/Coalition of Interests-led government.

The UNC and its allies obtained a majority of the seats contested in the 2025 Trinidad and Tobago general election, defeating the People's National Movement and forming the government. Persad-Bissessar and Attorney General John Jeremie were sworn in on May 1, 2025, with the remainder of the Cabinet being sworn in on May 3.

== Cabinet ==
Portfolio	Minister
Prime Minister	Kamla Persad-Bissessar
Attorney General	John Jeremie
Minister of Finance	Davendranath Tancoo
Minister of Energy and Energy Industries	Roodal Moonilal
Minister of Defence	Wayne Sturge
Minister of Homeland Security	Roger Alexander
Minister of Justice	Devesh Maharaj
Minister in the Office of the Attorney General	Devesh Maharaj
Minister of Land and Legal Affairs	Saddam Hosein
Minister in the Ministry of Agriculture and Fisheries	Saddam Hosein
Minister of Foreign and Caricom Affairs	Sean Sobers
Minister of the People, Social Development and Family Services	Vandana Mohit
Minister of Planning, Economic Affairs and Development	Kennedy Swaratsingh
Minister of Culture and Community Development	Michelle Benjamin
Minister of Rural Development and Local Government	Khadijah Ameen
Minister of Agriculture and Fisheries	Ravi Ratiram
Minister of Housing	David Lee
Minister of Transport and Civil Aviation	Eli Zakour
Minister of Works and Infrastructure	Jearlean John
Minister of Public Utilities	Barry Padarath
Minister in the Office of the Prime Minister	Barry Padarath
Minister in the Office of the Prime Minister	Darrell Allahar
Minister of Public Administration and Artificial Intelligence	Dominic Smith
Minister of Health	Lackram Bodoe
Minister of Education	Michael Dowlath
Minister of Tertiary Education and Skills Training	Prakash Persad
Minister of Labour and Small and Micro Enterprises	Leroy Baptiste
Minister of Sports and Youth Affairs	Phillip Watts
Minister of Trade, Investment, and Tourism	Kama Maharaj

== Junior Ministers ==
Portfolio	Minister
Minister in the Ministry of Housing	Phillip Alexander
Minister in the Ministry of Energy and Energy Industries	Ernesto Kesar
Minister in the Ministry of Health	Rishad Seecheran
Minister in the Ministry of Housing	Anil Roberts
Minister in the Ministry of Public Utilities	Clyde Elder

== Parliamentary Secretaries ==
Ministry	Parliamentary Secretary
Ministry of Culture and Community Development	Narindra Roopnarine
Ministry of Foreign and Caricom Affairs	Nicholas Morris
Office of the Prime Minister	Nicholas Morris
Ministry of the People, Social Development and Family Services	Natalie Chaitan-Maharaj
Ministry of Public Utilities	Shivanna Sam
Ministry of Sports and Youth Affairs	David Nakhid
Ministry of Tertiary Education and Skills Training	Hansen Narinesingh
