= De la Bastide =

De la Bastide is a surname of French origin. It means in English "From the Bastide".

== People with the surname ==
- Charles Joubert de La Bastide, French naval officer
- Henri de La Bastide (1916–1986), French writer and scholar
- Michael de la Bastide (1937–2024), Trinidad and Tobago lawyer
- Miguel de la Bastide, Trinidad-born Flamenco composer and virtuoso guitarist
- Simon de la Bastide, Trinidad and Tobago lawyer and politician
- Tyrone de la Bastide (1938–2008), Trinidad and Tobago footballer

== See also ==
- De la Bastie
- Jardin botanique de la Bastide
- La Bastide-de-Sérou
- La Bastide-des-Jourdans
