= Seepersad =

Seepersad is an Indo-Trinidadian and Tobagonian name. It may refer to:

- Seepersad Naipaul (1906–1953), Trinidadian writer
- Carolyn Seepersad, American mechanical engineer
- Carolyn Seepersad-Bachan, Trinidad and Tobago politician
- Charrise Seepersad, Trinidad and Tobago politician

== See also ==
- Persaud, a related surname
