= Hacksaw (disambiguation) =

A hacksaw is a fine-tooth saw used for cutting materials such as metal or plastics.

Hacksaw may also refer to:

== People ==
- Mary Cain (editor) (1904–1984), American newspaper editor, political activist, and gubernatorial candidate nicknamed "Hacksaw Mary"
- Lee Hamilton (sports), American sportscaster nicknamed "Hacksaw"
- Jack Reynolds (American football) (born 1947), American National Football League player nicknamed "Hacksaw"
- Sam Tuitupou (born 1982), New Zealand rugby union player nicknamed "Hacksaw"
- Jim Duggan (born 1954), American professional wrestler known by the ring name "Hacksaw"
- Butch Reed (born 1954), American professional wrestler also known as "Hacksaw"

== Other uses ==
- Hacksaw (1971 film), an American television Western
- Hacksaw (2020 film), a found footage horror film

== See also ==
- Hackshaw (surname)
