= Deonarine =

Deonarine is a given name and a surname. Notable people with the name include:

== Given name ==
- Deonarine Deyal (born 1963), Trinidadian cricketer

== Surname ==
- Amrita Deonarine, Trinidadian politician
- Krishna Deonarine (1905–1972), Trinidadian trade unionist
- Narsingh Deonarine (born 1983), Guyanese cricketer
