= Sacha Cosmetics =

Sacha Cosmetics Ltd.
- Company type: Private
- Founded: 1979
- Founder: Satyakama "Kama" Maharaj
- Headquarters: 1-3 Eagles Crescent, Freeport, Trinidad and Tobago
- Website: www.sachacosmetics.com

Sacha Cosmetics a Trinidad and Tobago-based cosmetics manufacturer. Founded in 1979, Sacha cosmetics is distributed in 23 countries. It is one of the oldest brand made for people of color and by people of color.

== History ==
Sacha Cosmetics was created by Kama Maharaj in 1979.

Sacha Cosmetics was the official cosmetics brand of the Miss Universe 1999 pageant, the Miss USA 2000 and 2001, the Miss Bahamas 2011 pageant and the Miss Panama 2014 pageants.

In 2018, Sasha Cosmetics opened a store in Panama and became the sole provider of Tiendas TRD Caribe (+2000 stores in Latin America) in Cuba. In 2023, the company launched a franchise program.

== Activities ==
Sasha Cosmetics distributes four brands: Sacha, Arista, Rouane and Nature's Secret.

== See also ==
- Johnson Products Company
