= Elmina Clarke-Allen Highway =

The Elmina Clarke-Allen Highway is a highway in Trinidad and Tobago. The highway links the towns of Cumuto and Sangre Grande. It is named in honour of Elmina Clarke-Allen, a former Minister in the Ministry of Housing and Toco/Manzanilla MP from 1981 to 1986.

== Development ==
=== History ===
The highway was opened on April 24, 2025, by then Prime Minister Stuart Young and then Minister of Works and Transport Rohan Sinanan.

The highway marked the completion of phase 1 of the Churchill Roosevelt Highway Extension to Manzanilla project and was completed at a cost of TT$500 million.

=== Features ===
The highway consists of two distinct sections: a 5 km (3.11 mi) four-lane highway and a 1.9 km (1.18 mi) two-lane connector road.

=== Erosion ===
Days after the opening, sections of the highway experienced erosion which led to slippage.

Minister of Works and Infrastructure Jearlean John visited the highway on May 28, 2025, and assessed the situation.

John explained that construction is continuing; however, recent heavy rainfall and saturated soil have caused some slippage in the area.As of May 29, 2025, contractors have indicated that the situation has since stabalised.

A rubberised material has been applied to the affected area to prevent further erosion while construction continues and a temporary concrete beam has been installed. Slope reconstruction scheduled to begin and final grading is expected to be completed by May 31.

== Notes ==
Jearlean John became Minister of Works and Infrastructure after the 2025 Trinidad and Tobago general election, the Ministry of Works and Transport was renamed and restructured to the Ministry of Works and Infrastructure.
