= Eulalie James =

Trinidad and Tobago politician

The Honourable Eulalie James

Member of the House of Representatives for Laventille West
- In office 1994–2007
- Preceded by: Morris Marshall
- Succeeded by: NiLeung Hypolite

Personal details
- Born: 1940s
- Died: 19 October 2011 (aged 71)
- Party: People's National Movement

Eulalie James (1940 – 19 October 2011) was a Trinidad and Tobago politician. She served in the Parliament of Trinidad and Tobago. She was first elected in a by-election in 1995.

In 2005, while serving as minister in the Ministry of Community Development, Culture and Gender Affairs in the Manning Administration, James was flown to Cuba where she underwent emergency surgery in which her leg was amputated.

== See also ==
- List of Trinidad and Tobago Members of Parliament
