= Raffoul =

Raffoul is a surname. Notable people with the surname include:

- Billy Raffoul, Canadian rock singer-songwriter
- François Raffoul (born 1960), American philosopher
- Isaac Saba Raffoul (1923–2008), Mexican businessman
- Jennifer Raffoul (born 1984), Trinidad and Tobago businesswoman and politician

== See also ==
- Rafford
