= Folade Mutota =

Trinidadian politician and activist

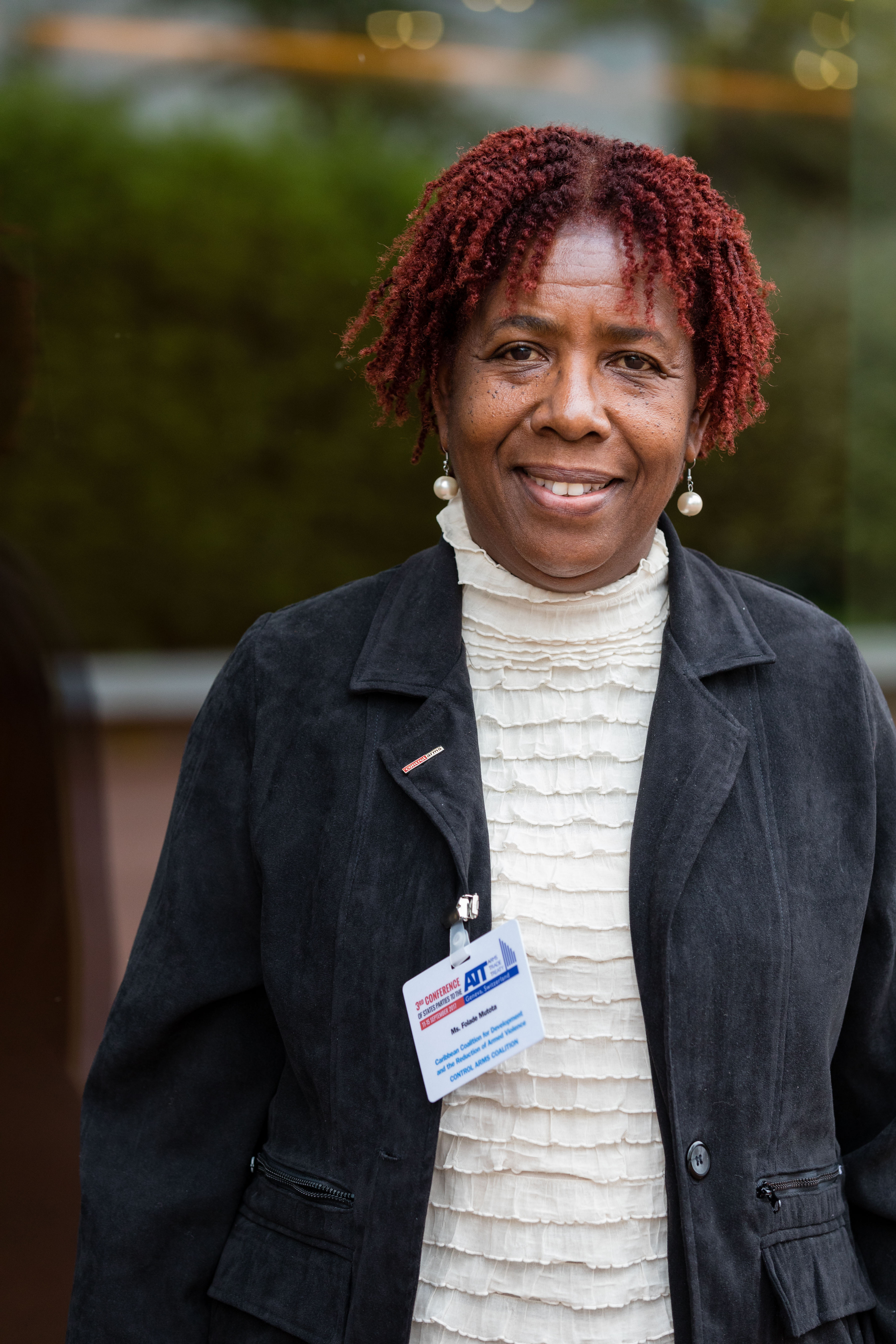
- Mutota in 2017
- Occupations: Politician, arms control expert and women's rights activist
- Organization(s): Women's Institute for Alternative Development (WINAD); Women's Institute for Alternative Development (WINAD)

Folade Mutota is a Trinidadian politician, arms control expert, and women's rights activist. She is one of the three founders of the Women's Institute for Alternative Development (WINAD) and coordinates the Caribbean Coalition for Development and the Reduction of Armed Violence (CDRAV).

== Biography ==
Mulata is an arms control expert and coordinates the Caribbean Coalition for Development and the Reduction of Armed Violence (CDRAV). She is one of the three founders of the Women's Institute for Alternative Development (WINAD) and serves as executive director. She has also spoken out against on fat shaming and discrimination.

Mutota served as a Temporary Independent Senator in the Senate (Trinidad and Tobago) during the 11th Republican Parliament of Trinidad and Tobago. She made her maiden contribution on The Firearms (Amendment) Bill (2019).

In 2025, she contributed to Public Policy Making, Gender, and Human Security in the Caribbean.
