= Kareem Marcelle =

Trinidad and Tobago politician

The Honourable Kareem Marcelle MP

Member of Parliament for Laventille West
- Incumbent
- Assumed office 3 May 2025
- Preceded by: Fitzgerald Hinds

Personal details
- Born: 1995 (age 30–31) Laventille, Trinidad
- Party: PNM
- Education: University of the West Indies

Kareem Marcelle (born 1995) is a Trinidad and Tobago politician from the People's National Movement (PNM). He has been MP for Laventille West in the House of Representatives since 2025.

== Early life and education ==
Marcelle comes from Beetham Gardens. He was reportedly born into poverty and attended Sacred Heart Boys’ Primary School. He has two brothers. He was awarded the Makandal Daaga Law Scholarship to study at the University of the West Indies.

== Career ==
Marcelle is an attorney by profession. Marcelle is a community activist. He served as an alderman in Port of Spain. In the 2025 Trinidad and Tobago general election, Marcelle succeeded Fitzgerald Hinds.

== Electoral history ==
2025 Trinidad and Tobago general election: Laventille West
Party	Candidate	Votes	%	±%
PNM	Kareem Marcelle	9,096	68.9%	▼
UNC	Rodney Stowe	2,291	25.9%	▲
PF	Nathaniel Thomas	429	4.9%	Steady
Majority		6,805	43.0%	
Turnout		8,852	35.2%	
Registered electors		25,147		
PNM hold				

== See also ==
- 13th Republican Parliament of Trinidad and Tobago
