= Maxie Cuffie =

Trinidad and Tobago journalist and politician

Maxie Cuffie is a Trinidad and Tobago journalist and politician. Cuffie served as in various capacities in the media, including editor of the Trinidad and Tobago Express, and Head of News for CCN TV6. He represented the La Horquetta/Talparo constituency in the Parliament of Trinidad and Tobago from 2015 to 2020, and served in various ministerial positions, including Minister of Public Administration and Communication.

== Education ==
Cuffie studied economics at the University of the West Indies, and later obtained a Masters of Public Administration from the Harvard Kennedy School.

== Journalism ==
Cuffie served as editor of the Trinidad and Tobago Express, and later was Head of News for CCN TV6. He left CCN TV6 in April 2003 and, in his words, "ceased using the title 'working journalist'". He later wrote a weekly column for the Trinidad and Tobago Guardian.

Cuffie ran a media consultancy firm, Integrated Media Company Ltd (IGM). In 2011, IGM took over management of the Mirror Group Publication which published the TnT Mirror and its sister publications the TnT Mirror Weekend, and Sunday Punch for one year, and Cuffie served as CEO of the company.

== Political career ==
Cuffie contested the La Horquetta/Talparo seat for the People's National Movement in the 2015 general elections. He won the election, and represented the constituency in the 11th Republican Parliament.

Cuffie served as Minister of Communications from 2015 to 2016 and Minister of Public Administration and Communication from 2016 to 2018. He later served as Minister in the Ministry of Public Administration and Communications, Minister in the Ministry of Public Administration, and finally as Parliamentary Secretary in the Ministry of Public Administration.

Cuffie chose not to seek reelection in the 2020 general elections, saying that while he had made a "complete recovery" from the stroke he had in 2017, he wanted to avoid his health from serving as a distraction from "critical issues" during the campaign.

== Personal life ==
Cuffie suffered a stroke in 2012, and second one in September 2017. He was hospitalised at St. Clair Medical Centre in Port of Spain until later October when he was airlifted to Washington DC, where he remained until his return to Trinidad and Tobago on July 26, 2018.
