= Shivanna Sam =

Trinidad and Tobago politician

The Honourable Shivanna Sam MP

Member of Parliament for Cumuto/Manzanilla
- Incumbent
- Assumed office 3 May 2025
- Preceded by: Rai Ragbir

Personal details
- Party: UNC

Shivanna Sam is a Trinidad and Tobago politician from the United National Congress (UNC). She has been MP for Cumuto/Manzanilla in the House of Representatives since 2025.

== Career ==
Shivanna Sam is an environmental expert. She holds a Master of Science in Occupational and Environmental Safety and Health and a Bachelor of Science in Biology and Environmental and Natural Resources Management. At the 2025 Trinidad and Tobago general election, she replaced Rai Ragbir as the UNC candidate.

On 3 May 2025 she was appointed Parliamentary Secretary in Ministry of Public Utilities in the Persad-Bissessar administration.

== Electoral history ==
2025 Trinidad and Tobago general election: Cumuto/Manzanilla
Party	Candidate	Votes	%	±%
UNC	Shivanna Sam	12,559	68.1%	▲
PNM	Sanjiv Boodhu	5,393	29.2%	▼
PF	Valene Teelucksingh	438	2.4%	Steady
Majority		7,166	38.9%	▲
Turnout		18,447	59.94%	
Registered electors		30,776		
UNC hold				

== See also ==
- 13th Republican Parliament of Trinidad and Tobago
