= NiLeung Hypolite =

Politician from Trinidad and Tobago

The Honourable NiLeung Hypolite MP

MP for Laventille West
- In office 2007–2015
- Preceded by: Fitzgerald Hinds

Personal details
- Born: 1970
- Died: October 19, 2024 (aged 53–54)
- Party: People's National Movement (PNM)

NiLeung Hypolite (1970–October 19, 2024) was a Trinidad and Tobago politician who represented the Laventille West constituency between 2007 and 2015, and served as Parliamentary Secretary in the Ministry of Works and Transport.

== Early life and education ==
Hypolite was born in 1970 and educated at Belmont Boys' Secondary School (now St. Francis Boys' College) in Port of Spain.

== Political career ==
Hypolite served as a temporary senator representing the People's National Movement, during the 8th Republican Parliament. He was elected to represent Laventille West in the 2007 general election, and was re-elected in the 2010 general election. Hypolite was screened by the party before the 2015 general election, but was rejected in favour of Fitzgerald Hinds.

From 2007 to 2010 Hypolite served as Parliamentary Secretary in the Ministry of Works and Transport.

== Personal life ==
Hypolite married his wife, Nisa-Marie in 1995, and had one child. After leaving politics, he worked odd jobs before finding a job as a sales representative with the Maritime Financial Group.

Hypolite was diagnosed with acute adult T-cell leukaemia/ lymphoma in 2024, and died on October 19.
