= Lawrence Hislop =

Trinidad and Tobago politician

The Honourable Lawrence Hislop Senator

Member of the Senate of Trinidad and Tobago
- Incumbent
- Assumed office 22 March 2022

Personal details
- Party: People's National Movement (PNM)

Lawrence Hislop is a Trinidad and Tobago politician from the People's National Movement.

== Biography ==
Hislop hails from Tobago and was born into a Seventh-Day Adventist family. Hislop was a candidate in the December 2021 Tobago House of Assembly election in Mason Hall/Moriah.

In 2022, he was appointed to the Senate where he has since sat as a government senator.
