= Jennifer Johnson (Trinidad and Tobago politician) =

Trinidad and Tobago politician

MP for Princes Town
- In office 12 January 1987 – 19 November 1991
- Preceded by: Amoy Mohammed
- Succeeded by: Mohammed Haniff

Personal details
- Born: 17 February 1946
- Died: 1 February 2023 (aged 76)
- Party: People’s National Movement (2000s)
- Other political affiliations: National Alliance for Reconstruction (1990s)

Jennifer Ursula Johnson (17 February 1946 – 1 February 2023) was a Trinidad and Tobago politician.

== Biography ==
Johnson was a former Minister of Youth, Sport, Culture and the Creative Arts in the National Alliance for Reconstruction (NAR) government. She was one of the ministers held hostage during the Jamaat al Muslimeen coup attempt. In 1995, Johnson contested the San Fernando East constituency but lost to former prime minister Patrick Manning. She later left the NAR to join the People’s National Movement (PNM) and presided as Youth Officer Female from 2003 to 2005.

Johnson served as president of the Girls Guides Association, executive director of Junior Achievement (JA) and chair of the Youth Training and Employment Partnership Programme (YTEPP) as well as the Blind Welfare Association.

Johnson died in 2023.

== See also ==
- List of Trinidad and Tobago Members of Parliament
