= Miss Bahamas 2011 =

- Date: May 6, 2011
- Venue: Imperial Ballroom in the Atlantis Resort, Paradise Island, The Bahamas
- Broadcaster: ZNS-TV
- Entrants: 26
- Placements: 10
- Returns: North Eleuthera & San Salvador
- Winner: Anastagia Pierre; Capital City
- Congeniality: Sharie Delva; Freeport
- Best National Costume: Aisha Delaney; Acklins
- Photogenic: Anastagia Pierre; Capital City

The Miss Bahamas 2011 pageant was held on May 6, 2011. Twenty-six candidates competed for the national crown. The chosen winner represented The Bahamas at the Miss Universe 2011 pageant. The costume of the winner of the best national costume award will be used at Miss Universe 2011. Miss World Bahamas entered Miss World 2011. The First Runner Up entered Miss Intercontinental, the Second Runner Up entered Miss Supranational, and the Third Runner Up entered Top Model of the World.

== Final results ==
Final results	Contestant
Miss Universe Bahamas 2011	Capital City - Anastagia Pierre
Miss World Bahamas 2011	South Andros - Sasha Joyce
1st Runner-up	Freeport - Sharie Delva
2nd Runner-up	Central Eleuthera - Daronique Young
3rd Runner-up	Central Abaco - Kristy Evans
Semifinalist	Berry Islands - Sherice King; Black Point - Kerel Pinder; New Providence - Brooke Sherman; North Abaco - LaShawn Gray; North Andros - Kastachia Stuart

=== Special awards ===
- Miss Photogenic - Anastagia Pierre (Capital City)
- Miss Congeniality - Sharie Delva (Freeport)
- Best National Costume - Aisha Delaney (Acklins)

== Official delegates ==
Represent	Contestant	Age	Height	Hometown	Sponsor
Acklins	Aisha Delaney	20	1.85 m (6 ft 1 in)	Nassau	
Berry Islands	Sherice King	22	1.68 m (5 ft 6 in)	Coopers Town	Unique Discovery Construction & Maintenance
Black Point	Kerel Pinder	25	1.72 m (5 ft 7 1/2 in)	Freeport	Lean Cuisine
Capital City	Anastagia Pierre	22	1.81 m (5 ft 11 1/2 in)	Nassau	VPX Redline
Central Abaco	Kristy Evans	18	1.74 m (5 ft 8 1/2 in)	Marsh Harbour	Miss Abaco
Central Andros	Cynthia Bleu	19	1.79 m (5 ft 10 1/2 in)	Nassau	
Central Eleuthera	Daronique Young	20	1.73 m (5 ft 8 in)	Freetown	Hershey's Chocolates
East Grand Bahama	Garelle Hudson	20	1.69 m (5 ft 6 1/2 in)	Freeport	
Exuma	Tomacina Culmer	21	1.82 m (5 ft 11 1/2 in)	Exuma	None
Freeport	Sharie Delva	24	1.86 m (6 ft 1 in)	Freeport	Automall
Grand Cay	Kristen Duncombe	21	1.70 m (5 ft 7 in)	Nassau	Michelle la Gloria
Green Turtle Cay	Reneika Knowles	25	1.71 m (5 ft 7 1/2 in)	West End	Island Luck Casino & Lottery
Harbour Island	Tempestt Stubbs	25	1.77 m (5 ft 9 1/2 in)	Harbour Bay	Universal Wear Clothing Store
Inagua	Ashish Gilbert	23	1.84 m (6 ft 1/2 in)	Nassau	
Long Island	Aquelle Plakaris	21	1.75 m (5 ft 9 in)	Clarence Town	
Mangrove Cay	Enna Thomas	20	1.76 m (5 ft 9 1/2 in)	Nassau	
New Providence	Brooke Sherman	21	1.78 m (5 ft 10 in)	Nassau	Gizmos & Gadgets
North Abaco	LaShawn Gray	24	1.83 m (6 ft 0 in)	Coopers Town	Deranique's Beauty Salon and Eye Candy
North Andros	Kastachia Stuart	23	1.77 m (5 ft 9 1/2 in)	Andros Town	Sand Mine Dredging
North Eleuthera	Alexandra Deal	19	1.68 m (5 ft 6 in)	Freetown	
Rum Cay	Alana Wills	25	1.70 m (5 ft 7 in)	Nassau	
San Salvador	Krystal Brown	21	1.71 m (5 ft 7 1/2 in)	Nassau	
South Andros	Sasha Joyce	23	1.76 m (5 ft 9 1/2 in)	Andros Town	Lucky Restaurant
South Eleuthera	Tyrhonda Knowles	23	1.67 m (5 ft 5 1/2 in)	Freetown	Anchorage Market & Restaurant
Spanish Wells	Isabel Williams	24	1.80 m (5 ft 11 in)	Nassau	
West Grand Bahama	Ronnell Armbrister	22	1.72 m (5 ft 7 1/2 in)	West End	
