= Roger Monroe =

Trinidad and Tobago politician

Member of Parliament for Toco/Sangre Grande
- In office 10 August 2020 – 18 March 2025
- Preceded by: Glenda Jennings-Smith
- Succeeded by: Wayne Sturge

Personal details
- Party: People's National Movement

Roger Monroe is a Trinidad and Tobago politician from the People's National Movement. He was elected MP for Toco/Sangre Grande in the House of Representatives in 2020.

In the 2025 Trinidad and Tobago general election, Monroe was unseated by United National Congress (UNC) candidate Wayne Sturge.

== Electoral history ==
2025 Trinidad and Tobago general election: Toco/Sangre Grande
Party	Candidate	Votes	%	±%
UNC	Wayne Sturge	9,728	55.0%	▲
PNM	Roger Monroe	7,363	41.6%	▼
PF	Elizabeth Wharton	385	2.2%	Steady
NTA	Christine Newallo-Hosein	143	0.8%	Steady
Majority		2,365	13.40%	
Turnout		17,691	56.73%	
Registered electors		31,186		
UNC gain from PNM		Swing	%	

== See also ==
- 12th Republican Parliament of Trinidad and Tobago
