= Jennifer Baptiste-Primus =

Trinidad and Tobago politician

The Honourable Jennifer Baptiste-Primus Senator

Member of the Senate of Trinidad and Tobago
- In office 11 September 2015 – 9 August 2020

Personal details
- Party: People's National Movement (PNM)

Jennifer Baptiste-Primus is a Trinidad and Tobago politician from the People's National Movement.

== Career ==
Jennifer Baptiste-Primus was a Senator and minister of labour under Keith Rowley. She is a member of the PNM national council.

She endorsed Pennelope Beckles-Robinson for PNM leader after the 2025 Trinidad and Tobago general election.
