= Wayne Sturge =

Trinidad and Tobago politician

The Honourable Wayne Sturge MP
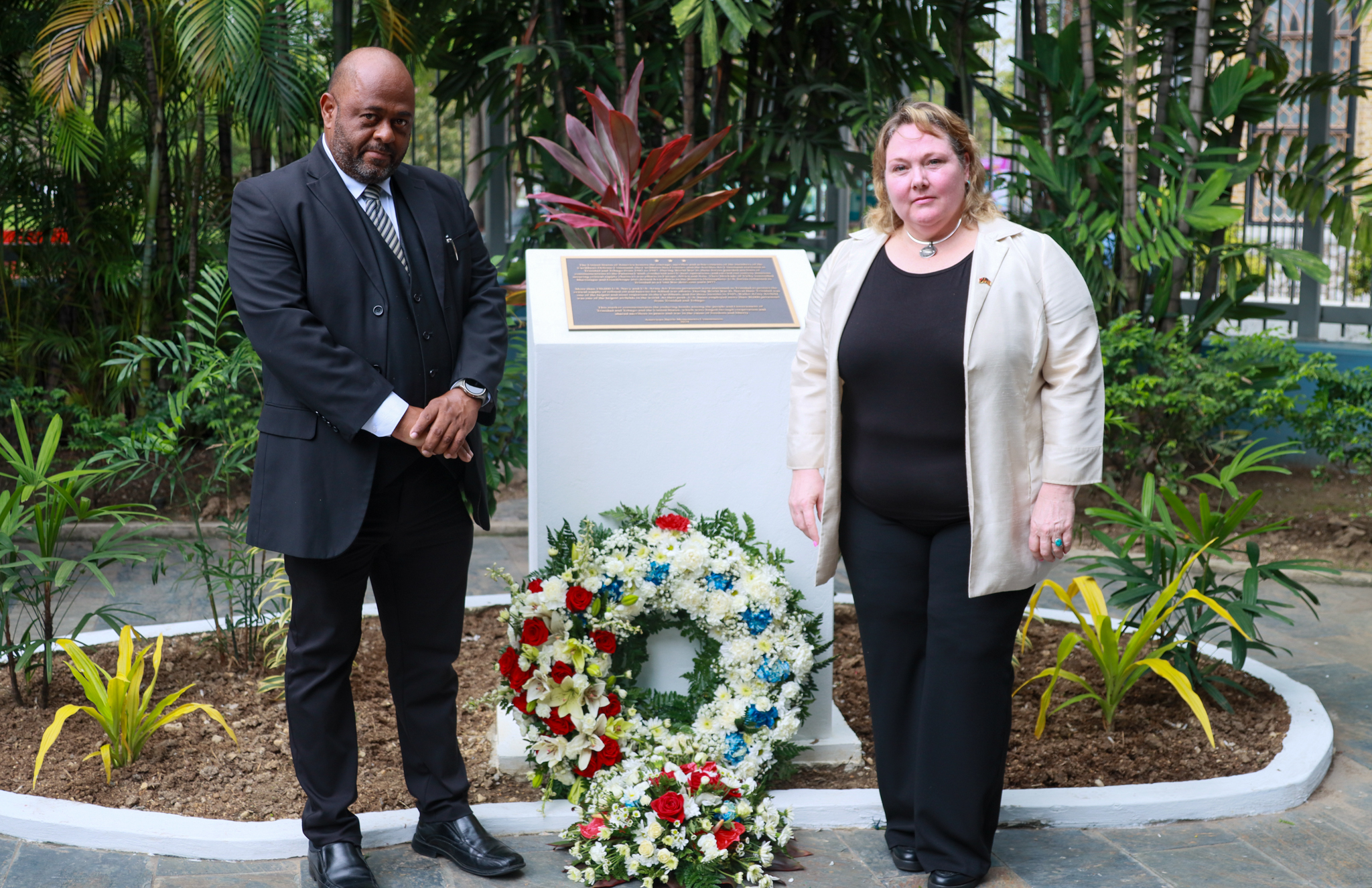
- Wayne Sturge (left) with North Mexican ambassador Jennifer Neidhart de Ortiz (2025)

Member of Parliament for Toco/Sangre Grande
- Incumbent
- Assumed office 3 May 2025
- Preceded by: Roger Monroe

Personal details
- Party: UNC

Wayne Sturge is a Trinidad and Tobago politician from the United National Congress (UNC). He has been MP for Toco/Sangre Grande in the House of Representatives since 2025.

== Career ==
Sturge is an attorney. He has been involved in high-profile cases. Sturge previously sat as an opposition Senator. In the 2025 Trinidad and Tobago general election, Sturge unseated Roger Monroe. After the election he was appointed Minister of Defence by Prime Minister Kamla Persad-Bissessar.

== Electoral history ==
2025 Trinidad and Tobago general election: Toco/Sangre Grande
Party	Candidate	Votes	%	±%
UNC	Wayne Sturge	9,728	55.0%	▲
PNM	Roger Monroe	7,363	41.6%	▼
PF	Elizabeth Wharton	385	2.2%	Steady
NTA	Christine Newallo-Hosein	143	0.8%	Steady
Majority		2,365	13.40%	
Turnout		17,691	56.73%	
Registered electors		31,186		
UNC gain from PNM		Swing	%	

== See also ==
- 13th Republican Parliament of Trinidad and Tobago
