= Hazel Thompson-Ahye =

Politician from Trinidad and Tobago

The Honourable Hazel Thompson-Ahye Senator

Member of the Senate of Trinidad and Tobago
- In office 20 November 2018 – 18 March 2025

Personal details
- Party: Independent

Hazel Thompson-Ahye is a Trinidad and Tobago politician.

== Political career ==
Thompson-Ahye first entered Parliament as an Independent Senator in 2018. She is a lawyer and teacher.
