= Christian Birchwood =

Trinidad and Tobago politician

The Honourable Christian Birchwood MP

Member of Parliament for Laventille East/Morvant
- Incumbent
- Assumed office 3 May 2025
- Preceded by: Adrian Leonce

Personal details
- Party: PNM

Christian Birchwood is a Trinidad and Tobago politician from the People's National Movement (PNM). He has been MP for Laventille East/Morvant in the House of Representatives since 2025.

== Career ==
Birchwood is an engineer by profession. In the 2025 Trinidad and Tobago general election, Birchwood succeeded Adrian Leonce.

== Personal life ==
He is married to his wife Adona Nayak Birchwood.

== Electoral history ==
2025 Trinidad and Tobago general election: Laventille East/Morvant
Party	Candidate	Votes	%	±%
PNM	Christian Birchwood	5,837	59.7%	▼
UNC	Robert Mitchell	3,270	33.4%	▲
PF	Christopher Alexander	577	5.9%	Steady
All People's Party (Trinidad and Tobago)	Steve Stephens	75	0.8%	Steady
Majority		2,567	26.3%	
Turnout		9,781	38.77%	
Registered electors		25,231		
PNM hold				

== See also ==
- 13th Republican Parliament of Trinidad and Tobago
