= Aiyna Ali =

Trinidad and Tobago politician

The Honourable Aiyna Ali MP

Member of Parliament for Princes Town
- Incumbent
- Assumed office 3 May 2025
- Preceded by: Barry Padarath

Personal details
- Born: 1997 (age 28–29) Barrackpore, Trinidad and Tobago
- Party: UNC

Aiyna Ali (born 1997) is a Trinidad and Tobago dentist and politician from the United National Congress (UNC). She has been MP for Princes Town in the House of Representatives since 2025.

== Early life and education ==
Ali was born and raised in Rochard Douglas Road in Barrackpore to Shaffiat and Dianne Ali. The youngest of three daughters, she was educated at Barrackpore ASJA Primary School and at ASJA Girls’ College in San Fernando. She studied at the University of the West Indies and qualified as a dentist in 2025.

== Career ==
Ali is a dentist. At the 2025 Trinidad and Tobago general election, she replaced Barry Padarath as the UNC candidate, who moved to Couva South.

== Personal life ==
Ali is Muslim.

== Electoral history ==
2025 Trinidad and Tobago general election: Princes Town
Party	Candidate	Votes	%	±%
UNC	Aiyna Ali	11,852	75.3%	▲
PNM	Rocklyn Mohammed	2,349	15.9%	▼
PF	Sacha Mangroo	510	3.2%	Steady
Majority		9,503	59.4%	
Turnout		15,751	56.71%	
Registered electors		27,774		
UNC hold		Swing	%	

== See also ==
- 13th Republican Parliament of Trinidad and Tobago
