= Dhanayshar Mahabir =

Trinidad and Tobago economist and senator (born 1959)

Senator Dr Dhanayshar Mahabir (born August 15, 1959) is an economist and served as an Independent Senator in the Trinidad and Tobago Senate from 2013 to 2018.

== Education and career ==
Mahabir was born in 1959 in Trinidad and Tobago and educated at Presentation College, Chaguanas. He received a B.Sc. Economics at the University of the West Indies, St Augustine, followed by an MA (Dean's List) and Ph.D. Economics from McGill University in Montreal, Quebec, Canada.

Until 2011, he was a tenured lecturer at the University of the West Indies, where he taught among others, Intermediate Micro-Economic Theory, Intermediate Macro-Economic Theory, and Advanced Economic Theory. Mahabir was also a financial advisor to Ernst & Young, served as an independent director of the Trinidad and Tobago Stock Exchange, and was the chairman of the committee established to create the CAPE syllabus in Economics.

In the public sector, he served as the chairman of the Public Utilities Commission and the chairman of the tribunal established to determine electricity rates for industrial customers, advised the Trinidad and Tobago Central Bank on Monetary Policy, and worked in liaison with the Ministry of Finance and Standard and Poor's. He was also appointed by Prime Minister Patrick Manning as chairman of the committee established to determine the true state of Public Finances Regionally, Mahabir served as the Country Economist at the Caribbean Development Bank, for Barbados, Dominica, St. Kitts and Nevis, Turks and Caicos, and Montserrat with a focus on structural adjustment programmes, as well as monetary and fiscal policy. Between 1992 and 2012, he served as an economic advisor to the All Trinidad Sugar and General Workers' Trade Union.

== Senate ==
Mahabir was appointed in 1996 as a temporary Independent Senator by President Noor Hassanali, and 2013 as a full-time Independent Senator by President Anthony Carmona for the 10th Republican Parliament. In 2015 he was re-appointed to another term at the Senate where he served as the coordinator of the Independent Senator bench until 2018. Mahabir served on the Business Committee, as well as The Committee on Human Rights, Equality and Diversity, and was chairman of the Committee on Social Services and Public Administration, the Foreign Affairs Committee and vice chairman for the Committee on State Enterprises. He was also a member of the Public Accounts Committee, Public Accounts and Appropriations Committee, Statutory Instruments Committee, Business Committee of the Senate, Privileges Committee, and was a member of Joint Select Committees on Tobago's Internal self government bill and the Insurance Bill
