= Anthony Viera =

Trinidad and Tobago politician

The Honourable Anthony Viera Senator

Member of the Senate of Trinidad and Tobago
- In office 2 August 2013 – Present

Personal details
- Party: Independent

Anthony D. Vieira is a Trinidad and Tobago politician.

== Political career ==
Vieira has been an attorney since 1983. He was appointed to the Senate as an independent senator in 2015. In 2021, the United National Congress wrote to President Paula-Mae Weekes demanding his resignation. Opposition MP Roodal Moonilal questioned his impartiality after he was "gifted silk".
