= Michael de la Bastide =

Trinbagonian lawyer (1937–2024)

The Right Honourable Mr. Justice Michael de la Bastide KC, PC

Crown Counsel in the office of the Attorney-General of Trinidad and Tobago
- In office November 1961 – April 1963

Senator, Republican Parliament of Trinidad and Tobago
- In office 1976–1981

President of the Law Association of Trinidad and Tobago
- In office 1987–1990

Chief Justice of Trinidad and Tobago
- In office 31 May 1995 – 18 July 2002
- Appointed by: President Noor Hassanali

President of the Caribbean Court of Justice
- In office 18 August 2004 – 18 August 2011

Personal details
- Born: 18 July 1937 Port of Spain, Trinidad and Tobago
- Died: 30 March 2024 (aged 86)
- Children: Simon de la Bastide
- Occupation: Lawyer, Judge

Michael de la Bastide, KC, PC (18 July 1937 – 30 March 2024) was a Trinidad and Tobago lawyer. He was the Chief Justice of Trinidad and Tobago from 1995 until 2002.

== Background ==
De la Bastide attended St. Mary’s College, Port of Spain, from 1945 to 1955. He moved on to read law at Christ Church, Oxford from 1956 to 1960. He received a Bachelor of Arts (Jurisprudence) in 1959 with First Class Honours and a Bachelor of Civil Law, also with First Class Honours in 1960. De la Bastide died on 30 March 2024, at the age of 86.

== Career ==
De la Bastide was Crown Counsel in the office of the Attorney-General of Trinidad and Tobago from 1961 till 1963. In 1975, he became a Queen's Counsel at the age of 38. He went on to serve as an Independent Senator from 1976 to 1981 in the Senate of Trinidad and Tobago. He was president of the Law Association from 1987 until 1990 prior to his appointment as Chief Justice in 1995. In 2005, he was sworn in as president of the Caribbean Court of Justice until his retirement in 2011.
