= Camouflage clothing in Trinidad and Tobago =

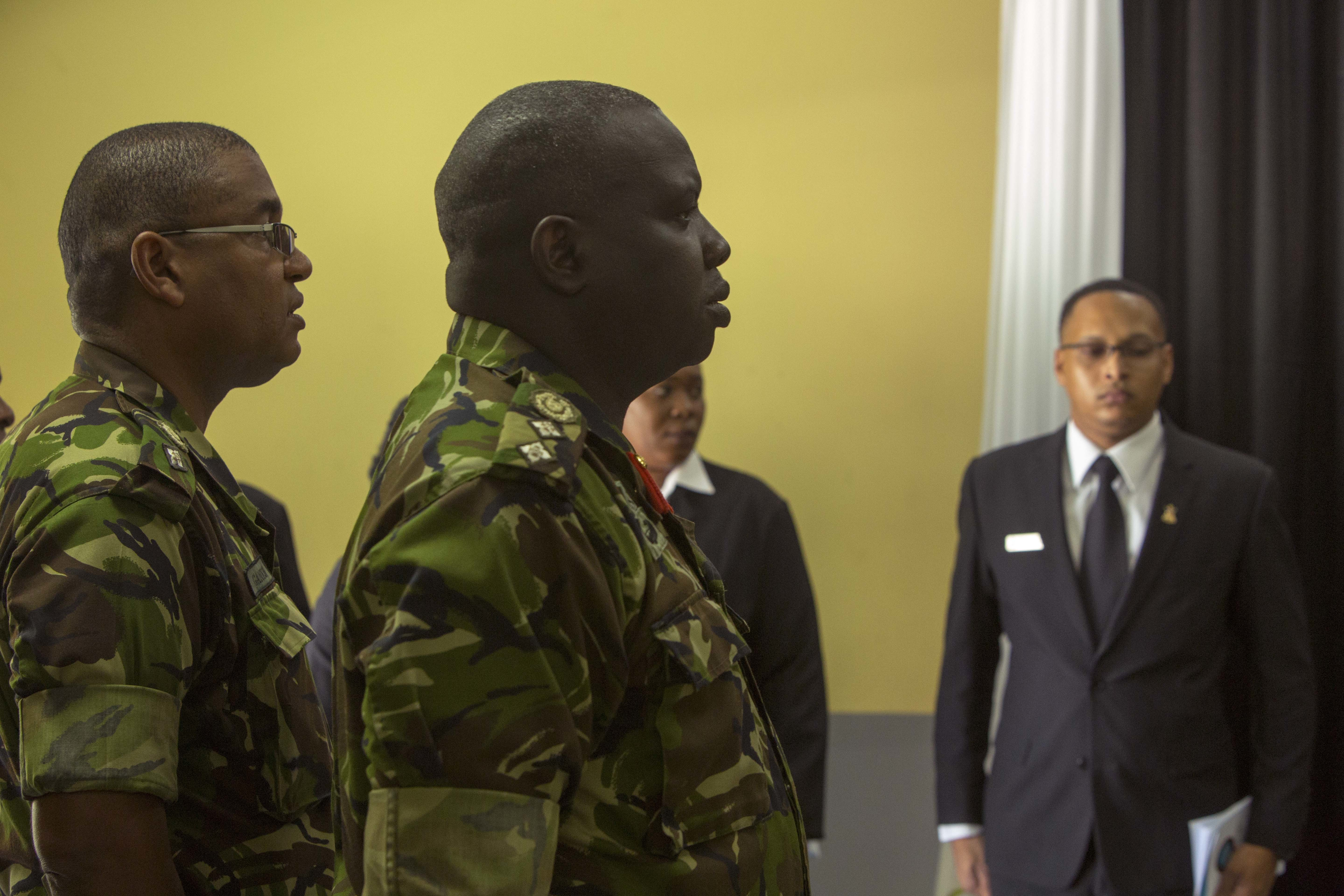
Wearing camouflage in Trinidad and Tobago is only legal for the Defence Force.

Camouflage clothing in Trinidad and Tobago has been a controversial legal issue. Officially, camouflage clothing has been banned for civilians in Trinidad and Tobago and only permitted for the Trinidad and Tobago Defence Force. In recent times, Trinidad and Tobago officials have taken a more relaxed approach towards the matter though importation of any camouflage patterned items remains illegal.

== History ==
Under the Defence Act, the law stated:

"A person, other than a member of the Defence Force, who without lawful excuse (the proof whereof shall lie on him)-(a) wears the uniform or any portion of the uniforms of a member of the Defence Force; or (b) wears any costume or any article of clothing or apparel so closely resembling the uniform or any portion thereof of a member of the Defence Force, as may cause such person to be mistaken for a member of the Defence Force, is liable on summary conviction to a fine of one thousand dollars and to imprisonment for eighteen months."

This was supplemented by the Customs Act that banned the import of any camouflage patterned items. The law was brought in by Legal Notice 33 created by proclamation in 1984 by the President of Trinidad and Tobago Sir Ellis Clarke, which stated that camouflage patterned items could only be imported for the Defence Force. The law has been criticised by members of the Trinidad and Tobago Police Service as the law was intended to stop impersonation of the Defence Force soldiers but led to occasions where toys with camouflage accessories were being confiscated as illegal. This results in a number of occasions at military-themed festivals where the police opted not to enforce the law. Though conversely, they would confiscate any camouflage discovered being sold in shops.

Customs confiscate any camouflage pattern materials that are detected. In 2020, the law was challenged by a man arrested for importing camouflage baby clothes on the grounds that the Legal Notice violated the Constitution of Trinidad and Tobago due to not going through Parliament. In 2021, the High Court ruled that the law against camouflage importation was constitutional.

In 2024, ahead of Carnival, the Minister of National Security Fitzgerald Hinds clarified the law by stating that the law only prohibited camouflage clothing that closely resembled Defence Force uniforms that could mislead people to believe the wearer was a member of the Defence Force. He stated that camouflage accessories and brightly coloured camouflage that was not similar to Defence Force camouflage would not be illegal under the act.

== See also ==
- Dress code
