= Hackshaw (surname) =

Hackshaw is a surname. Notable people with the surname include:

- Elizabeth Walcott-Hackshaw, Trinidadian writer and academic
- Joan Hackshaw-Marslin, Trinidad and Tobago politician
- Neveal Hackshaw, Trinidadian footballer

== See also ==
- Hacksaw
