= Damian Lyder =

Trinidad and Tobago politician

The Honourable Damian Lyder Senator

Member of the Senate of Trinidad and Tobago
- Incumbent
- Assumed office 28 August 2020

Personal details
- Party: United National Congress (UNC)

Damian Lyder is a Trinidad and Tobago politician from the United National Congress.

== Political career ==
He was appointed to the Senate as an opposition senator after the 2020 Trinidad and Tobago general election. Lyder attempted to be screened for selection to be the candidate for Cumuto/Manzanilla in the 2025 Trinidad and Tobago general election, but he was not selected.

== Personal life ==
His ex-wife Stacy Roopnarine was Minister of State in the Ministry of Works and Infrastructure in the People's Partnership government. They married in 2012 and divorced in 2015. He is since remarried and has two children
