= Caribbean Telecommunications Union =

Caribbean Telecommunications Union (CTU)
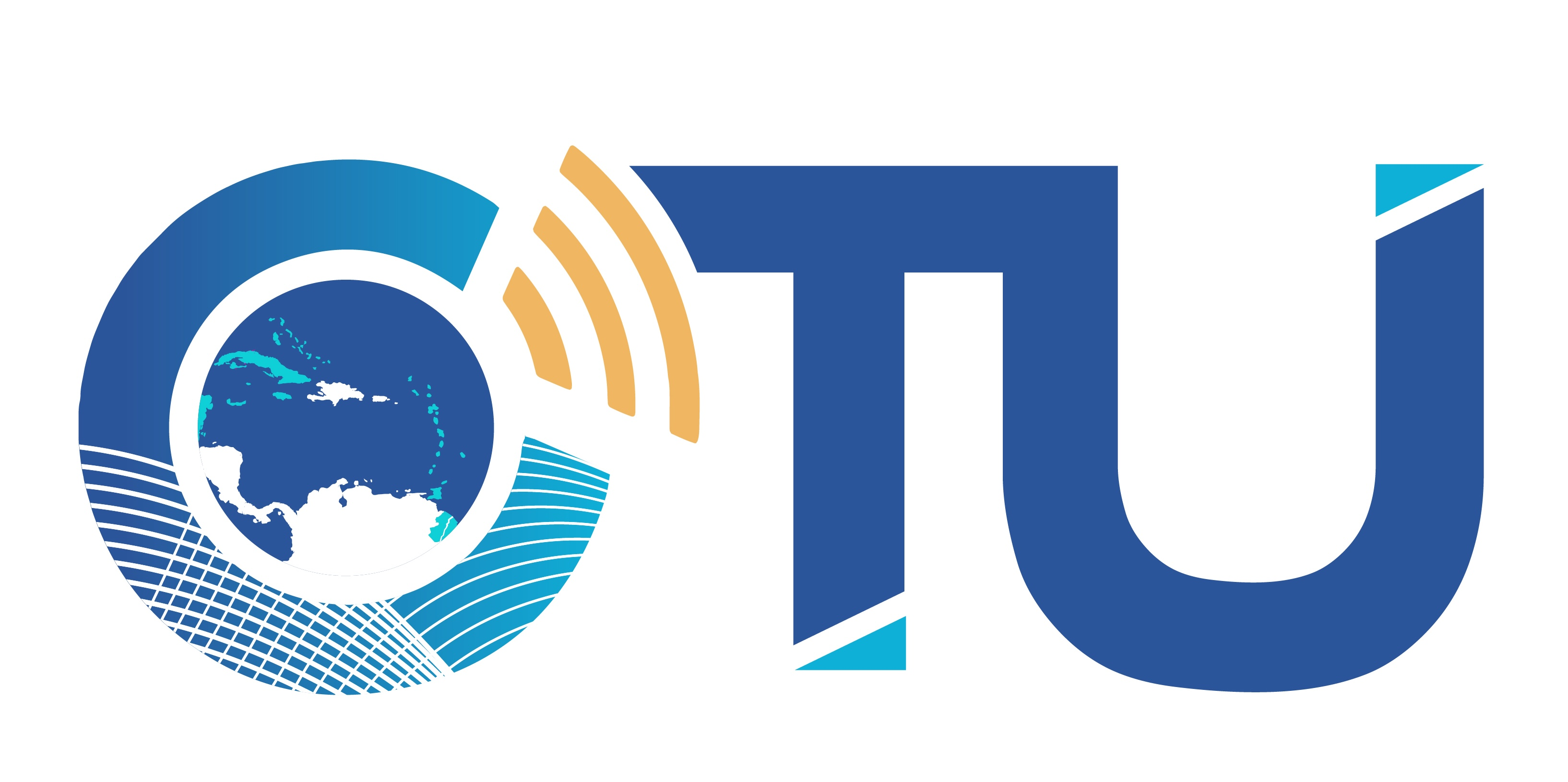
- Abbreviation: CTU
- Formation: 1989
- Headquarters: Trinidad and Tobago
- Secretary General: Rodney Taylor
- President: Hassell Bacchus
- Website: www.ctu.int

The Caribbean Telecommunications Union (CTU) is an intergovernmental organization established by CARICOM in 1989, to facilitate development of the telecommunications sector in the Caribbean.

== Governance ==
=== Secretaries-general ===
Name	Years
Deoraj Ramnarine	1990–1994
Roderick Sanatan	1994–1999
Laurent Justinian Coipel	2000–2002
Bernadette Lewis	2003–2020
Rodney Taylor	2021–present

== Regional initiatives ==
=== Caribbean Internet Governance Forum (CIGF) ===
In 2005, the CTU and the CARICOM Secretariat initiated the CIGF as a regional, multi-stakeholder, annual forum. As part of the 18th CIGF in 2022, the CTU hosted the inaugural Small Island Developing States Internet Governance Forum (SIDS IGF) in Trinidad and Tobago.

=== Other initiatives ===
- Caribbean Regional Communications Infrastructure Programme (CARCIP)
- Caribbean Spectrum Planning and Management Project
- Caribbean Centre of Excellence
- Caribbean ICT Roadshow
- ICT for Persons with Disabilities
- Caribbean Network Operators Group (CaribNOG)

== Member states ==
- Anguilla
- Antigua and Barbuda
- The Bahamas
- Barbados
- Belize
- The British Virgin Islands
- Cayman Islands
- Cuba
- Dominica
- Grenada
- Guyana
- Jamaica
- Montserrat
- (Saint Kitts and Nevis) St. Kitts and Nevis
- (Saint Lucia) St. Lucia
- (Sint Maarten) St. Maarten
- (Saint Vincent and the Grenadines) St. Vincent and the Grenadines
- Suriname
- Trinidad and Tobago
- The Turks and Caicos Islands

Between September and October 2022, 13 of the CTU member states participated in the International Telecommunications Union (ITU) Plenipotentiary Conference (PP-22) in Bucharest, Romania.

== See also ==
- Canadian Radio-television and Telecommunications Commission (CRTC)
- Caribbean Postal Union (CPU)
- Postal Union of the Americas, Spain and Portugal
