= Hassel Bacchus =

Trinidad and Tobago politician

The Honourable Hassel Bacchus Senator

Member of the Senate of Trinidad and Tobago
- Incumbent
- Assumed office 19 August 2020

Minister in the Ministry of Public Administration and Digital Transformation
- In office July 2021 – May 2025

Personal details
- Party: People's National Movement (PNM)
- Education: University of the District of Columbia

Hassel Larry Bacchus is a Trinidad and Tobago politician from the People's National Movement.

== Career ==
Bacchus is a graduate of the University of the District of Columbia in the USA. In 2020 he was appointed to the Senate, and in 2021, he joined the Cabinet as Minister in the Ministry of Public Administration and Digital Transformation. As minister he was responsible for the transition towards e-governance. In 2024, he was re-elected as President of the Caribbean Telecommunications Union.
