= Allyson West =

Trinidad and Tobago politician

The Honourable Allyson West Senator

Member of the Senate of Trinidad and Tobago
- In office 29 June 2017 – 28 April 2025

Personal details
- Party: People's National Movement (PNM)

Allyson West is a Trinidad and Tobago politician from the People's National Movement.

== Political career ==
West was appointed a Senator in 2017. West was appointed Minister in the Ministry of Finance on 30 June 2017 and Minister of Public Administration on 14 August 2019.

West was appointed Minister of Public Administration and Digital Transformation on 19 August 2020.

On 28 September 2020, West was elected Vice-President of the General Conference of Ministers of the Caribbean Telecommunications Union (CTU).
