= Deoroop Teemal =

Trinidadian and Tobagonian politician (1956–2025)

The Honourable Deoroop Teemal Senator

Member of the Senate of Trinidad and Tobago
- In office 20 November 2018 – 3 August 2025

Personal details
- Born: 5 September 1956
- Died: 3 August 2025 (aged 68)
- Party: Independent

Deoroop Teemal (5 September 1956 – 3 August 2025) was a Trinidadian and Tobagonian politician.

== Life and career ==
Teemal was chairman of IDYTT. He was appointed to the Senate as an independent senator in 2018. In 2023, he was elected president of the National Council of Indian Culture (NCIC).

Teemal died on 3 August 2025, at the age of 68. He was replaced in the senate by Sophia Chote.
