= Nela Khan =

Politician from Trinidad and Tobago

MP for Princes Town
- In office 28 May 2010 – 17 June 2015
- Preceded by: constituency re-established
- Succeeded by: Barry Padarath

Personal details
- Political party: United National Congress

Nela Khan is a Trinidad and Tobago politician from the United National Congress (UNC).

== Career ==
In the People's Partnership administration she served as Parliamentary Secretary in the Local Government Ministry. She was later named deputy speaker of the House of Representatives of Trinidad and Tobago.

== See also ==
- List of Trinidad and Tobago Members of Parliament
