= Donna Cox (politician) =

Trinidadian politician (born 1959)

The Honourable Donna Cox Senator
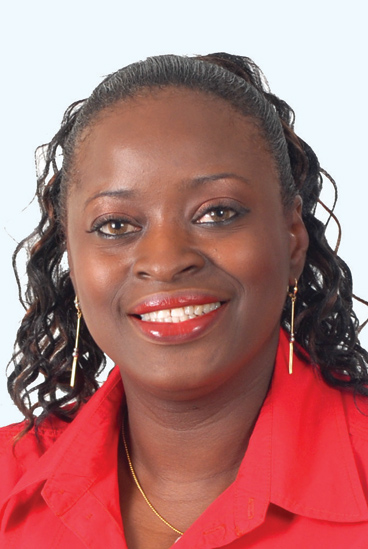

Member of the Senate of Trinidad and Tobago
- Incumbent
- Assumed office 2019

Member of the House of Representatives of Trinidad and Tobago for Laventille East/Morvant
- In office 2007–2015
- Preceded by: Fitzgerald Hinds
- Succeeded by: Adrian Leonce

Personal details
- Born: 4 November 1959 (age 66)
- Party: People's National Movement (PNM)

Donna Cox (born 4 November 1959) is a Trinidad and Tobago politician from the People's National Movement.

== Political career ==
Donna Cox was first elected the 2007 Trinidad and Tobago general election as the member of the House of Representatives for Laventille East/Morvant.

In 2007, Cox was appointed Minister of State in the Ministry of Community Development, Culture and Gender Affairs. On 3 April 2008, Cox was appointed Minister of State in the Ministry of National Security. Cox was re-elected in the 2010 Trinidad and Tobago general election, this time in Opposition. In 2019 Cox was appointed a Senator and Minister of Communications. In 2024, as Social Development and Family Services Minister Cox increased the minimum wage for public servants.
