= Foster Cummings =

Member of Parliament for La Horquetta/Talparo, Trinidad and Tobago

The Honourable Foster Cummings

Minister of Youth Development & National Service of Trinidad and Tobago
- In office 19 April 2021 – 18 March 2025
- Prime Minister: Keith Rowley
- Preceded by: Fitzgerald Hinds

Minister in the Ministry of Works and Transport of Trinidad and Tobago
- In office 19 August 2020 – 18 April 2021
- Prime Minister: Keith Rowley

Member of the House of Representatives for La Horquetta/Talparo
- In office 10 August 2020 – 18 March 2025
- Preceded by: Maxie Cuffie
- Succeeded by: Phillip Watts
- Majority: 9,713 (55.0%)

Government Senator
- In office 14 August 2019 – 31 December 2019
- Prime Minister: Keith Rowley

General Secretary of the People's National Movement
- Incumbent
- Assumed office 30 September 2018
- Preceded by: Ashton Ford

Government Senator
- In office 23 September 2015 – 21 July 2019
- Prime Minister: Keith Rowley

Opposition Senator (Temporary)
- In office 18 June 2010 – 24 June 2014
- Leader: Keith Rowley

Government Senator (Temporary)
- In office 15 January 2008 – 6 April 2010
- Prime Minister: Patrick Manning

Opposition Senator
- Incumbent
- Assumed office 23 May 2025

Personal details
- Born: 1973 (age 52–53) Couva, Trinidad and Tobago
- Party: People's National Movement (1989-present)

Foster Cummings (born in 1973) is a Trinidad and Tobago politician representing the People's National Movement. He was elected Member of Parliament in the House of Representatives for La Horquetta/Talparo in the 2020 general election. He was Minister of Youth Development and National Service under Keith Rowley and General Secretary for the People's National Movement.

== Early life ==
Cummings was born in 1973 and grew up in Indian Trail, Couva. His father is a cane-cutter and his mother is a market vendor. From a young age, Cummings helped his mother sell provisions at the market in Couva. He attended the Tortuga RC, Milton Presbyterian, Couva Junior Secondary, and Carapichaima Senior Comprehensive schools. He attended the Cipriani College of Labour and Co-operative Studies, receiving an associate degree in co-operative studies. He then received a Bachelor of Science in political science and government from the University of the West Indies at St. Augustine.

Cummings began his business career in 1998 and became involved in multiple retail businesses, as well as focusing on the construction and real estate development industries. He is a founding member of the Heliconia Foundation for Young Professionals. He has also worked as a commissioner for the Port Authority of Trinidad and Tobago and as a Cooperative Officer at the Ministry of Labour and Cooperatives.

== Political career ==
Cummings first joined the Couva South Youth League for the People's National Movement (PNM) in 1989 when he was sixteen. He then became the chairman of the Couva South constituency when he was nineteen, the youngest member of the PNM to hold the position. He later served as the chairman of the La Horquetta/Talparo constituency. During his involvement with the PNM, Cummings has served as the party's national male youth officer, then a field officer, an election officer, and the current general secretary. He has been part of the PNM's General Council for thirty years.

On 15 January 2008, Cummings was appointed as a temporary Government Senator in the Senate of Trinidad and Tobago, a position that he held until 6 April 2010. He then served as a temporary Opposition Senator from 18 June 2010 until 24 June 2014 when the People's Partnership coalition took control of Parliament in the 2010 general election. He was made a permanent Government Senator from 23 September 2015 to 31 December 2019. While a senator, he served on the Public Accounts (Enterprises) Committee, the Government Assurances Committees, the Committee on State Enterprises, and the Public Administration and Appropriation Committee. He was appointed as the Parliamentary Secretary in the Ministry of Rural Development and Local Government on 1 January 2020.

Cummings was first elected to the House of Representatives on 10 August 2010, following the 2020 general election where he ran as the PNM candidate for the constituency of La Horquetta/Talparo. He was appointed Minister of Works and Transport on 19 August 2020 and then reassigned to be Minister of Youth Development and National Service on 19 April 2021.

In the 2025 Trinidad and Tobago general election, he was unseated by UNC candidate Phillip Watts. He returned to the senate as an opposition senator.

== Personal life ==
Cummings is married and has six daughters and a son. He is a Spiritual Baptist.

== Electoral history ==
2025 Trinidad and Tobago general election: La Horquetta/Talparo
Party	Candidate	Votes	%	±%
UNC	Phillip Watts	9,585	56.5%	▲12.35
PNM	Foster Cummings	6,712	39.6%	▼15.43
PF	Rekeisha Francois	502	3.0%	Steady
NTA	Alvin Cudjoe	107	0.6%	Steady
Majority		2,873	16.9%	
Turnout		16,960	58.36%	
Registered electors		29,061		
UNC gain from PNM		Swing	13.89%	
