= Phillip Alexander (politician) =

Trinidad and Tobago politician

The Honourable Phillip Alexander Senator

Senator of Trinidad and Tobago
- Incumbent
- Assumed office 7 May 2025

Personal details
- Party: United National Congress (since 2025)
- Other political affiliations: Progressive Empowerment Party (until 2025)

Phillip Edward Alexander is a Trinidad and Tobago politician.

== Career ==
Alexander was the leader of the Progressive Empowerment Party (PEP). After the 2025 general elections Alexander was appointed to the Senate and given the role of Minister in the Ministry of Housing and Urban Development in the Persad-Bissessar administration.

== Electoral history ==
2025 Trinidad and Tobago general election: Port of Spain North/Saint Ann's West
Party	Candidate	Votes	%	±%
PNM	Stuart Young	7,243	67.0%	▼
PEP	Phillip Edward Alexander	2,597	24.0%	Steady
Independent	Vivian Johnson	478	4.4%	Steady
NTA	Richard Thomas	433	4.1%	Steady
Majority		4,646	43.0%	▼
Turnout		10,809	42.11%	
Registered electors		25,670		
PNM hold				
