= Kazim Hosein =

Trinidad and Tobago politician

The Honourable Kazim Hosein Senator

Member of the Senate of Trinidad and Tobago
- Incumbent
- Assumed office 31 October 2016

Minister of Agriculture, Land and Fisheries
- Incumbent
- Assumed office 22 March, 2022

Personal details
- Party: People's National Movement (PNM)

Kazim Hosein is a Trinidad and Tobago politician from the People's National Movement.

== Career ==
As a teenager, Hosein started work in the office of the San Fernando Borough Corporation (SFBC). Both he and his father, Rakeeb Hosein, were mayors of San Fernando. He was head of the San Fernando City Corporation’s hurricane relief campaign in Haiti.

In 2016 he was appointed to the Senate, where he was the only Muslim in the Cabinet. In March 2022, he was appointed Minister of Agriculture, Land and Fisheries. Until then he was Minister of Rural Development and Local Government.
