= Janelle John-Bates =

Trinidad and Tobago politician

The Honourable Janelle John-Bates Senator

Senator of Trinidad and Tobago
- Incumbent
- Assumed office 23 May 2025

Personal details
- Party: People's National Movement
- Education: St. Joseph's Convent, P.O.S., University of Warwick, University of the West Indies, St. Augustine

Janelle John-Bates is a Trinidad and Tobago politician. She was appointed to the Senate in May 2025.

She was a candidate for assistant general secretary position of the PNM in 2022.

After earning an Open National Scholarship from Trinidad and Tobago, Janelle pursued her undergraduate law degree in the United Kingdom. She was subsequently called to the Bar of England and Wales and to the Bar of Trinidad and Tobago. Janelle also attained a Master of Law (Corporate and Commercial) with Distinction from the University of the West Indies, St. Augustine.
