= Brian Baig =

Trinidad and Tobago politician

The Honourable Brian Baig Senator

Senator of Trinidad and Tobago
- Incumbent
- Assumed office 23 May 2025
- In office 12 December 2017 – 30 April 2019
- In office 4 November 2008 – 4 November 2008

Personal details
- Party: United National Congress

Brian Nathaniel Baig is a Trinidad and Tobago politician from the United National Congress (UNC).

== Career ==
Baig is an attorney by profession.
