= Hansen Narinesingh =

Trinidad and Tobago politician

The Honourable Hansen Narinesingh MP

Member of Parliament for Claxton Bay
- Incumbent
- Assumed office 3 May 2025
- Preceded by: David Lee (Pointe-à-Pierre)

Personal details
- Party: UNC

Hansen Narinesingh is a Trinidad and Tobago politician from the United National Congress (UNC). He has been MP for Claxton Bay in the House of Representatives since 2025.

== Career ==
Narinesingh is an attorney. He was elected in the 2025 Trinidad and Tobago general election. He was appointed Parliamentary Secretary in the Ministry of Tertiary Education and Skills Training by Prime Minister Kamla Persad-Bissessar.

== Electoral history ==
2025 Trinidad and Tobago general election: Claxton Bay
Party	Candidate	Votes	%	±%
UNC	Hansen Narinesingh	9,969	64.5%	▲
PNM	Mukesh Ramsingh	4,934	31.9%	▼
PF	Thelston Jagoo	530	3.4%	Steady
Majority		5,035	32.6%	
Turnout		15,467	59.31%	
Registered electors		26,078		
UNC hold				

== See also ==
- 13th Republican Parliament of Trinidad and Tobago
