= Maria Dillon-Remy =

Politician from Trinidad and Tobago

The Honourable Maria Dillon-Remy Senator

Member of the Senate of Trinidad and Tobago
- In office 20 November 2018 – 18 March 2025

Personal details
- Party: Independent

Maria Dillon-Remy is a Trinidad and Tobago politician.

== Political career ==
Dillon-Remy is from Tobago. She first entered Parliament as an Independent Senator in 2018 and is a medical doctor specialising in paediatrics.
