= Phillip Watts =

Trinidad and Tobago politician

The Honourable Phillip Watts MP

Member of Parliament for La Horquetta/Talparo
- Incumbent
- Assumed office 3 May 2025
- Preceded by: Foster Cummings

Personal details
- Party: UNC
- Other political affiliations: PNM (previously)

Phillip Watts is a Trinidad and Tobago politician from the United National Congress (UNC). He has been MP for La Horquetta/Talparo in the House of Representatives since 2025.

== Career ==
Watts is a businessman. He was previously the executive chairman of the People's National Movement (PNM) in La Horquetta/Talparo constituency.

In the 2025 Trinidad and Tobago general election, Watts unseated Foster Cummings. After the election he was appointed Parliamentary Secretary in the Minister of Sport and Youth Affairs by Prime Minister Kamla Persad-Bissessar.

== Electoral history ==
2025 Trinidad and Tobago general election: La Horquetta/Talparo
Party	Candidate	Votes	%	±%
UNC	Phillip Watts	9,585	56.5%	▲12.35
PNM	Foster Cummings	6,712	39.6%	▼15.43
PF	Rekeisha Francois	502	3.0%	Steady
NTA	Alvin Cudjoe	107	0.6%	Steady
Majority		2,873	16.9%	
Turnout		16,960	58.36%	
Registered electors		29,061		
UNC gain from PNM		Swing	13.89%	

== See also ==
- 13th Republican Parliament of Trinidad and Tobago
