= Freetown, Bahamas =

Freetown
- Location within Bahamas
- Coordinates: 24°046′N 76°016′W
- Country: Bahamas
- Island: Eleuthera

Population (2012)
  - Total: 3,138
- Time zone: UTC-5 (Eastern Time Zone)
- Area code: 242

Freetown is an area in the Bahamas located on the island of Eleuthera. As of 2018, it had a population of about 100.

It should not be confused with the Freetown parliamentary constituency on the island of New Providence, which saw 4,004 votes cast in the 2017 election. There is also an area on the island of Grand Bahama called Freetown.

The area on Eleuthera is just east of the more populated town (or settlement) of Deep Creek. It is also 2 miles west of the settlement of Waterford. Freetown has no local government and thus would not be considered a settlement by Bahamas standards. This area is located on the southern (east-west) Deep Creek road at the intersection of Freetown Boulevard. At this corner is the Deep Creek Elementary. Up Freeton Blvd. to the north are a few homes and apartments. All public utilities are available in this area as well as cell phone coverage. The closest airport is located to the north at Rock Sound.
