= Joan Hackshaw-Marslin =

Trinidad and Tobago politician

The Honourable Joan Hackshaw-Marslin

Member of the Senate
- In office 2002–2007

Personal details
- Born: 1951
- Died: 23 April 2020 (aged 69)
- Party: People's National Movement

Joan Hackshaw-Marslin (1951 – 23 April 2020) was a Trinidad and Tobago politician. She served in the Senate of Trinidad and Tobago. She was appointed to the Senate as a temporary replacement for Linda Baboolal.

== Early life and education ==
Hackshaw-Marslin was born to Madonna and Carlton Hackshaw in 1951.

== Career ==
Between 1992 and 1996, Hackshaw-Marslin served as an alderman of Port-of-Spain. From 1995 to 2003, she was elected to the Youth Office Female position of the People's National Movement party's national executive board. She was a member of the Port of Spain North and St Ann's West constituency for decades.

In November 2003, during the 8th Republican Parliament, Hackshaw-Marslin was appointed as a temporary member of the Senate as a replacement for Senate President Dr. Linda Baboolal. Baboolal had been appointed acting President of Trinidad and Tobago while President George Maxwell Richards was out of the country for a few days. Baboolal appointed Hackshaw-Marslin as temporary government senator of the People's National Movement (PNM) with advice from the Prime Minister. In 2006, Hackshaw-Marslin was appointed to temporarily replace Senator Christine Sahadeo, who was ill.

== Personal life ==
Hackshaw-Marslin had one son, Richard Deleon. Her brother, Irwin Hackshaw, is a former deputy police commissioner who left his position after investigation by the Police Complaints Authority. He was suspected of inappropriately receiving "millions of dollars" from various businesses and organizations. Her other brother, Stirling Hackshaw, was an acting assistant commissioner of police upon retirement.
