= Courtney McNish =

Trinidad and Tobago politician

The Honourable Courtney McNish Senator

Senator of Trinidad and Tobago
- Incumbent
- Assumed office 23 May 2025

Personal details
- Party: Independent

Courtney Arthur McNish is a Trinidad and Tobago politician.

== Career ==
McNish was a member of the Police Service Commission until 2021.
