= Alicia Lalite-Ettienne =

Trinidad and Tobago politician

The Honourable Alicia Lalite-Ettienne Senator

Senator of Trinidad and Tobago
- Incumbent
- Assumed office 23 May 2025

Personal details
- Party: Independent
- Education: University of the West Indies

Alicia Pauline Lalite-Ettienne is a Trinidad and Tobago politician. She was appointed to the Senate in May 2025.

== Biography ==
Lalite-Ettienne graduated from the University of the West Indies. She hails from Carenage. Lalite-Ettienne has retinitis pigmentosa. She is the first person who is visually impaired to be appointed to the Senate.
