= University of Trinidad and Tobago =

University in Wallerfield, Trinidad and Tobago

Coordinates: 10°37′00″N 61°13′00″W

- Motto: Education with a global vision
- Type: Public
- Established: 2004
- President: Professor Prakash Persad (Acting)
- Location: Wallerfield, Arima, Trinidad and Tobago
- Website: www.utt.edu.tt
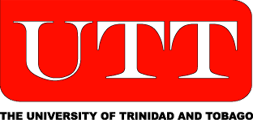

The University of Trinidad and Tobago, also known as UTT, is a state owned university in Trinidad and Tobago established in 2004. Its main campus, currently under construction, will be located at Wallerfield in Trinidad. Presently, its campuses are an amalgamation of several former technological colleges throughout the country.

It is one of three universities in Trinidad and Tobago, the others being the University of the West Indies and University of the Southern Caribbean.

== Presidents ==
- Prakash Persad (acting)

== Campuses ==
The University is a multi-campus facility with major campuses located as follows :

- Camden Campus
- O'Meara Campus
- Valsayn Campus
- Corinth Campus
- Chaguanas Campus
- Point Lisas Campus
- John S. Donaldson Campus (Rebranded as the Creativity Campus)
- San Fernando Campus
- Chaguaramas Campus
- Tobago Campus
- The Eastern Caribbean Institute of Agriculture and Forestry (E.C.I.A.F.)
- Tamana InTech Park, Wallerfield, site of the University's Signature Complex and Main Campus. Construction has started, but the complex is not yet finished.
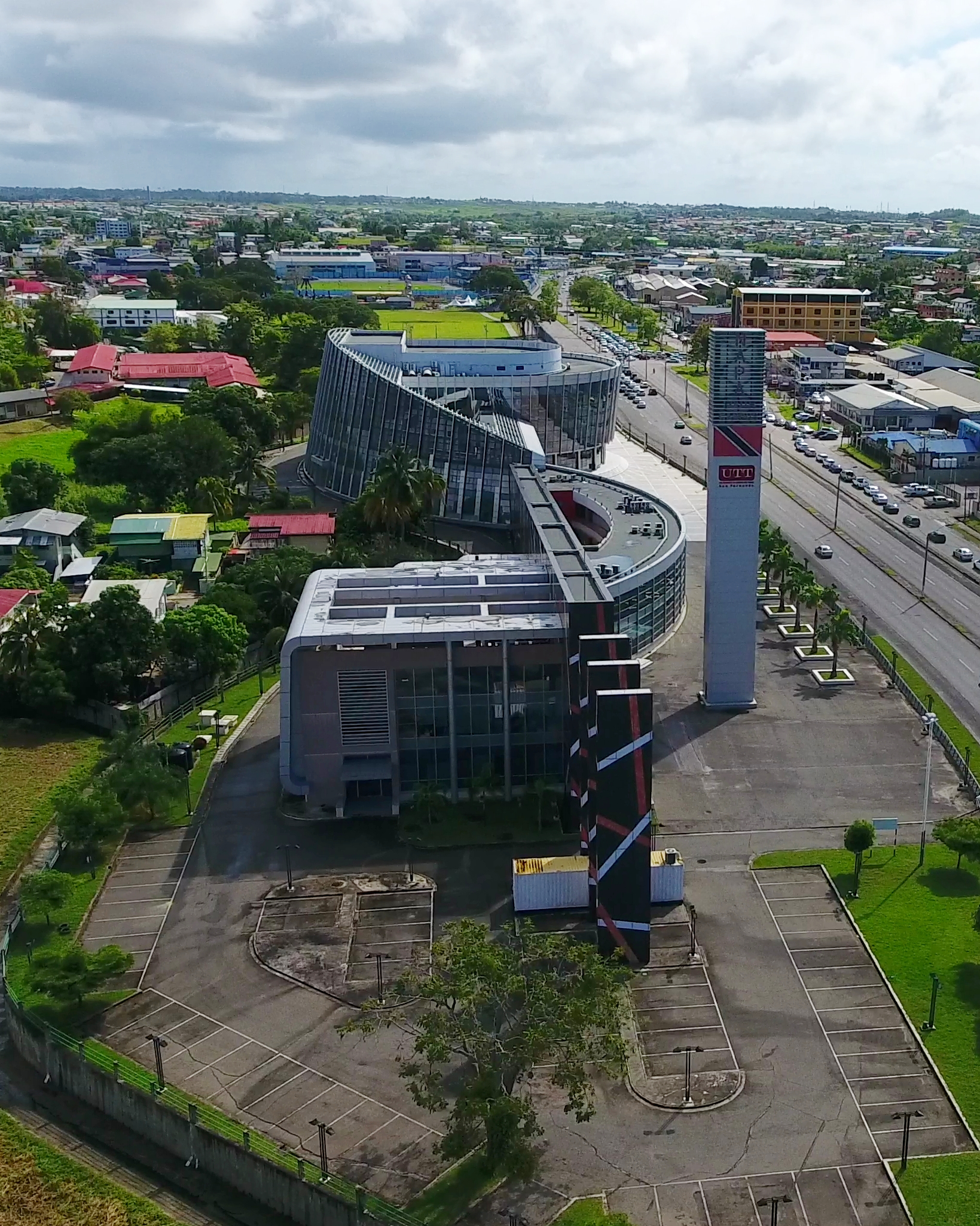
San Fernando campus

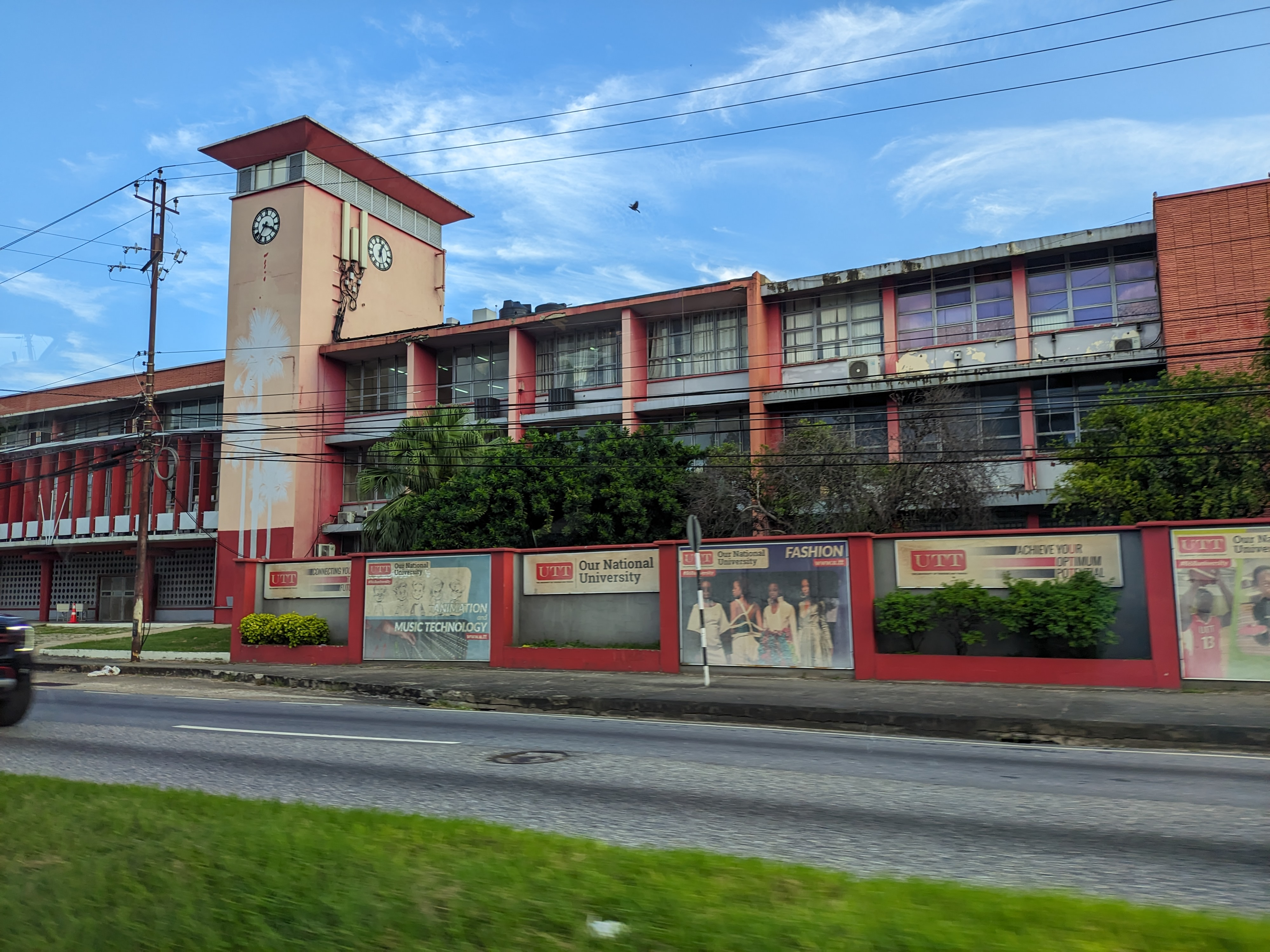
John Donaldson campus (Port of Spain)
