= Francis Lewis (Trinidad and Tobago politician) =

Trinidad and Tobago politician

The Honourable Francis Lewis Senator

Senator of Trinidad and Tobago
- Incumbent
- Assumed office 23 May 2025

Personal details
- Party: Independent

Francis Lewis is a Trinidad and Tobago politician. He was appointed to the Senate in May 2025.
