= Glenda Jennings-Smith =

Trinidad and Tobago politician

Member of Parliament for Toco/Sangre Grande
- In office 2015–2020
- Preceded by: Rupert Griffith
- Succeeded by: Roger Monroe

Personal details
- Party: People's National Movement
- Education: University of Cambridge

Glenda Jennings-Smith is a Trinidad and Tobago politician from the People's National Movement.

== Career ==
Jennings-Smith was a former Assistant Commissioner of Police (ACP). She retired to run as a candidate in the 2015 Trinidad and Tobago general election.

She was MP for Toco/Sangre Grande in the House of Representatives from 2015 to 2020. In the government of Keith Rowley, she served as Parliamentary Secretary in the Ministry of National Security. She was deselected for the 2020 Trinidad and Tobago general election in favour of cricketer Mervyn Dillon.
