= Kama Maharaj =

Trinidad and Tobago businessman

The Honourable Kama Maharaj Senator

Senator of Trinidad and Tobago
- Incumbent
- Assumed office 7 May 2025

Personal details
- Party: United National Congress
- Other political affiliations: National Alliance for Reconstruction; Congress of the People

Satyakama "Kama" Maharaj is a Trinidad and Tobago businessman who is the Minister of Trade, Investment, and Tourism in the Persad-Bissessar administration.

== Early life and education ==
Maharaj is the son of Ramdoolarie Maharaj, better known as "Madame Maharaj", a pioneer in the beauty industry in Trinidad and Tobago. Maharaj earned a degree in economics.

== Career ==
Maharaj worked as a mathematics teacher before entering the cosmetics business. He went on to found Sacha Cosmetics.

After the 2025 general elections Maharaj was appointed to the Senate and given the role of Minister of Trade, Investment, and Tourism, which combines the former Ministry of Trade and Industry with that of the Ministry of Tourism, Culture, and the Arts.
