= Wallerfield =

Coordinates: 10°37′48″N 61°13′31″W

- Community
- Interactive map of Wallerfield
- Country: Trinidad and Tobago
- Region: Tunapuna–Piarco

Population (2011)
  - Total: 4,218
- ZIP code: 350462

Wallerfield is a residential and industrial area east of Arima in Trinidad and Tobago. It served as Waller Air Force Base, and since the closure of U.S. Army base in May 1949 it became the informal home of various types of racing (using former airstrips to make a racetrack known as Wallerfield International Raceway) for over 40 years. It is the site of a new multimillion-dollar University of Trinidad and Tobago campus complex, as well as several housing developments and other projects. Further projects were planned transforming it into Trinidad and Tobago's first science and technology research park, known as the Tamana InTech Park.
