= Paul Richards (Trinidad and Tobago politician) =

Trinidad and Tobago politician

The Honourable Paul Richards Senator

Member of the Senate of Trinidad and Tobago
- In office 23 September 2015 – 18 March 2025

Personal details
- Party: Independent

Paul Richards is a Trinidad and Tobago politician.

== Political career ==
He was appointed to the Senate as an independent senator in 2015.

== Personal life ==
His mother was a victim of domestic violence.
