= Candice Jones-Simmons =

Trinidad and Tobago politician

The Honourable Candice Jones-Simmons Senator

Senator of Trinidad and Tobago
- Incumbent
- Assumed office 23 May 2025

Personal details
- Party: Independent

Candice Jones-Simmons is a Trinidad and Tobago politician. She was appointed to the Senate in May 2025.

She is a professor at the University of the West Indies.
