= Carolyn Seepersad =

American mechanical engineer

Carolyn Conner Seepersad is an American mechanical engineer and Eugene C. Gwaltney, Jr. School Chair, George W. Woodruff School of Mechanical Engineering at Georgia Tech, and editor-in-chief of the ASME Journal of Mechanical Design. Topics in her research include additive manufacturing, stereolithography, the integration of design simulation with rapid prototyping, and the use in vibration isolation and impact protection of 3d structures with unusual mechanical properties such as anisotropic or negative stiffness.

== Education and career ==
Seepersad was the youngest of three sisters in a farming family in Valley Fork, West Virginia; her father was a retired Air Force non-commissioned officer. She majored in mechanical engineering at West Virginia University, graduating in 1996. She went to the University of Oxford as a Rhodes Scholar, earning a combined bachelor's and master's degree in philosophy, politics and economics in 1998. It was at Oxford that she met her husband, Clyde Seepersad, another Rhodes Scholar from Trinidad and Tobago. Next, she went to Georgia Tech for doctoral study in mechanical engineering, earning another master's degree in 2001 and completing her Ph.D. in 2004.

She became an assistant professor of mechanical engineering at the University of Texas at Austin in 2005. She was founding director of the Center for Additive Manufacturing and Design Innovation there, before returning to Georgia Tech in 2023 as Woodruff professor. In 2026 she was named Eugene C. Gwaltney, Jr. School Chair.

She became editor-in-chief of the ASME Journal of Mechanical Design in 2023.

== Recognition ==
Seepersad was a 2010 recipient of the University of Texas Regents' Outstanding Teaching Awards. In 2013, she received the Outstanding New Mechanical Engineering Educator award of the American Society for Engineering Education. In 2019, the West Virginia University Mechanical and Aerospace Engineering Department listed Seepersad in their Academy of Distinguished Alumni. In 2020, she was named to the University of Texas System Academy of Distinguished Teachers.

In 2009, Seepersad received the inaugural International Outstanding Young Researcher in Freeform and Additive Manufacturing Award, given annually at the Solid Freeform Fabrication Symposium. Seepersad was named a Fellow of the American Society of Mechanical Engineers (ASME) in 2020. She received the 2022 Design Automation Award of the ASME, given in recognition of "sustained meritorious contribution to research in Design Automation".
