= Rai Ragbir =

Trinidad and Tobago politician

The Honourable Rai Ragbir MP

Member of Parliament for Cumuto/Manzanilla
- In office 19 August 2020 – 18 March 2025
- Preceded by: Christine Newallo-Hosein
- Succeeded by: Shivanna Sam

Personal details
- Party: Independent (since 2025)
- Other political affiliations: UNC (until 2025)
- Education: University of the West Indies

Rai Ragbir is a Trinidad and Tobago politician. He represented Cumuto/Manzanilla in the House of Representatives from 2020 to 2025.

== Biography ==
In 1990, he graduated as a Medical Doctor from the University of the West Indies and completed his postgraduate studies in family medicine in the United Kingdom.

In 2024, Ragbir broke rank with his party to vote in favour of Government's Whistleblower Protection Bill 2024 in the House of Representatives. In March 2025, he left the United National Congress calling it a "personality cult". He did not stand in the 2025 Trinidad and Tobago general election.
