= Marlene Attzs =

Trinidad and Tobago politician

The Honourable Marlene Attzs Senator

Senator of Trinidad and Tobago
- Incumbent
- Assumed office 23 May 2025

Personal details
- Party: Independent

Marlene Attzs is a Trinidad and Tobago politician. She was appointed to the Senate in May 2025.

Doctor Marlene Attzs is an economist by profession. She is a professor at the University of the West Indies.
