= Kenya Charles =

Trinidad and Tobago politician

The Honourable Kenya Charles Senator

Senator of Trinidad and Tobago
- Incumbent
- Assumed office 23 May 2025

Vice President of the Senate of Trinidad and Tobago
- Incumbent
- Assumed office 23 May 2025

Personal details
- Party: United National Congress

Kenya Charles is a Trinidad and Tobago politician. She was appointed to the Senate in May 2025.

She was elected Vice President of the Senate.
