= Varma Deyalsingh =

Trinidad and Tobago politician

The Honourable Varma Deyalsingh Senator

Member of the Senate of Trinidad and Tobago
- In office 19 October 2018 – 11 September 2023

Personal details
- Party: Independent

Varma Deyalsingh is a Trinidad and Tobago politician.

== Early life ==
His father Lennox Deyalsingh was a former justice.

== Political career ==
Deyalsingh first entered Parliament as an Independent Senator in 2018.

He rejected the Miscellaneous Provisions (Establishment of the Borough of Diego Martin and Borough of Siparia) Bill.
