= Adrian Leonce =

Trinidad and Tobago politician

The Honourable Adrian Leonce MP

Member of Parliament for Laventille East/Morvant
- In office 7 September 2015 – 18 March 2025
- Preceded by: Donna Cox
- Succeeded by: Christian Birchwood

Personal details
- Party: People's National Movement

Adrian Leonce is a Trinidad and Tobago politician. He represented Laventille East/Morvant in the House of Representatives from 2015 to 2025.

On 17 March 2025, he was appointed minister of housing. He did not stand for re-election in the 2025 Trinidad and Tobago general election.
