= Rohan Sinanan =

Trinidad and Tobago politician

The Honourable Rohan Sinanan Senator

Member of the Senate of Trinidad and Tobago
- Incumbent
- Assumed office 24 November 2015

Minister of Works and Transport
- Incumbent
- Assumed office 9 September 2015

Personal details
- Born: Sangre Grande
- Party: People's National Movement (PNM)

Rohan Sinanan is a Trinidad and Tobago politician from the People's National Movement.

== Early life ==
Sinanan was born in Sangre Grande. His parents were Leelamatie (Leela) Sinanan and Basdeo Sinanan. He is of Indian heritage.

== Career ==
Sinanan was the Chief Executive Officer of a large holdings company and holds an MBA in Business Administration. Sinanan was Minister of Works and Transport under Keith Rowley. He was the only Hindu in the Cabinet. As minister he oversaw the construction of the new Elmina Clarke-Allen Highway.

== Personal life ==
He and his wife Pamela Ramkissoon-Sinanan have one child.
