= Christine Newallo-Hosein =

Trinidadian politician

The Honourable Christine Newallo-Hosein MP

Member of Parliament for Cumuto/Manzanilla
- In office 2015–2020
- Preceded by: Collin Partap
- Succeeded by: Rai Ragbir

Personal details
- Party: NTA
- Other political affiliations: UNC

Christine Newallo-Hosein is a Trinidad and Tobago politician. She was MP for Cumuto/Manzanilla in the House of Representatives from 2015 to 2020.

== Early life ==
Newallo-Hosein was raised in Morvant as the youngest of six children.

== Career ==
She first stood for election in the 2007 Trinidad and Tobago general election in Tunapuna for the United National Congress. She was a Senator and Minister of the People and Social Development from 2010 to 2015.

In the 2015 Trinidad and Tobago general election she was elected MP for Cumuto/Manzanilla. She was not selected to recontest the seat in 2020. She worked as a senior advisor to the prime minister and other ministers.

She is the National Transformation Alliance candidate for Toco/Sangre Grande in the 2025 Trinidad and Tobago general election.

== Personal life ==
Christine Newallo-Hosein is a Christian. In 2005, her son Imran Hosein, was kidnapped and held for 18 days before being released.

== Electoral history ==
2025 Trinidad and Tobago general election: Toco/Sangre Grande
Party	Candidate	Votes	%	±%
UNC	Wayne Sturge	9,728	55.0%	▲
PNM	Roger Monroe	7,363	41.6%	▼
PF	Elizabeth Wharton	385	2.2%	Steady
NTA	Christine Newallo-Hosein	143	0.8%	Steady
Majority		2,365	13.40%	
Turnout		17,691	56.73%	
Registered electors		31,186		
UNC gain from PNM		Swing	%	
