= Melanie Roberts-Radgman =

Trinidad and Tobago politician

The Honourable Melanie Roberts-Radgman Senator

Senator of Trinidad and Tobago
- Incumbent
- Assumed office 23 May 2025

Personal details
- Party: People's National Movement
- Education: Harvard Law School

Melanie Roberts-Radgman is a Trinidad and Tobago politician. She was appointed to the Senate in May 2025.

Roberts-Radgman is from Tobago and graduated from Harvard University School of Law.
