= Darrell Allahar =

Trinidad and Tobago politician

The Honourable Darrell Allahar Senator

Senator of Trinidad and Tobago
- Incumbent
- Assumed office 22 May 2025

Personal details
- Party: United National Congress

Darrell Allahar is a Trinidad and Tobago politician. He is the Minister in the Office of the Prime Minister in the Persad-Bissessar administration.

== Career ==
Allahar is an attorney by profession.
