= Sophia Chote =

Trinidad and Tobago politician

The Honourable Sophia Chote Senator

Senator of Trinidad and Tobago
- Incumbent
- Assumed office 17 September 2025
- In office 23 September 2015 – 9 August 2020

Personal details
- Party: Independent
- Education: King's College London

Sophia Chote is a Trinidad and Tobago politician. She was appointed to the Senate in September 2025 to replace Deoroop Teemal.

== Personal life ==
In 2011, she was involved in a serious car crash in which she lost her son.
