= Charrise Seepersad =

Politician from Trinidad and Tobago

The Honourable Charrise Seepersad Senator

Member of the Senate of Trinidad and Tobago
- In office 20 November 2018 – 11 September 2023

Personal details
- Party: Independent

Charrise Seepersad is a Trinidad and Tobago politician.

== Political career ==
Seepersad first entered Parliament as an Independent Senator in 2018. She left in 2023.
