= Princes Town (parliamentary constituency) =

Trinidad and Tobago parliamentary constituency

- Constituency for the House of Representatives
- Princes Town is number 34 on this map
- Electorate: 26,473 (2015)
- Major settlements: Princes Town

Current constituency
- Created: 1961
- Number of members: 1
- Member of Parliament: Aiyna Ali (UNC)

Princes Town is a parliamentary constituency in Trinidad and Tobago.

== Geography ==
The constituency covers the town of Princes Town. It had an electorate of 26,473 as of 2015.

== Members ==
Election	Member	Party	Notes
1961	Stephen C. Maharaj	DLP	
1966	Afraz Mohammed Baksh	DLP	
1971	Lloyd Christopher Phillips	PNM	
1976	Nizam Mohammed	ULF	
1981	Amoy Mohammed	PNM	
1986	Jennifer Johnson	NAR	
1991	Mohammed Haniff	UNC	
1995	Reeza Mohammed	UNC	
2000	Subhas Panday	UNC	
2001	Subhas Panday	UNC	
2002	Subhas Panday	UNC	
2007	Seat divided into Princes Town North and Princes Town South/Tableland		
2010	Nela Khan	UNC	
2015	Barry Padarath	UNC	
2020	Barry Padarath	UNC	
2025	Aiyna Ali	UNC	

== Elections ==
2025 Trinidad and Tobago general election: Princes Town
Party	Candidate	Votes	%	±%
UNC	Aiyna Ali	11,852	75.3%	▲
PNM	Rocklyn Mohammed	2,349	15.9%	▼
PF	Sacha Mangroo	510	3.2%	Steady
Majority		9,503	59.4%	
Turnout		15,751	56.71%	
Registered electors		27,774		
UNC hold		Swing	%	
