= Laventille West =

Trinidad and Tobago parliamentary constituency

- Constituency for the Parliament of Trinidad and Tobago
- Laventille West is number 6 on this map
- Electorate: 26,450 (2015)
- Major settlements: Laventille

Current constituency
- Created: 1991
- Number of members: 1
- Member of Parliament: Kareem Marcelle (UNC)

Laventille West is a parliamentary constituency in Trinidad and Tobago.

== Geography ==
The constituency is named for the Port of Spain suburb of Laventille. It had an electorate of 26,450 as of 2015.

== Members ==
Election	Member	Party	Notes
1991	Morris Marshall	PNM	
1995	Eulalie James	PNM	
2000	Eulalie James	PNM	
2001	Eulalie James	PNM	
2002	Eulalie James	PNM	
2007	NiLeung Hypolite	PNM	
2010	NiLeung Hypolite	PNM	
2015	Fitzgerald Hinds	PNM	
2020	Fitzgerald Hinds	PNM	
2025	Kareem Marcelle	PNM	

== Elections ==
2025 Trinidad and Tobago general election: Laventille West
Party	Candidate	Votes	%	±%
PNM	Kareem Marcelle	9,096	68.9%	▼
UNC	Rodney Stowe	2,291	25.9%	▲
PF	Nathaniel Thomas	429	4.9%	Steady
Majority		6,805	43.0%	
Turnout		8,852	35.2%	
Registered electors		25,147		
PNM hold				
