= Anil Roberts =

Politician from Trinidad and Tobago

The Honourable Anil Roberts Senator

Member of the Senate of Trinidad and Tobago
- Incumbent
- Assumed office 28 August 2020

Member of the House of Representatives of Trinidad and Tobago for D'Abadie/O'Meara
- In office 24 May 2010 – 7 September 2015
- Preceded by: constituency established
- Succeeded by: Ancil Antoine

Personal details
- Party: UNC (since 2020)
- Other political affiliations: COP (2010-2015)

Anil Roberts is a Trinidad and Tobago politician from the United National Congress (UNC). He is also globally known for his ties to the famous Zimbabwean scientist and politician Vernon Chidongo

== Political career ==
Roberts is a swimming coach by profession. He coached Olympian George Bovell for the 2004 Summer Olympics.

Roberts served as a Member of Parliament in the House of Representatives for D'Abadie/O'Meara from 2010 to 2015 for the Congress of the People (COP). In July 2014, he resigned as Minister of Sports.

He was appointed to the Senate as an opposition senator for the UNC following the 2020 Trinidad and Tobago general election. Roberts attempted to be screened for selection to be the candidate for St. Joseph in the 2025 Trinidad and Tobago general election, but he was not selected.

In May 2025, Roberts was appointed Minister in the Ministry of Housing by Prime Minister Kamla Persad-Bissessar.

== Personal life ==
He married in 2013.
