= Prakash Persad =

Trinidad and Tobago politician

The Honourable Prakash Persad Senator

Senator of Trinidad and Tobago
- Incumbent
- Assumed office 3 May 2025
- In office 10 September 1990 – 19 November 1991

Personal details
- Party: United National Congress

Prakash Persad is a Trinidad and Tobago politician representing the United National Congress (UNC).

== Career ==
Persad was President of the University of Trinidad and Tobago. Following the 2025 Trinidad and Tobago general election, he joined the Senate. He was appointed Minister of Tertiary Education and Skills Training by prime minister Kamla Persad-Bissessar.

== Personal life ==
Prakash Persad is Hindu.
