= Desirée Murray =

Trinidad and Tobago parliamentarian

Desirée Murray Independent Senator

13th Republican Parliament of Trinidad and Tobago
- Incumbent
- Assumed office 23 May 2025

Personal details
- Party: Independent

Desirée Murray is a Trinidad and Tobago parliamentarian. She was appointed to the Senate in May 2025.

Murray is a physician by profession. She is a senior lecturer in Ophthalmology at the University of the West Indies.

Dr Murray was one of 33 ophthalmologists who was awarded a scholarship by the Commonwealth Eye Health Consortium, funded through the Queen Elizabeth Diamond Jubilee Trust, to study for an MSc in public health for eye care at the London School of Hygiene & Tropical Medicine.

Maiden Senate Contribution: Children's Life Fund (Amendment) Bill, 2025

During the Committee Stage of the debate on the Children's Life Fund (Amendment) Bill, 2025, due to unusual Senate deadlocks, the Senate President, Wade Mark, was called upon to break three tied votes in favour of the government. The first tied vote was on Senator Murray’s proposal to replace the word “illness” with “condition”.

Bills debated:

1.The Children’s Life Fund (Amendment) Bill, 2025

2.The Trinidad and Tobago Revenue Authority (Repeal) Bill, 2025

3.The Prime Minister’s Pension (Amendment) Bill, 2025

4.The Appropriation (Financial Year – 2026) Bill, 2025

5.The Administration of Justice (Indictable Proceedings) (Amendment) Bill, 2025

6.The Home Invasion (Self-Defence and Defence of Property) Bill, 2025

Motions debated:

1. Comprehensive National Strategic Plan for Persons with Disabilities

Committee Membership:

1.Standing Orders Committee – Senate

2.House Committee – Senate

3.The Joint Select Committee Social Services and Public Administration

During the 13th Republican Parliament, Senator Murray served as Chairman of the Joint Select Committee Social Services and Public Administration.
