= Simon de la Bastide =

Trinidad and Tobago politician

The Honourable Simon de la Bastide Senator

Senator of Trinidad and Tobago
- Incumbent
- Assumed office 23 May 2025

Personal details
- Party: Independent
- Parent: Michael de la Bastide (father)

Michael Simon Victor de la Bastide is a Trinidad and Tobago politician.

== Personal life ==
His father Michael de la Bastide was Chief Justice of Trinidad and Tobago from 1995 to 2002. He is a lawyer by profession and was appointed an independent senator after the 2025 Trinidad and Tobago general election.
