= Eli Zakour =

Trinidad and Tobago politician

The Honourable Eli Zakour Senator

Senator of Trinidad and Tobago
- Incumbent
- Assumed office 3 May 2025
- In office 15 December 2020 – 16 December 2022
- In office 11 May 2018 – 19 November 2019

Personal details
- Party: United National Congress

Eli Alfred Zakour is a Trinidad and Tobago politician representing the United National Congress (UNC).

== Career ==
He is a UNC activist. In the 2015 Trinidad and Tobago general election, he stood in Port of Spain North/Saint Ann's West against Stuart Young. In the 2020 Trinidad and Tobago general election, he stood in Diego Martin North/East against Colm Imbert.

Following the 2025 Trinidad and Tobago general election, he joined the Senate. He was appointed Minister of Transport and Civil Aviation by prime minister Kamla Persad-Bissessar.
