= La Horquetta/Talparo =

Parliamentary Constituency

- Constituency for the Parliament of Trinidad and Tobago
- Electorate: 26,031 (2015)

Current constituency
- Created: 2007
- Number of members: 1
- Member of Parliament: Phillip Watts (UNC)

La Horquetta/Talparo is a parliamentary electoral district in Trinidad and Tobago in the centre of Trinidad. It has been represented since 2020 by Foster Cummings of the People's National Movement.

== Constituency profile ==
The constituency was created prior to the 2007 Trinidad and Tobago general election, and previously largely fell within the boundaries of the Arima electoral district. It had an electorate of 26,031 as of 2015. It is considered a marginal seat. La Horquetta/Talparo includes Talparo, La Horquetta, and Wallerfield.

== Members of Parliament ==
This constituency has elected the following members of the House of Representatives of Trinidad and Tobago:

Election	Years	Member	Party	Notes
2007	5 November 2007 – 24 May 2010	Roger Joseph	PNM	
2010	24 May 2010 – 7 September 2015	Jairam Seemungal	UNC	
2015	7 September 2015 – 10 August 2020	Maxie Cuffie	PNM	
2020	10 August 2020 – 18 March 2025	Foster Cummings	PNM	
2025	3 May 2025 – Present	Phillip Watts	UNC	

== Election results ==
=== Elections in the 2020s ===
2025 Trinidad and Tobago general election: La Horquetta/Talparo
Party	Candidate	Votes	%	±%
UNC	Phillip Watts	9,585	56.5%	▲12.35
PNM	Foster Cummings	6,712	39.6%	▼15.43
PF	Rekeisha Francois	502	3.0%	Steady
NTA	Alvin Cudjoe	107	0.6%	Steady
Majority		2,873	16.9%	
Turnout		16,960	58.36%	
Registered electors		29,061		
UNC gain from PNM		Swing	13.89%	

General election 2020: La Horquetta/Talparo
Party	Candidate	Votes	%	±%
PNM	Foster Cummings	9,714	55.03	
UNC	Jearlean John	7,793	44.15	
PEP	Benet Thomas	145	0.82	
Majority		1,921	10.88	
Turnout		17,652	64.12	
PNM hold		Swing		

=== Elections in the 2010s ===
General election 2015: La Horquetta/Talparo
Party	Candidate	Votes	%	±%
PNM	Maxie Cuffie	10,428	57.50	
UNC	Jairam Seemungal	7,606	41.94	
The New Voice	Garvin Pius Powtan	101	0.56	
Majority		2,822	15.56	
Turnout		18,135	72.06	
PNM gain from UNC		Swing		

General election 2010: La Horquetta/Talparo
Party	Candidate	Votes	%	±%
UNC	Jairam Seemungal	8,712	52.85	
PNM	Nadra Nathai-Gyan	7,633	46.31	
Independent	Sookram Ali	58	0.35	
Trinidad & Tobago National Congress Party	Ramesh Maharaj	29	0.18	
Majority		1,079	6.55	
Turnout		16,483	68.80	
UNC gain from PNM		Swing		
