= Leroy Baptiste =

Trinidad and Tobago politician

The Honourable Leroy Baptiste Senator

Senator of Trinidad and Tobago
- Incumbent
- Assumed office 3 May 2025

Personal details
- Party: United National Congress

Leroy Baptiste is a Trinidad and Tobago politician representing the United National Congress (UNC).

== Career ==
Baptiste was president of the Public Service Association (PSA). Following the 2025 Trinidad and Tobago general election, he joined the Senate. He was appointed Minister of Labour and Small and Micro Enterprises by prime minister Kamla Persad-Bissessar.
