= Jennifer Raffoul =

Trinidad and Tobago businesswoman and politician

The Honourable Jennifer Raffoul

Member of the Senate
- In office 23 September 2015 – 19 November 2018

Personal details
- Born: 1984 (age 41–42)
- Party: Independent
- Education: University of Oxford

Jennifer Raffoul (born 1984) is a Trinidad and Tobago businesswoman and politician. She was a member of the Board of Governors of the University of Trinidad and Tobago.
