= Laventille East/Morvant =

Trinidad and Tobago parliamentary constituency

- Constituency for the Parliament of Trinidad and Tobago
- Laventille East/Morvant is number 7 on this map
- Electorate: 27,815 (2015)
- Major settlements: Laventille and Morvant

Current constituency
- Created: 1991
- Number of members: 1
- Member of Parliament: Christian Birchwood (PNM)

Laventille East/Morvant is a parliamentary constituency in Trinidad and Tobago.

== Geography ==
The constituency is named for the Port of Spain suburbs of Laventille and Morvant. It had an electorate of 27,815 as of 2010.

== Members ==
Election	Member	Party	Notes
1991	Kenneth Valentine Collis	PNM	
1995	Fitzgerald E. Hinds	PNM	
2000	Fitzgerald E. Hinds	PNM	
2001	Fitzgerald E. Hinds	PNM	
2002	Fitzgerald E. Hinds	PNM	
2007	Donna Cox	PNM	
2010	Donna Cox	PNM	
2015	Adrian Leonce	PNM	
2020	Adrian Leonce	PNM	
2025	Christian Birchwood	PNM	

== Elections ==
2025 Trinidad and Tobago general election: Laventille East/Morvant
Party	Candidate	Votes	%	±%
PNM	Christian Birchwood	5,837	59.7%	▼
UNC	Robert Mitchell	3,270	33.4%	▲
PF	Christopher Alexander	577	5.9%	Steady
All People's Party (Trinidad and Tobago)	Steve Stephens	75	0.8%	Steady
Majority		2,567	26.3%	
Turnout		9,781	38.77%	
Registered electors		25,231		
PNM hold				
