= Amrita Deonarine =

Politician from Trinidad and Tobago

The Honourable Amrita Deonarine Senator

Member of the Senate of Trinidad and Tobago
- In office 20 November 2018 – 11 September 2023

Personal details
- Party: Independent

Amrita Deonarine is a Trinidad and Tobago politician.

== Political career ==
Deonarine is an economist by profession. She first entered Parliament as an Independent Senator in 2018.

In 2022, she called for the creation of an ombudsman specifically to monitor the allocation of foreign exchange.
