= Claxton Bay (parliamentary constituency) =

Parliamentary Constituency

- Constituency for the Parliament of Trinidad and Tobago
- Electorate: 23,504 (2015)

Current constituency
- Created: 1956
- Number of members: 1
- Member of Parliament: Hansen Narinesingh (UNC)

Claxton Bay is a parliamentary electoral district in Trinidad and Tobago on the south-west coast of Trinidad. David Lee of the United National Congress was elected its Member of Parliament in the 2015 and 2020 Trinidad and Tobago general elections.

The constituency was renamed from Pointe-à-Pierre for the 2025 Trinidad and Tobago general election.

== Constituency profile ==
The constituency was created prior to the 1956 general election. It had an electorate of 23,504 as of 2015. It includes Claxton Bay, Marabella, Tarouba, Pointe-à-Pierre and portions of Vistabella. It is considered a marginal seat.

In 2025, the seat was renamed to refer to the town of Claxton Bay.

== Members of Parliament ==
This constituency has elected the following members of the House of Representatives of Trinidad and Tobago:

Election	Term	Member	Party	Notes
1956	24 September 1956 – 4 December 1961	Ashford Sinanan	People's Democratic Party	
1961	4 December 1961 – 7 November 1966	Peter Farquhar	DLP	
1966	7 November 1966 – 24 May 1971	Lilias Wight	DLP	
1971	24 May 1971 – 13 September 1976	Cedric Weekes	PNM	
1976	13 September 1976 – 15 December 1986	Winston Hinds	PNM	
1986	15 December 1986 – 16 December 1991	Oswald Hem Lee	NAR	
1991	16 December 1991 – 6 November 1995	Cyril Rajaram	PNM	
1995	6 November 1995 – 11 December 2000	Dhanraj Singh	UNC	
2000	11 December 2000 – 10 December 2001	William Chaitan	UNC	
2001	10 December 2001 – 5 November 2007	Gillian Lucky	UNC	
2007	5 November 2007 – 24 May 2010	Christine Kangaloo	PNM	
2010	24 May 2010 – 7 September 2015	Errol McLeod	UNC	
2015	7 September 2015 – 18 March 2025	David Lee	UNC	
Claxton Bay
2025	3 May 2025 – present	Hansen Narinesingh	UNC	

== Election results ==
=== Elections in the 2020s ===
2025 Trinidad and Tobago general election: Claxton Bay
Party	Candidate	Votes	%	±%
UNC	Hansen Narinesingh	9,969	64.5%	▲
PNM	Mukesh Ramsingh	4,934	31.9%	▼
PF	Thelston Jagoo	530	3.4%	Steady
Majority		5,035	32.6%	
Turnout		15,467	59.31%	
Registered electors		26,078		
UNC hold				

General election 2020: Pointe-à-Pierre
Party	Candidate	Votes	%	±%
UNC	David Lee	8,869	53.5	
PNM	Daniel Dookie	7,357	44.38	
MSJ	David Abdulah	208	1.25	
PEP	Marvyn Howard	144	0.87	
Majority		1,512	9.12	
Turnout		16,578	66.06	
UNC hold		Swing		

=== Elections in the 2010s ===
General election 2015: Pointe-à-Pierre
Party	Candidate	Votes	%	±%
UNC	David Lee	9,710	54.06	
PNM	Neil Mohammed	8,204	45.67	
ILP	Patrina Mark-Bascombe	48	0.27	
Majority		1,506	8.38	
Turnout		17,962	73.08	
UNC hold		Swing		
