= Oropouche East =

Trinidad and Tobago parliamentary constituency

- Constituency for the Parliament of Trinidad and Tobago
- Oropouche East is number 37 on this map
- Electorate: 27,298 (2015)
- Major settlements: Oropouche

Current constituency
- Created: 2007
- Number of members: 1
- Member of Parliament: Roodal Moonilal (UNC)

Oropouche East is a parliamentary constituency in Trinidad and Tobago.

== Geography ==
The constituency is located in the Oropouche area of Trinidad. It had an electorate of 27,298 as of 2015.

== Members ==
| Election | Member | Party | Notes |
|---|---|---|---|
| 2007 | Roodal Moonilal | UNC | |
| 2010 | Roodal Moonilal | UNC | |
| 2015 | Roodal Moonilal | UNC | |
| 2020 | Roodal Moonilal | UNC | |
| 2025 | Roodal Moonilal | UNC | |

== Elections ==
2025 Trinidad and Tobago general election: Oropouche East
| Party | Candidate | Votes | % | ±% |
|---|---|---|---|---|
| UNC | Roodal Moonilal | 13,649 | 81.5% | ▲ |
| PNM | Richard Ragbir | 2,264 | 13.5% | ▼ |
| PF | Danny Jadoonan | 771 | 4.6% | Steady |
| Majority | | 11,385 | 68.0% | |
| Turnout | | 16,742 | 59.6% | |
| Registered electors | | 28,092 | | |
| UNC hold | | Swing | % | |
