= Roodal Moonilal =

Politician from Trinidad and Tobago

The Honourable Roodal Moonilal

Minister of Housing and Urban Development of Trinidad and Tobago
- In office 24 May 2010 – 7 September 2015
- Succeeded by: Marlene McDonald

Leader of Government Business House of Representatives of Trinidad and Tobago
- In office 24 May 2010 – 7 September 2015
- Succeeded by: Camille Robinson Regis

Deputy Political Leader of the United National Congress
- Incumbent
- Assumed office 27 June 2022
- Preceded by: Lackram Bodoe
- In office 24 March 2012 – 5 December 2015
- Succeeded by: Rai Ragbir

Personal details
- Born: 2 December 1966 (age 59) Trinidad and Tobago
- Party: United National Congress
- Occupation: Lawyer; Politician

Roodal Moonilal (pronounced [roːɖɑːlə munilɑːlə]; born 2 December 1966) is a Trinidad and Tobago politician from the United National Congress (UNC). In 2025, he was appointed Minister of Energy and Energy Industries by Prime Minister Kamla Persad-Bissessar.

Moonilal has been the Member of Parliament for Oropouche East since 2010, and served as the Member of Parliament for Oropouche from 2002–2007. He previously was the Minister of Housing and Urban Development of Trinidad and Tobago and the Leader of Government Business in the House of Representatives from 2010 to 2015.

Moonilal is a founding member of the United National Congress, and he served as the first Youth Affairs Officer of the party.

== Education and early career ==
Moonilal has a Bachelor of Science degree with honours in government from the University of the West Indies (UWI), St. Augustine, an LLB degree in law from the University of London., a Master of Arts Degree in labour and development, which he graduated magna cum laude in 1991/1992, and a Ph.D. in development studies during 1995 to 1998 from the International Institute of Social Studies in The Hague, Netherlands. There he specialized in industrialization, labour relations and urban employment, and his thesis received the first cum laude distinction in the history of the Ph.D. program at the Institute of Social Studies.

Moonilal was a part-time tutor in politics at UWI (1988–91, 1993–94, 1996), and was a teaching and research assistant (TRA) at the Institute of Social Studies. (1995, 1997–98). He was also advisor to ATS/GWTU (1999), lectured part-time at UWI, (1999-2000) and was lecturer at the Institute of Social Studies, (May–June 2000). In 1999, Moonilal was director, Policy Monitoring Unit, Office of the Prime Minister.

Moonilal lectured in the areas of industrial relations and human resource management (HRM) at the UWI and worked as an industrial relations consultant in Trinidad and Tobago and the wider Caribbean.

Moonilal is married to Natasha Moonilal (formerly Chadeesingh).

== Trade union and political activist ==
Moonilal worked as Head of the Department of Education, Research and Training, All Trinidad Sugar and General Workers Trade Union (1989–91, 1993–95) and was rehired in an advisory capacity in 1999, during which time he also served as Industrial Relations Consultant and Advisor to the North West Regional Health Authority (NWRHA), Port-of-Spain (1999-2000).

== Member of Parliament and Minister of Government ==
A member of Parliament since 2001, Moonilal, was first appointed as a Government Senator and was later elected to the House of Representatives. He previously served in Government as Minister in the Ministry of Labour, Manpower Development and Industrial Relations and also as Minister of Communications and Information Technology). In 1999, Moonilal was Director, Policy Monitoring Unit, Office of the Prime Minister of Trinidad and Tobago. He has also served as chairman of the Public Accounts Committee (2007-2010) as well as on over one dozen committees of Parliament.

On 24 May 2010 Moonilal was elected as Member of Parliament in the Oropouche East Constituency and subsequently became the Minister of Housing, Planning and the Environment in the People's Partnership government. The portfolio of this Ministry has been altered several times during this administration and is now known as the Ministry of Housing and Urban Development.

== Electoral history ==
2025 Trinidad and Tobago general election: Oropouche East
Party	Candidate	Votes	%	±%
UNC	Roodal Moonilal	13,649	81.5%	▲
PNM	Richard Ragbir	2,264	13.5%	▼
PF	Danny Jadoonan	771	4.6%	Steady
Majority		11,385	68.0%	
Turnout		16,742	59.6%	
Registered electors		28,092		
UNC hold		Swing	%	
