= Fitzgerald Hinds =

Politician from Trinidad and Tobago

Fitzgerald Ethelbert Hinds
- Born: 1956 (age 69–70); Colony of Trinidad and Tobago
- Education: Queen Mary and Westfield College, University of London

Fitzgerald Ethelbert Hinds is a Trinidad and Tobago politician from the People's National Movement (PNM). He formerly served as Trinidad and Tobago Minister of National Security as well as in both houses of the Parliament of Trinidad and Tobago.

== Career ==
Hinds is an attorney-at-law by profession. He is also a former policeman. In 1976, he joined the Trinidad and Tobago Police Service.

Hinds was first elected to the Parliament of Trinidad and Tobago in the 1995 Trinidad and Tobago general election as Laventille East/Morvant MP. He served in the Opposition until 2001 when he was appointed Minister of State in the Ministry of Public Administration and Information. He later served in the Ministry of National Security and also in the Ministry of Trade and Industry.

He was not selected as a candidate for the 2007 Trinidad and Tobago general election and re-entered private life. In 2013, he was appointed to the Senate by Keith Rowley. Following the PNM victory in the 2015 Trinidad and Tobago general election, he was appointed Minister of Works and Transport, then Minister of Public Utilities, then Minister in the Ministry of the Attorney General and, then again, as Minister of Public Utilities.

In the 2020 Trinidad and Tobago general election, he was elected to the House of Representatives in Laventille West. Hinds was appointed Minister of Youth Development and National Service. By April 2021, he was appointed National Security Minister. In 2024, Hinds issued clarification relating to the law on camouflage clothing in Trinidad and Tobago. He cited that the law only restricted camouflage clothing, not accessories, that closely resembled Trinidad and Tobago Defence Force uniforms. Therefore, Hinds stated that any brightly coloured camouflage that could not cause someone to be mistaken for a member of the Defence Force would be legal.

He stood down at the 2025 Trinidad and Tobago general election. He was succeeded by Kareem Marcelle.
