= Cumuto/Manzanilla =

Trinidad and Tobago parliamentary constituency

- Constituency for the Parliament of Trinidad and Tobago
- Cumuto/Manzanilla is number 27 on this map
- Electorate: 24,700 (2007); 26,896 (2010); 28,152 (2015)
- Major settlements: Cumuto, Manzanilla

Current constituency
- Created: 2007
- Number of members: 1
- Member of Parliament: Shivanna Sam (UNC)

Cumuto/Manzanilla is a parliamentary constituency in Trinidad and Tobago.

== Geography ==
The constituency contains the towns of Cumuto and Manzanilla. It had an electorate of 28,152 as of 2015.

== Members ==
Election	Member	Party	Notes
2007	Harry Partap	UNC	
2010	Collin Partap	UNC	
2015	Christine Newallo-Hosein	UNC	
2020	Rai Ragbir	UNC	
2025	Shivanna Sam	UNC	

== Elections ==
2025 Trinidad and Tobago general election: Cumuto/Manzanilla
Party	Candidate	Votes	%	±%
UNC	Shivanna Sam	12,559	68.1%	▲
PNM	Sanjiv Boodhu	5,393	29.2%	▼
PF	Valene Teelucksingh	438	2.4%	Steady
Majority		7,166	38.9%	▲
Turnout		18,447	59.94%	
Registered electors		30,776		
UNC hold				
