= Toco/Sangre Grande =

Trinidad and Tobago parliamentary constituency

- Constituency for the Parliament of Trinidad and Tobago
- Toco/Sangre Grande is number 17 on this map
- Electorate: 30,149 (2015)

Current constituency
- Created: 2007
- Number of members: 1
- Member of Parliament: Wayne Sturge (UNC)

Toco/Sangre Grande is a parliamentary constituency in Trinidad and Tobago.

== Geography ==
The constituency name refers to the village of Toco and the Sangre Grande region in the north east of Trinidad. It was known as Toco/Manzanilla until 2007.

It had an electorate of 30,149 as of 2015.

== Members ==
Toco/Manzanilla
Election	Member	Party	Notes
1961	Lionel Robinson	PNM	
1981	Elmina Clarke-Allen	PNM	
1986	Joseph Toney	NAR	
1991	Andrew Casimire	PNM	
1995	Roger Boynes	PNM	
Toco/Sangre Grande
2007	Indra Sinanan Ojah-Maharaj	PNM	
2010	Rupert Griffith	UNC	
2015	Glenda Jennings-Smith	PNM	
2020	Roger Monroe	PNM	
2025	Wayne Sturge	UNC	

== Elections ==
2025 Trinidad and Tobago general election: Toco/Sangre Grande
Party	Candidate	Votes	%	±%
UNC	Wayne Sturge	9,728	55.0%	▲
PNM	Roger Monroe	7,363	41.6%	▼
PF	Elizabeth Wharton	385	2.2%	Steady
NTA	Christine Newallo-Hosein	143	0.8%	Steady
Majority		2,365	13.40%	
Turnout		17,691	56.73%	
Registered electors		31,186		
UNC gain from PNM		Swing	%	
