= Senate (Trinidad and Tobago) =

Upper house of the bicameral Parliament of Trinidad and Tobago

Senate of Trinidad and Tobago
- 13th Republican Parliament of Trinidad and Tobago
- Flag Coat of Arms

Type
- Type: Upper house of the Parliament of Trinidad and Tobago

Leadership
- President of the Senate: Wade Mark (Note: Mark was elected President of the Senate under the nomination of the UNC. However, the position of Senate President is officially one without political affiliation.) since 23 May 2025
- Vice President of the Senate: Kenya Charles, UNC since 23 May 2025
- Leader of Government Business in the Senate: Darrell Allahar, UNC since 23 May 2025
- Leader of Opposition Business in the Senate: Amery Browne, PNM since 23 May 2025

Structure
- Seats: 31
- Political groups: Government: United National Congress–Coalition of Interests (16); Official Opposition: People's National Movement (6); Other: Independent (9)

Elections
- Voting system: Appointment by the president on advice of the prime minister (16), at her discretion (9) and opposition leader (6)

Meeting place
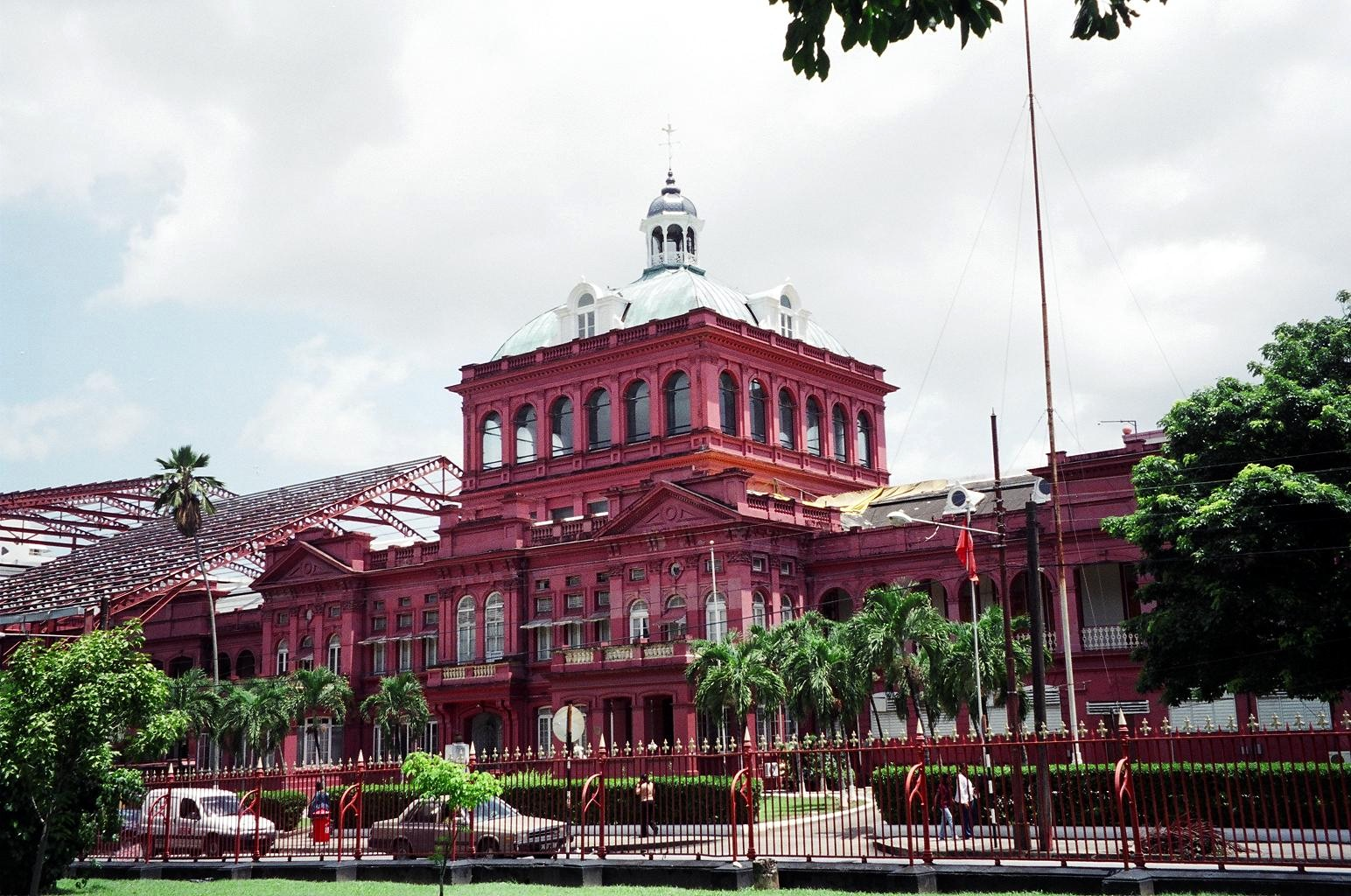
- The Red House, Abercromby Street, Downtown, Port of Spain, Trinidad and Tobago

Website
- www.ttparliament.org

Constitution
- Constitution of Trinidad and Tobago

The Senate of Trinidad and Tobago is the appointed upper house of the bicameral Parliament of Trinidad and Tobago, along with the President and House of Representatives of Trinidad and Tobago. The Senate currently sits at the Red House. The Senate has 31 members all appointed by the President: 16 Government Senators appointed on the advice of the Prime Minister, 6 Opposition Senators appointed on the advice of the Leader of the Opposition and 9 Independent Senators appointed on the discretion of the President from outstanding persons who represent other sectors of civil society. The presiding officer, the President of the Senate, is elected from among the Senators who are not Ministers or Parliamentary Secretaries. A senator must be at least 25 years old and a citizen of Trinidad and Tobago. The current President of the Senate is Senator Wade Mark. As of 20 April 2021, there are only 13 female senators, or 41.9% and 6 Tobagonian senators or 19.4%. The Senate made history on 15 February 2022 by appointing Jowelle de Souza as an acting opposition senator, thus making her the Caribbean's first and only transgender parliamentarian.

== Party affiliation ==
Affiliation	Members
People's National Movement	6
Independent	9
United National Congress	16
Total	31

== Leadership ==
=== Presiding officers ===
Office	Officer	Since
President of the Senate	Wade Mark	23 May 2025
Vice President of the Senate	Kenya Charles	23 May 2025

=== Majority leadership ===
Office	Officer	Since
Leader of Government Business in the Senate	Darrell Allahar	23 May 2025

=== Minority leadership ===
Office	Officer	Since
Leader of Opposition Business in the Senate	Amery Browne	25 May 2025

== Senators ==
=== Current senators ===
Member of Parliament	Party	Date appointed as a Senator	Office
Phillip Alexander	UNC	May 2025	Minister in the Ministry of Housing
Darrell Allahar	UNC	May 2025	Minister in the Office of the Prime Minister
Brian Baig	UNC	May 2025	
Leroy Baptiste	UNC	May 2025	Minister of Labour and Small and Micro Enterprises
Natalie Chaitan-Maharaj	UNC	May 2025	Parliamentary Secretary, Ministry of Social Development and Family Services
Kenya Charles	UNC	May 2025	Vice President of the Senate
John Jeremie	UNC	May 2025	Attorney General
Satyakama Maharaj	UNC	May 2025	Minister of Trade, Investment, and Tourism
Wade Mark	UNC	May 2025	President of the Senate
David Nakhid	UNC	May 2025	Parliamentary Secretary in the Ministry of Sport and Youth Affairs
Prakash Persad	UNC	May 2025	Minister of Tertiary Education and Skills Training
Ravi Ratiram	UNC	May 2025	Minister of Agriculture and Fisheries
Anil Roberts	UNC	May 2025	Minister in the Ministry of Housing
Dominic Smith	UNC	May 2025	Minister of Public Administration and Artificial Intelligence
Kennedy Swaratsingh	UNC	May 2025	Minister of Planning, Economic Affairs and Development
Eli Zakour	UNC	May 2025	Minister of Transport and Civil Aviation
Faris Al-Rawi	PNM	May 2025	
Amery Browne	PNM	May 2025	
Foster Cummings	PNM	May 2025	
Vishnu Dhanpaul	PNM	May 2025	
Janelle John-Bates	PNM	May 2025	
Melanie Roberts-Radgman	PNM	May 2025	
Marlene Attzs	Independent	May 2025	
Sophia Chote	Independent	May 2025	
Simon de la Bastide	Independent	May 2025	
Candice Jones-Simmons	Independent	May 2025	
Alicia Lalite-Ettienne	Independent	May 2025	
Francis Lewis	Independent	May 2025	
Courtney McNish	Independent	May 2025	
Desirée Murray	Independent	May 2025	
Anthony Vieira	Independent	May 2025	

=== Senators until 2025 ===
Member of Parliament	Party	Date appointed as a Senator	Office
Nigel de Freitas	PNM	23 September 2015	President of the Senate
Reginald Armour	PNM	16 March 2022	Attorney General and Minister of Legal Affairs
Hassell Bacchus	PNM	19 August 2020	Minister of Digital Transformation
Donna Cox	PNM	21 July 2019	Minister of Social Development and Family Services
Ancil Dennis	PNM	25 September 2024	
Paula Gopee-Scoon	PNM	11 September 2015	Minister of Trade and Industry
Lawrence Hislop	PNM	22 March 2022	
Kazim Hosein	PNM	31 October 2016	Minister of Agriculture, Land and Fisheries
Jayanti Lutchmedial	UNC	28 August 2020	
Damian Lyder	UNC	28 August 2020	
Wade Mark	UNC	23 September 2015	Leader of Opposition Business in the Senate
David Nakhid	UNC	28 August 2020	
Anil Roberts	UNC	28 August 2020	
Avinash Singh	PNM	10 December 2013	Minister in the Ministry of Agriculture, Land and Fisheries (until 2025)

=== Former senators ===
Senator	Party	Date appointed as a Senator	Date left as a Senator	Office	Ref.
Jearlean John	UNC	28 August 2020	28 April 2025		
Jennifer Jones-Kernahan	UNC	20 February 2001	1 March 2010		
Randall Mitchell	PNM	19 August 2020	28 April 2025	Minister of Tourism, Culture and the Arts	
Renuka Sagramsingh-Sooklal	PNM	19 August 2020	28 April 2025	Minister in the Office of the Attorney General and Ministry of Legal Affairs	
Rohan Sinanan	PNM	24 November 2015	28 April 2025	Minister of Works and Transport	
Amery Browne	PNM	19 August 2020	28 April 2025	Minister of Foreign and CARICOM Affairs Leader of Government Business in the Senate	
Richie Sookhai	PNM	18 January 2023	28 April 2025	Minister in the Ministry of Works and Transport	
Allyson West	PNM	29 June 2017	28 April 2025	Minister of Public Administration	
Laurel Lezama-Lee Sing	PNM	28 August 2020	25 September 2024		
Muhammad Yunus Ibrahim	PNM	11 June 2021	18 March 2025	Vice President of the Senate	
Joan Hackshaw-Marslin	PNM	28 August 2002	28 September 2007		
Paul Richards	Independent	23 September 2015	18 March 2025		
Maria Dillon-Remy	Independent	20 November 2018	18 March 2025		
Varma Deyalsingh	Independent	19 October 2018	11 September 2023		
Amrita Deonarine	Independent	28 August 2020	11 September 2023		
Hazel Thompson-Ahye	Independent	20 November 2018	18 March 2025		
Anthony Viera	Independent	2 August 2013	18 March 2025		
Evans Welch	Independent	28 August 2020	11 September 2023		
Deoroop Teemal	Independent	20 November 2018	18 March 2025		
Charrise Seepersad	Independent	20 November 2018	11 September 2023		
Jennifer Raffoul	Independent	23 September 2015	19 November 2018		

== See also ==
- President of the Senate of Trinidad and Tobago
- Parliament of Trinidad and Tobago
- House of Representatives of Trinidad and Tobago
- Elections in Trinidad and Tobago
- List of political parties in Trinidad and Tobago
- Politics of Trinidad and Tobago
- Tobago House of Assembly
