= Aripo =

Aripo may refer to:

== Trinidad and Tobago ==
- Aripo Cave, in the Northern Range
- Aripo Peak, part of the Aripo Massif in the Northern Range
- Aripo River, a river of Trinidad and Tobago
- Aripo Savannas, a part of the Aripo Savannas Prohibited Area and Environmentally Sensitive Area
- Heights of Aripo Village, a village in Trinidad and Tobago

== Other uses ==
- African Regional Intellectual Property Organization (ARIPO), an intergovernmental organization

== See also ==
- Ariporo River, a river of Colombia
- Aripov, a surname
