= National Union of Freedom Fighters =

Guerilla group from Trinidad and Tobago

- Leaders: Guy Harewood, Brian Jeffers, Andrea Jacob, Malcolm "Jai" Kernahan
- Dates active: May 1972 – November 1974
- Country: Trinidad and Tobago
- Ideology: Marxism; Maoism

The National Union of Freedom Fighters (NUFF) was an armed Marxist revolutionary group in Trinidad and Tobago. Active in the aftermath of the 1970 Black Power Revolution, the group fought a guerrilla warfare campaign to overthrow the government of Prime Minister Eric Williams following the failed Black Power uprising and an unsuccessful mutiny in the Trinidad and Tobago Regiment.

NUFF formed out of the Western United Liberation Front (WOLF), (Note: Meeks (2000), whose work is based on interviews with surviving members of NUFF, used the acronym WOLF; Cruse (2012) uses the acronym WULF.) a loose grouping of largely unemployed men in the western suburbs of Port of Spain. After the failed mutiny, members of WOLF decided to overthrow the government through armed rebellion. In 1971 they attempted to assassinate the lead prosecutor of the mutineers and a coast guard officer who helped suppress the army mutiny.

The group drew disaffected members of the National Joint Action Committee (NJAC), the country's leading Black Power organisation, and established a training camp in south Trinidad. In 1972 and 1973 NUFF attacked police posts to acquire weapons, robbed banks, and carried out an insurgent campaign against the government. With improved intelligence capabilities, the government was able to track the group and eventually killed or captured most of its leadership. Eighteen NUFF members and three policemen were killed during the insurgency.

Ideologically NUFF was anti-imperialist and anti-capitalist, and opposed both the foreign investors who controlled much of the economy and the local economic elites. They were notable for the extent to which women played an active role in the organisation, and included women among its guerrilla fighters. They were the only group to sustain a guerrilla insurgency in the modern English-speaking Caribbean over an extended period. Former members went on to play a role in the political process, while others were involved in the 1990 coup d'état attempt by the Jamaat al Muslimeen.

== Background and formation ==
Trinidad and Tobago became independent from the United Kingdom in 1962 under the leadership of Eric Williams and the People's National Movement (PNM), whose political agenda was primarily nationalist and progressive. Working class Afro–Trinidadians and Tobagonians formed the base of support for Williams and the PNM. While independence gave political power to a Black-dominated government, the economic and social power remained subject to a "white power structure". Society in Trinidad and Tobago at the time was stratified by a combination of class and skin colour that was typical in the larger islands of the English-speaking Caribbean. Traditionally, the upper class was white, the middle class coloured (mixed-race) and working-class Black. Social mobility in the nineteenth and twentieth centuries allowed Black people to move into the middle class and coloured people to move into both the upper and lower classes, but it had kept the general pyramid of social stratification intact. Whites lost their hold on political power in the run up to independence, but retained their social and economic power. Indians—who made up 40% of the country's 945,210 people in 1970—and smaller minorities lay outside this system of stratification. Education provided a means of social and economic advancement for Black people, allowing them to achieve a higher socio-economic status than less educated, but lighter-skinned people.

Independence moved Black and mixed-race people into the government and the public service, but much of the economy remained in the hands of British and North American corporations. The power that these corporations exercised over the local economy was seen by the Afro–Trinidadians and Tobagonian working class as standing in the way of the economic, social and political advancement they had expected from a PNM government. Despite this, the need for Black Power in a country within a Black-ruled region was seen as a paradox, especially in what American geographer David Lowenthal described as the "least impoverished" and best-governed Caribbean country.

In working-class communities, groups of unemployed and under-employed young men organised themselves into tight-knit groups that engaged in rioting and gang warfare. In the western Port of Spain suburb of St. James, the most militant of these groups named themselves Block Four and Block Five. In the late 1960s a loose grouping known as the Western United Liberation Front (WOLF or WULF) was organised out of Block Five. WOLF adopted the rhetoric and styles of dress of the Black Power movement. While WOLF consisted largely of unemployed young men, it also included active members of the Trinidad and Tobago Regiment.

In 1969 West Indian students at Sir George Williams University in Montreal staged a sit-in at the university's computer centre to protest discriminatory grading practices; these protests culminated in a fire and substantial property damage. The resulting arrests and trial of a group of students was a catalyst in the formation of the National Joint Action Committee (NJAC) at the St. Augustine campus of the University of the West Indies in Trinidad and Tobago. NJAC activists moved out of the university and worked to educate and mobilise the population, especially unemployed youth in Port of Spain and San Fernando. In February 1970 Black Power demonstrations broke out in the major urban centres in Trinidad and Tobago. Over the course of March and April these demonstrations gained support, especially after Basil Davis, a young NJAC activist, was killed by the police.

Despite a desire to include Indo-Trinidadians as partners, the leadership and support base of the movement remained predominantly Black. On 12 March NJAC organised a march from Port of Spain through County Caroni to try to draw the predominantly Indo-Trinidadian sugar workers into what was the movement. In response to this, sugar workers in Caroni organised a march from Couva which departed on 20 April with the goal of reaching the capital the following day. On 21 April the government declared a state of emergency and arrested the leaders of the protest movement. This triggered a mutiny by the Trinidad and Tobago Regiment. The mutineers, led by Raffique Shah and Rex Lassalle, surrendered after 10 days of negotiation and the government re-asserted control.

The collapse of the army mutiny was the impetus for the formation of the organisation that would become NUFF. According to Malcolm "Jai" Kernahan, one of the surviving leaders of the group, there was coordination between members of WOLF and Shah and Lassalle. When the mutiny occurred Brian Jeffers and other members of WOLF "took up arms" and headed into the hills above Port of Spain to connect with the mutineers who were stationed west of the city. When the mutineers surrendered, Jeffers, the de facto leader of WOLF, decided to continue with the goal of overthrowing the government through armed rebellion. Inspired by the foco theory guerrilla warfare developed by Che Guevara and French philosopher Régis Debray, Jeffers, Kernahan, and others organised a new group along revolutionary lines. Although some members of the group recommended that they focus on expanding and consolidating their support, more militant members of the leadership dominated the decision-making process.

In 1971 this as-yet unnamed revolutionary organisation shot Theodore Guerra, the chief prosecutor in the court-martial of the mutineers. Shortly after, Trinidad and Tobago Coast Guard commander David Bloom was also shot. Bloom had played an important role in the suppression of the mutiny; both men survived. The shootings gave the militants credibility among NJAC members who were disenchanted with what they perceived to be the organisation's nearly complete collapse following the arrest of its leadership. Guy Harewood and several other NJAC activists from the Port of Spain area joined the group in the aftermath of the shooting. These recruits helped the group expand its reach by making connections with other disaffected NJAC members.

In late 1971 Kernahan left the group in St. James and returned to his hometown of Fyzabad. In the oilfields of south Trinidad, with its history of militant trade unionism, Kernahan found people receptive to the idea of engaging in guerrilla insurgency. He gathered a group of activists and established a training camp in the forest.

=== Ideology ===
NUFF's leadership saw themselves as a vanguard organisation who would draw the working class into revolutionary thinking. Believing revolution to be imminent, they embraced the foco theory advanced by Debray and Guevara which suggested the idea that a small, mobile guerrilla force living off the land could trigger a popular uprising. NUFF saw itself as being the ones who could "guid[e] the arrow of history to its target". Their ideology was anti-imperialist, anti-capitalist and anti-sexist. They opposed both foreign investors and the local economic elites, and strove to overthrow the Williams administration through violence. Writing from death row where he awaited execution for the murder of Police Constable Austin Sankar, Kirkland Paul wrote "our just struggle seeks to pull down from their cradle of totalitarian power and authority that despotic ruling class".

== Guerrilla campaign ==
On 31 May 1972 Kernahan's group, newly named the National Union of Freedom Fighters, attacked an estate police station belonging to American oil company Texaco, seized six guns and over 1,000 rounds of ammunition. The following day, armed NUFF members in north Trinidad robbed the Barclays Bank branch at the St. Augustine campus of the University of the West Indies. The rough, forested terrain of the Northern Range provided safety for NUFF's approximately three dozen guerrilla fighters. Fidel Castro had compared the landscape to that of Cuba's Sierra Maestra, from which he had launched the Cuban Revolution.

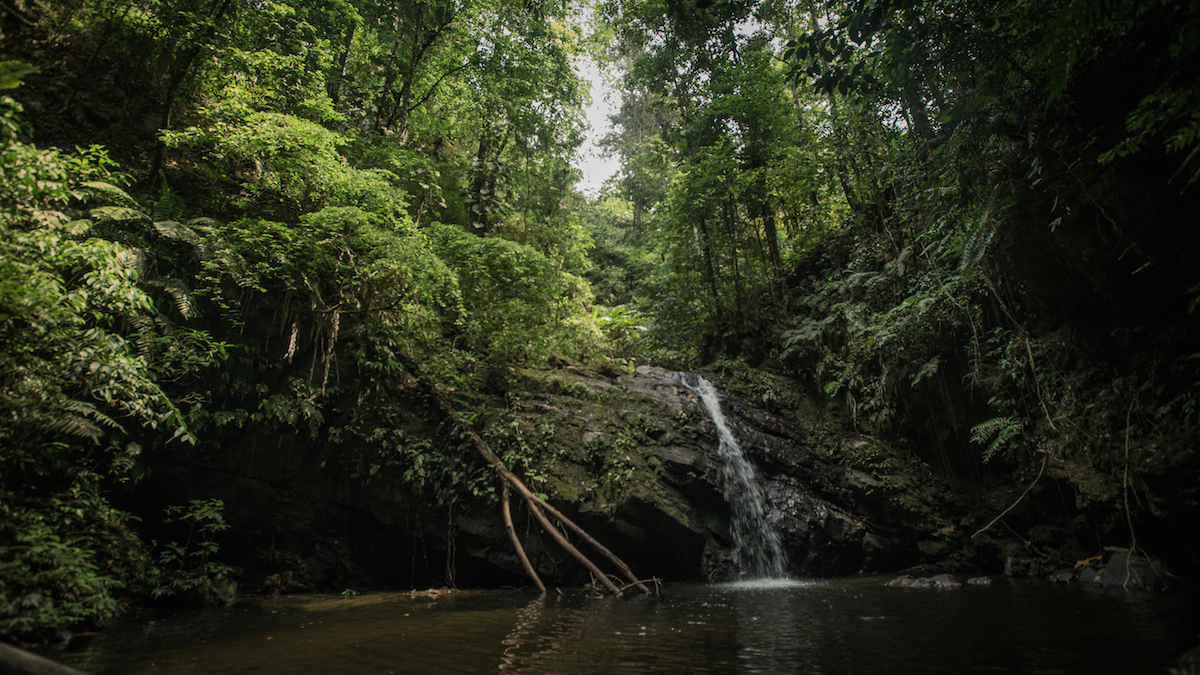
The rough, forested terrain of the Northern Range provided safety for NUFF's guerrilla fighters.

On 1 July a group of guerrillas returning from the Northern Range were intercepted at a police roadblock and a gunfight ensued. One NUFF member, Hillary Valentine, was killed and three policemen were injured. Valentine's funeral attracted 4,000 mourners. On 23 February 1973 the Barclays Bank on Tragarete Road in Port of Spain was robbed by five men and a woman—later identified as Andrea Jacob—who stole TT$100,000 (equivalent to £20,800 at the time) and a security guard's revolver.

Acting on a tip, the police, led by Assistant Superintendent Randolph Burroughs, ambushed a group of NUFF members at a safe house in Laventille later that day. Four NUFF members were killed including John Beddoe. (Note: Meeks (2000) says three people were killed, but Johnson (2015) lists four: John Beddoe, Mervyn Belgrave, Ulric Gransuall and Nathaniel Jack.) Jamaican sociologist Brian Meeks described Beddoe's death to be "a major blow to the movement as he is one of the people with genuine organizational capability and the leading advocate of the line for greater propaganda, education and consolidation".

On 1 June NUFF guerrillas used gelignite to destroy a transformer at the Textel Earth Station, Trinidad and Tobago's international satellite link, and left a message for Burroughs "that if he wanted [them] to come in the bush for [them]". Police responding to the incident were ambushed by guerrillas who injured four of them. As head of the Flying Squad, a specialised "anti-drug and anti-radical brigade", Burroughs was seen as an "icon of heroic manhood, public order and punishment" by his middle class admirers, and "public enemy number one" by Black radicals.

On 6 August insurgents attacked a Trinidad-Tesoro Oil Company police station in south Trinidad, stealing weapons and money. The following day, a group of nine attacked Matelot Police Station where one policeman was on duty, who they captured along with 13 shotguns, a pistol and ammunition. The insurgents set off explosives in the building, but released their captive unharmed. These attacks prompted a joint operation by the army and police against the rebels, and the government offered large rewards for Jeffers, Harewood and Jacob.

The offer of rewards for the capture of NUFF's leaders, coupled with the use of "increasingly repressive measures" to obtain information from suspects, allowed the police to ambush the northern group at their camp in Valencia on 28 August. Although the guerrillas all escaped with only minor injuries, the attack showed the benefits of the police's change in tactics. On 13 September 200 police and soldiers surprised the guerrillas in Caura, where they had retreated after the attack in Valencia. A NUFF sentry at the camp was killed and Jennifer Jones was captured. As the insurgents fled the attack on the camp, Kenneth Tenia and Jennifer's sister Beverly were killed by the police.

The killing of Beverly Jones and the arrest of her sister Jennifer drew an international response. Historian and political activist C. L. R. James sent a telegram to Williams "deplor[ing] the violent death of Beverley Jones and demand[ing the] immediate release of Jennifer Jones". Protests organised at the Trinidad and Tobago High Commission in London included members of the British Black Panthers, whose leader was Altheia Jones-LeCointe, the elder sister of Jennifer and Beverly.

After the attack on the camp in Caura, NUFF was left on the defensive: "police were on our heels, people were selling us out and we just running from ambush to ambush" recounted former NUFF member Terrance Thornhill, in a 1996 interview with Meeks. Guy Harewood was killed by the police in Curepe on 17 October 1973, leaving NUFF "effectively broken". Their last major activist, Clem Haynes, was captured by the police in Laventille in November 1974, marking the end of the movement. Overall, between 18 and 22 NUFF members and three policemen were killed over the course of the insurgency. (Note: Samaroo (2014) says "eighteen young persons were killed by the police", while Teelucksingh (2017) says "22 of its members were gunned down in clashes with the police".)

== Aftermath ==
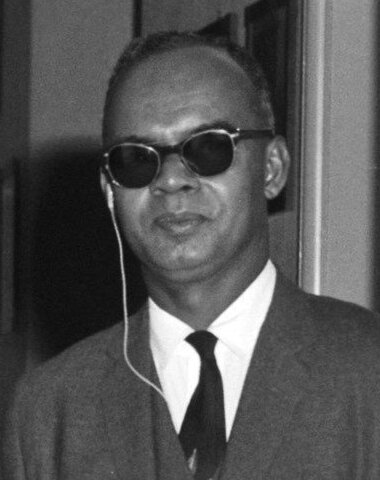
Eric Williams, Prime Minister of Trinidad and Tobago, was critical in his assessment of NUFF.

NUFF was only the second group in the modern English-speaking Caribbean to attempt a serious guerrilla uprising (the first being Henry's rebellion in Jamaica in 1960), and the only one able to create an insurgent campaign that was sustained over time. Historian and former Black Power activist Brinsley Samaroo argued that NUFF's decision to engage in an armed struggle resulted not only in the destruction of the organisation, but also prompted the government of Trinidad and Tobago to react more harshly to non-violent organisations like NJAC and to the leadership of the Oilfields Workers' Trade Union and Transport and Industrial Workers Union. Historian Jan Knippers Black has argued that NUFF never posed a large threat to Eric Williams' government.

While Williams was only mildly critical in his retrospective analysis of the Black Power movement, his assessment of NUFF was "decidedly harsh", according to Samaroo. Williams wrote:

A group of young people generally well educated (reminiscent of the unrest among affluent students in United States) are taking to the hills and forests, robbing banks, holding up paymasters, attacking isolated police stations, shooting policemen, while their well-wishers declaim against "police brutality" when a shoot-out occurs.

Williams described NUFF as lacking a clear ideology, and he attributed this largely to the fact that they lacked a foreign aggressor or colonial power to fight against. Writing in 1973 C. L. R. James described their choice to engage in a guerrilla campaign to be "premature".

Many surviving members of NUFF received lengthy prison sentences. Clem Haynes was imprisoned for eight years. Andy Thomas (later Abdullah Omowale) and Kirkland Paul (Kirklon Paul according to some sources) were sentenced to death for the murder of Police Constable Austin Sankar in 1975 and remained on death row until 1987 when they were pardoned by President Noor Hassanali. Other members of NUFF played a role in founding the United Labour Front in March 1976.

== Historiography ==
Historian and women's studies scholar W. Chris Johnson calls NUFF "the progeny of the PNM", the children and grandchildren of the people who had brought the PNM to power in the 1950s. Journalist Owen Baptiste described them as "the sons and daughters of the very population [Williams] had so lavishly praised in 1959", people who wanted to end the oppressive economic system that the PNM government had permitted to continue despite condemning it. NUFF drew its support from unemployed young people in a society where more than half the population at the time was under the age of 19, and unemployment rates were high.

NUFF grew out of the Black Power movement, but its members believed that that movement had failed to achieve its objectives. David Millette, an attorney who spent his youth with members of NUFF and later researched the movement, considered the main point of disagreement between NUFF and NJAC to be NUFF's belief that NJAC had lost its effectiveness and was "only talking" despite the levels of unemployment, continued foreign domination of the economy, and increased police brutality. Meeks, similarly, wrote that NUFF attracted people who were unhappy with NJAC's ineffectiveness after the arrest of its leadership and its transition to a cultural nationalist ideology. He argued that NUFF attracted people who were drawn to the "armed revolution was the only solution" slogan which had become popular in 1970.

American historian Victoria Pasley described NUFF as "Marxist-socialist", and said that they differed from NJAC in seeing class, not race, as the dominant problem in society. Women in NUFF fought on equal terms with men and were seen as having equal standing in the movement. Their ability or effectiveness as guerilla fighters was not questioned, and they were not expected to simply look after the men in their encampments in the forest. Beverly Jones, who was killed by the police in Caura, participated as a guerilla fighter and became a hero to supporters after her death.

Historian Matthew Quest compares NUFF's activities of "robbing banks and striking back at brutal police" to those of the Black Liberation Army in the United States. Political scientist Perry Mars described NUFF's ideology as Maoist, and spoke of their "violent and suicidal extremism". Sociologist Anthony Maingot argued that their tactics were more in line with Carlos Marighella's Minimanual of the Urban Guerrilla than with foco. According to historian Rita Pemberton and colleagues, NUFF believed that electoral systems were too flawed to produce true democracy, and that it could only be achieved through what they called "revolutionary democracy". They told their followers "you can either make it to liberation day or die trying".

== Legacy ==
Political scientists have drawn connections between NUFF's insurgency and the 1990 coup d'état attempt by the Jamaat al Muslimeen. NUFF's use of violence in challenging the Westminster system of parliamentary democracy was seen by political scientist John La Guerre as an inspiration for the Jamaat al Muslimeen. The movements also shared a connection in the person of Abdullah Omowale (formerly Andy Thomas), who was a leading figure in both the 1990 coup attempt and in NUFF's insurgency. Jennifer Jones-Kernahan (née Jones) went on to serve as a United National Congress senator, government minister and ambassador to Cuba, while her husband Jai Kernahan contested the Laventille West constituency for the People's Partnership in the 2015 Trinidad and Tobago general election.

== See also ==
- History of Trinidad and Tobago
- Trinidad and Tobago Police Service
