= Samaroo =

Samaroo, also spelled Somaroo or Samaru, is an Indo-Caribbean surname prominent in Trinidad and Tobago and Guyana. It is considered to be primarily derived from Sumeru, the sacred, five-peaked mountain representing the cosmic center in Hindu, Buddhist, and Jain cosmology. It is widely considered the axis mundi—the fixed anchor around which continents, oceans, and heavens revolve. Alternative etymological hypotheses include a derivation from the Sanskrit or Gujarati root word samar (समर), meaning "to fight" or "battle," or from Somwaar, the Caribbean Hindustani word for "Monday," reflecting a traditional practice of naming a child after their day of birth.

== Etymological hypotheses ==
Because formal demographic records from the migration era are incomplete, several distinct theories exist regarding the linguistic origin of the surname, with none considered definitive:

- Cosmological origin (Sumeru): The name may be a localized variant of Sumeru, the sacred, five-peaked mountain representing the cosmic center in Hindu, Buddhist, and Jain cosmology. In the Bhojpuri and Awadhi dialects spoken by 19th-century Indian indentured laborers, vowel mutation and phonetic shifting—such as the flattening of the initial "Su-" sound into a short "Sa-" or "So-"—were common features of regional Prakrit evolution. Under this theory, it originally existed as a prestigious religious given name meaning "excellent" or "immovable like a mountain," which was later registered as a hereditary family surname by colonial authorities in the Caribbean.
- Martial origin (Samar): Another theory traces the name to the Gujarati or Sanskrit root word samar (समर), meaning "to fight" or "battle." This suggests a linguistic connection to individuals from a traditional martial or warrior background whose given names or titles were adapted into the surname Samaroo during the registration process in the diaspora.
- Temporal origin (Somwaar): A third widely cited theory links the surname to Somwaar, the Caribbean Hindustani word for "Monday." This follows a traditional North Indian agrarian practice of naming a newborn child after the specific day of the week on which they were born.

== Geographic origins and colonial migration ==
The ancestral origins of individuals bearing the Samaroo surname are rooted within the Bhojpuri-Purvanchal macro-region of North India—encompassing modern-day western Bihar and eastern Uttar Pradesh—as well as the adjacent Terai plains of Nepal. Between 1845 and 1917, during the era of Indian indentured labor, these individuals migrated via the Port of Calcutta to fulfill labor contracts on British sugar, cocoa, and rubber plantations across the West Indies, primarily in Trinidad and Tobago and Guyana.

Because traditional family surnames were uncommon among rural North Indian agricultural classes at the time, migrants typically traveled with only a single given name (such as Somwaru or Sumeru). Over subsequent generations in the Caribbean, British colonial estate authorities and immigration clerks standardized these ancestral given names into hereditary, Western-style family surnames to streamline civil registration and plantation record-keeping.

== Caste mobility and diaspora renaming ==
Research into Indo-Caribbean migration patterns introduces a sociological layer to the name's evolution. Renowned Trinidadian historian Brinsley Samaroo extensively documented the phenomenon of "Brahmins by boat," describing how the geographic crossing of the Kala Pani effectively fractured the rigid structures of the Indian caste system.

According to this academic framework, marginalized or lower-caste indentured laborers arriving at Caribbean immigration depots frequently engaged in deliberate social rebranding to escape ancestral caste stigma. Because colonial estate clerks and ship authorities could not verify true ancestral lineages, laborers often adopted status-elevating titles (such as Maraj or Singh) or highly dignified spiritual concepts as personal given names. Within this historical context, names derived from the grand cosmological mountain Sumeru or the martial root Samar may have been intentionally claimed by immigrants seeking a clean slate, which colonial authorities later standardized into the permanent, hereditary surname Samaroo.

== Modern distribution ==
Samaroo is an exclusively diaspora surname; it is heavily concentrated in the Caribbean and is not found natively in India. It is most prevalent in Guyana and Trinidad and Tobago, where roughly 1 in every 550 people carries the name. Due to significant twentieth-century waves of Indo-Caribbean emigration, the surname has increasingly established a presence in North America and Europe. In the United States, according to the 2010 federal census, Samaroo ranks as the 18,685th most common surname, belonging to approximately 1,471 individuals. Smaller clusters of the surname are also documented across Canada and the United Kingdom, particularly within metropolitan hubs that received large populations of West Indian immigrants.

== Notable people ==
- Adesh Samaroo, Trinidad and Tobago musician
- Amanda Samaroo (born 1992), Trinidad and Tobago cricketer
- Jit Samaroo (1950–2016), Trinidad and Tobago composer and musician
- Brinsley Samaroo (1940–2023), Trinidad and Tobago historian, academic, and former Member of Parliament.
- Ashford Samaroo (born 1943), Trinidadian cricketer
- Sookval Samaroo (1912–1987), Trinidadian cricketer
