= Oluko Imo =

- Born: John Andrews; 1951; East Port of Spain, Trinidad
- Died: 2007 (aged 55–56); Trinidad
- Occupation: Singer/musician
- Spouse: Grace Imo

Oluko Imo (born John Andrews) was a Trinidadian-born musician, multi-instrumentalist, and bandleader known for blending calypso with Afrobeat and Nigerian jazz. He was born near the East Port of Spain, in Trinidad and Tobago. Imo first emerged during the Black Power movement, a period of political and social activism in the country. Influenced by these developments, he founded the Black Truth Rhythm Band. The band drew inspiration from African roots and Orisha beliefs, addressing themes related to social justice. After the band disbanded in 1978, Imo left Trinidad and Tobago to pursue a solo career. He later moved to New York City, where he met Fela Kuti, whose work had a significant influence on his musical direction. Despite his connections to Trinidadian cultural traditions, Imo remained relatively unknown in Trinidad and Tobago at the time of his death.

== Early life ==
Oluko Imo was born and raised in Laventille, a community surrounding the East Port of Spain that was a hub of cultural action. Imo was born into a musical family where he grew up listening to Bert Bailey and his Jets. Both his father and uncle were respected musicians in Trinidad.

== Career ==
Oluko Imo began his musical career as a member of the Blue Veils, a combo band that blended genres such as calypso, soca, and pop music. He initially performed as a guitarist before later transitioning to vocals and bass. The Blue Veils' repertoire consisted mostly of covers of North and Latin American songs. On February 26, 1970, a revolution broke out in Trinidad and Tobago, with thousands of trade unionists and students marching in the streets. During the revolution, Imo described the "Black Power Uprising" as an example of the transformative potential of music in political and social movements. The political unrest temporarily halted Imo's musical career. Following this period, Imo's artistic direction shifted, and his work became increasingly influenced by African cultural traditions and themes.

After the Blue Veils band disbanded in 1971, Oluko Imo founded the Black Truth Rhythm band. In the group, he performed as the lead vocalist and played several instruments, including bass, kalimba, conga, flute, and percussion. The band drew inspiration from West African traditions, specifically Nigeria. Members adopted African names and clothing, a change that coincided with John Andrews adopting the name Oluko Imo. The group released a single album, Ifetayo, a title derived from the Yoruba language meaning "love excels all". Imo's artistic outlook was influenced by the Black Power movement as well as the Orishas, spiritual beings within the Yoruba religion. Combined with his background in the Spiritual Baptist faith, these influences contributed to his view that the band should produce socially conscious music. In 1973, the band won a local music competition, which led to a recording contract with Philips and Charlie's Records. Despite incorporating Trinidadian musical elements, the Black Truth Rhythm band did not achieve widespread popularity in Trinidad and Tobago, a situation that has been attributed in part to the group's strong emphasis on African cultural themes.

After the Black Truth Rhythm Band disbanded in 1978, Oluko Imo left Trinidad and Tobago. He first traveled to Caracas, Venezuela, where he reunited with Franklin George, a member of The National Union of Freedom Fighters (NUFF). Imo later moved to New York City, where he met Fela Kuti. The meeting led to a professional collaboration that influenced Imo's musical career. Imo became the tour manager and bassist for Fela's band, Egypt 80, and later relocated to Lagos, Nigeria, to continue their work together. Through his work with Fela, Imo was exposed to Afrobeat rhythms. His own music, however, continued to incorporate Caribbean melodies and deliverance. After Fela's death in 1997, Imo traveled to several countries in West Africa. During a visit to Accra, Ghana, he met Grace, whom he married in 1999. Oluko Imo died in 2007.

== Discography ==
=== Albums ===
- Glory of Om (1995)
- Anoda Sistem (recorded 2001; released 2024)

=== Singles and EPs ===
- Aspire/Imo (1976)
- Praise-Jah (1978)
- Oduduwa (1988)
