= Cumuto =

Coordinates: 10°35′00″N 61°12′00″W

- Town
- Interactive map of Cumuto
- Country: Trinidad and Tobago
- Region: Sangre Grande

Population (2011)
  - Total: 3,626
- Time zone: UTC−4 (AST)

Cumuto is a town on the island of Trinidad in Trinidad and Tobago. It is located east of Sangre Grande and south of Arima. It lies within the Sangre Grande region.

== History ==
Between 1940 and 1956 much of Cumuto was part of the American army base known either as Fort Read or Wallerfield; the area was leased to the United States as part of the Destroyers for Bases Agreement

== Ecosystem ==
Cumuto is the site of the Aripo Savannas Scientific Reserve, an area which contains one of the last remaining areas of natural savanna in Trinidad and Tobago.

== Politics ==
Cumuto is part of the Cumuto/Manzanilla parliamentary constituency for elections to the House of Representatives, the lower house of the Parliament of Trinidad and Tobago.

== Notable residents ==
- Sam Boodram
