= Basdeo Panday =

Trinidadian politician (1933–2024)

The Honourable Basdeo Panday
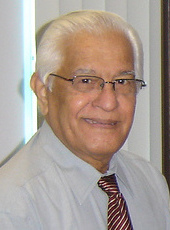
- Panday in 2008

5th Prime Minister of Trinidad and Tobago
- In office 9 November 1995 – 24 December 2001
- President: Noor Hassanali; A. N. R. Robinson
- Preceded by: Patrick Manning
- Succeeded by: Patrick Manning
Senior political offices
4th Leader of the Opposition of Trinidad and Tobago
In office 8 November 2007 – 25 February 2010
President	George Maxwell Richards
Prime Minister	Patrick Manning
Preceded by	Kamla Persad-Bissessar
Succeeded by	Kamla Persad-Bissessar
In office 17 December 2001 – 26 April 2006
President	A. N. R. Robinson; George Maxwell Richards
Prime Minister	Patrick Manning
Preceded by	Patrick Manning
Succeeded by	Kamla Persad-Bissessar
In office 10 September 1990 – 9 November 1995
President	Noor Mohamed Hassanali
Prime Minister	A. N. R. Robinson; Patrick Manning
Preceded by	Patrick Manning
Succeeded by	Patrick Manning
In office 24 September 1978 – 18 December 1986
President	Ellis Clarke
Prime Minister	Eric Williams; George Chambers
Preceded by	Raffique Shah
Succeeded by	Patrick Manning
In office 19 June 1976 – 9 August 1977
Monarch	Elizabeth II (till 1 August 1976)
President	Ellis Clarke (from 1 August 1976)
Governor-General	Ellis Clarke (till 1 August 1976)
Prime Minister	Eric Williams
Preceded by	John R. F. Richardson
Succeeded by	Raffique Shah
1st Political Leader of the United National Congress
In office 10 September 2006 – 24 January 2010
Preceded by	Winston Dookeran
Succeeded by	Kamla Persad-Bissessar
In office 16 October 1988 – 2 October 2005
Preceded by	Position established
Succeeded by	Winston Dookeran
Ministerial offices
Minister of Foreign Affairs of Trinidad and Tobago
In office 12 January 1987 – 8 February 1988
President	Noor Mohamed Hassanali
Prime Minister	A. N. R. Robinson
Preceded by	Errol Mahabir
Succeeded by	Sahadeo Basdeo
Minister of National Security of Trinidad and Tobago
In office 25 January 2001 – 24 December 2001
President	A. N. R. Robinson
Prime Minister	Basdeo Panday
Preceded by	Joseph Theodore
Succeeded by	Howard Chin Lee
Parliamentary offices
Member of Parliament for Couva North
In office 13 September 1976 – 24 May 2010
Preceded by	Constituency Created
Succeeded by	Ramona Ramdial
Member of the Senate of Trinidad and Tobago
In office 15 Sep 1972 – 19 Jun 1976

Personal details
- Born: 25 May 1933 Coonook, St. Julien, Princes Town, Trinidad and Tobago
- Died: 1 January 2024 (aged 90) Jacksonville, Florida, U.S.
- Party: United National Congress (from 1989; nominally); Patriotic Front (from 2020)
- Other political affiliations: CLUB '88 (1988–1989); National Alliance for Reconstruction (1986–1988); United Labour Front (1975–1986); Workers and Farmers Party (1965–1966); Democratic Labour Party (1957–1965; 1966–1976)
- Spouse(s): Norma Mohammed (died 1981); Oma Ramkissoon
- Children: 4, including Mickela
- Relatives: Subhas Panday (brother); Sam Boodram (brother-in-law)
- Education: University of London (BS); Inns of Court School of Law (LLB); London School of Dramatic Art
- Occupation: Politician; lawyer; actor
- Awards: Pravasi Bharatiya Samman (2005)
- Nickname: The Silver Fox

Basdeo Panday (Note: pronounced [bɑːsəd̪eːoː pɑːⁿɖeː]) (25 May 1933 – 1 January 2024) was a Trinidadian statesman, lawyer, and actor who served as the fifth Prime Minister of Trinidad and Tobago from 1995 to 2001. He was the first Indo-Trinidadian, along with being the first Hindu, to hold the office of prime minister in his country.

Panday was first elected to Parliament in 1976. He served as Leader of the Opposition four times between 1976 and 2010 and was a founding member of the United Labour Front (ULF), the National Alliance for Reconstruction (NAR), and the United National Congress (UNC). He served as leader of the ULF and UNC, and was President General of the All Trinidad Sugar and General Workers' Trade Union from 1973 to 1995.

In 2005, he was awarded the Pravasi Bharatiya Samman by the Ministry of Overseas Indian Affairs.

== Early life ==
Basdeo Panday was born on 25 May 1933, in the neighborhood of Coonook in St. Julien Village, Princes Town, Trinidad and Tobago into an Indo-Trinidadian family to Kissoondaye and Harry "Chote" Sookchand Panday. He was the oldest of five children born to his parents and, through his father, he had two elder half-sisters and one younger half-sister. His parents and grandparents were immigrants from British India who immigrated to Trinidad as indentured labourers under the Indian indenture system. His maternal grandparents, Ajodhia and Subshanti, immigrated to Trinidad via the Port of Calcutta in 1908 from Lakshmanpur, a farming village of the Azamgarh district in the Bhojpur-Purvanchal region of the present-day state of Uttar Pradesh in the Hindi Belt of North India. Panday visited his ancestral village on a state visit to India in 1997 and met with extended members of his family and donated INR₹1.5 million to help develop the village. He attended New Grant Government School and St. Julien Presbyterian School. He was later enrolled in Presentation College, San Fernando with help from his father's uncle Joseph Hardath Dube. He later worked as a sugarcane weigher at the Williamsville Estate near Princes Town for one crop season in 1951. He then worked as a primary school teacher at Seereeram Memorial Vedic School in Montrose, Chaguanas, and at St. Clement Vedic School at the St. Clement Junction in St. Madeleine. He was also a civil servant at the San Fernando Magistrate's Court where he took notes for Magistrate Churchill Johnson, Magistrate Errol Roopnarine, and Magistrate Noor Mohamed Hassanali, who would go on to be the President of Trinidad and Tobago during Panday's term as prime minister.

In 1957, Panday left Trinidad and Tobago to go to the United Kingdom to further his education. He obtained a diploma in drama from the London School of Dramatic Art in 1960 and a degree in law in 1962 from Inns of Court School of Law where he was a member of Lincoln's Inn and was subsequently called to the bar. He also received a Bachelor of Science from the University of London as an external student in 1965, majoring in economics and minoring in political science. While in the United Kingdom, Panday worked as a laborer on a building site, a clerk at the London County Council, and an electrician to support himself through university. He also appeared in several acting roles, including Nine Hours to Rama (1963), The Winston Affair (1964), and The Brigand of Kandahar (1965). In 1965, he was awarded a Commonwealth scholarship to go to the Delhi School of Economics in India to pursue a post-graduate degree in economics and political science; however, he turned down the offer and returned to Trinidad and Tobago in 1965 to practice law because of family commitments and the changing political situation in the newly independent Trinidad and Tobago.

== Political career ==
=== Early years ===
Panday's political career began in 1965, when he joined the Workers and Farmers Party and made an unsuccessful run for Parliament. In 1972, he was appointed as an opposition senator for the Democratic Labour Party. The following year he was recruited to the All Trinidad Sugar Estates and Factory Workers Union. He staged an internal coup, becoming the union's President General and under him the union expanded to workers from a variety of industries and became the All Trinidad Sugar and General Workers' Trade Union.

On 8 February 1975, amidst the backdrop of labour struggles, Panday met with fellow union leaders George Weekes and Raffique Shah. Together, they founded the United Labour Front. All three were arrested on 18 March during an attempted march from San Fernando to Port of Spain, but were found not guilty on 22 April "on the charge of leading a public march without permission".

Panday won the Couva North seat in the 1976 general election, becoming an MP and official opposition leader. The next year the party split into two factions and Panday was ousted as party leader in favour of Shah. He was reinstated in 1978 after Winston Nanan, who previously supported Shah, defected to Panday and Shah resigned.

Following a poor performance in the 1980 local elections, Panday co-founded the Trinidad and Tobago National Alliance with A. N. R. Robinson of the Democratic Action Congress and Lloyd Best of the Tapia House Group. He retained his seat in the 1981 general election.

In 1984 the National Alliance became the National Alliance for Reconstruction (NAR) and in 1985 merged with the Organisation for National Reconstruction. They won a decisive victory in 1986. Panday was named Minister of External Affairs and International Trade. The party soon fractured along racial lines; Panday accused Robinson and the government of discrimination against Indians and autocratic rule. Robinson reshuffled his cabinet in response, and Panday found himself with reduced ministerial responsibilities. The infighting continued, culminating with Panday, Kelvin Ramnath, and Trevor Sudama being expelled from the party on 8 February 1988.

=== UNC, Prime Ministership, and electoral crises ===
Panday and the other expelled ministers founded the Caucus for Love, Unity and Brotherhood (CLUB '88), which he revealed in October would become the United National Congress (UNC) on 30 April 1989. Economic decline, austerity, racial tensions and, above all, the failed but impactful 1990 coup attempt led to the NAR being swept out of power in the 1991 general election and the UNC, led by Panday, becoming official opposition.

The 1995 general election was a defining moment in Panday's career. The ruling PNM party called an early vote, expecting a victory. However, the election ended with the PNM and UNC holding 17 seats each, and the NAR holding 2. The UNC and NAR entered a coalition, thereby bringing the UNC into power and making Panday the first Hindu and Indo-Trinidadian and Tobagonian Prime Minister of Trinidad and Tobago. In 1995 Panday was charged with five counts of sexual indecency related to a harassment case brought by a former female supporter, however he was freed less than two weeks after the 1995 election in what was seen as a politically motivated charge.

Panday once again led the UNC to victory in the 2000 election, being sworn in as prime minister for a second time. In 2001, UNC MPs Ramesh Maharaj, Trevor Sudama, and Ralph Maraj alleged government corruption, pressuring Panday to appoint a Commission of Inquiry; Panday responded by firing Maharaj. Sudama and Maraj then resigned, leaving the UNC with a minority. Panday was thus forced to call a new election. The 2001 general election resulted in an unprecedented 18–18 tie between the UNC and PNM, sparking a constitutional crisis over who should form government. Both parties agreed to abide by the decision of the president, A.N.R. Robinson, as to who would lead the government, as well as to form a unity government. However, Panday reneged on the agreement when Robinson appointed PNM leader Patrick Manning, finding his explanation for doing so (Manning's "moral and spiritual values") unsatisfactory. Panday also argued that Robinson did not act in accordance with the constitution by choosing Manning, as he did not hold the majority in parliament. He refused to accept the position of Leader of the Opposition in protest.

Parliament was dissolved and new elections were called in 2002 after it was unable to elect a Speaker. This time the PNM were brought back into power with the UNC playing opposition. Panday's third term as Leader of the Opposition would last until 2006, when he was convicted of failing to declare a bank account in London.

Secret investigations into Panday began after the 2001 election, when the Central Authority and the Anti Corruption Bureau was set up by the PNM. On 18 September 2002, Panday was charged under section 27(1)(b) of the Integrity in Public Life Act No. 8 of 1987 for failing to declare the contents of a bank account in London for the years 1997, 1998 and 1999. During the investigation, he had first stated that the funds in the account were for his children's education and that his name was added to the account to prevent problems should something happen to his wife. He did not consider the funds his own, and thus did not declare them. However, after receiving further information from the bank, he stated that the account had been opened jointly with his wife to deposit money for his open heart surgery. After his wife transferred the account to another branch she maintained and administered it, and his name remained on it out of convenience. Panday blamed it on the PNM for trying to derail him weeks before the 2002 general election was to be held.

=== UNC leadership and power struggles ===
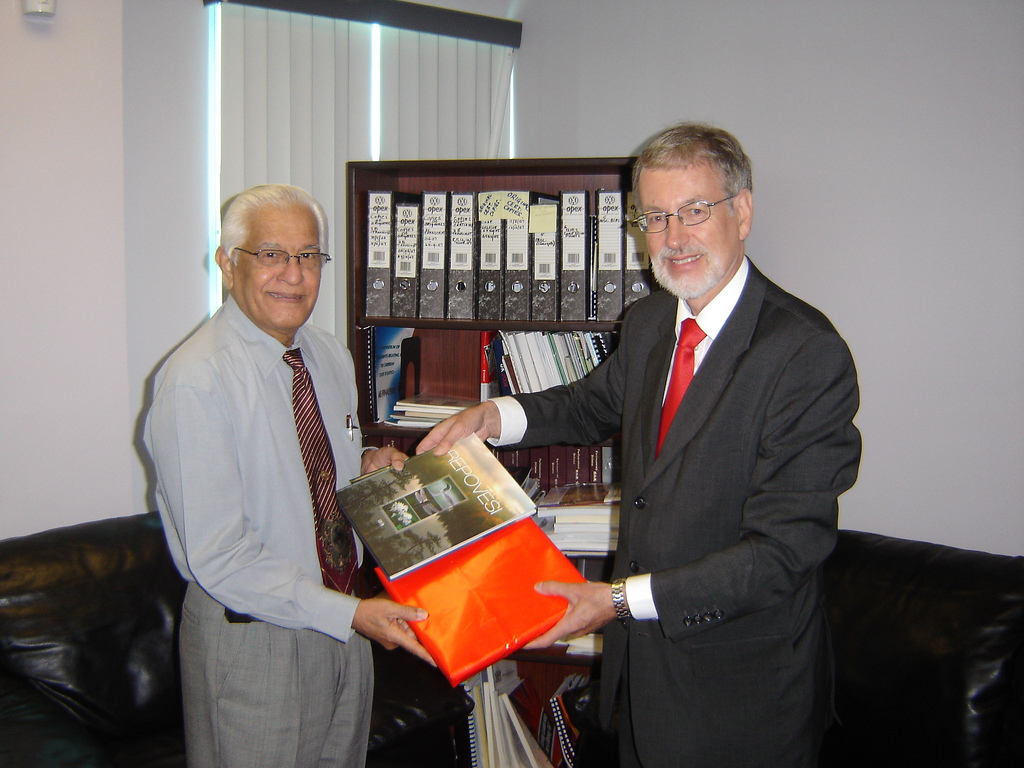
Basdeo Panday and Mikko Pyhälä Ambassador of Finland

On 31 May 2005, Panday, his wife, Oma, former UNC MP Carlos John, and businessman Ishwar Galbaransingh (chairman of Northern Construction Limited) were arrested on corruption charges. The State alleged that the Pandays had received TT$250,000 on 30 December 1998, from John and Galbaransingh in exchange for giving Northern Construction a construction contract for the Piarco Airport Development Project (PADP). Panday, Oma Panday and John were placed on TT$750,000 bail, while Galbaransingh's bail was placed at TT$1,000,000. Panday refused bail and chose to remain in prison. This was called a punitive bail both by supporters of the UNC and by former Attorney General Ramesh Maharaj, a sometimes political opponent of Panday. On 7 June 2005, bail was reduced to TT$650,000. A day later, Panday accepted bail after being jailed for over a week. Charges were later dropped in 2012.

In September 2005, during the UNC internal elections, Panday nominated Winston Dookeran as his successor as party leader. He himself retained the position of chairman. The following month, Jack Warner called for Panday to hand over the position of Leader of the Opposition to Dookeran as well. Panday failed to do so, and with the Opposition MPs split 8–8 on the issue, Panday remained as the leader of the Opposition.

In October, Panday also invited Ramesh Maharaj back into the UNC. In February 2006, Panday fired senator Robin Montano, who opposed Maharaj's return to the party. Three days later senator Roy Augustus resigned. He replaced Montano with Tim Gopeesingh, and Augustus with former Olympic athlete Ato Boldon.

On 24 April 2006, Panday was found guilty on all three counts he was charged with back in 2002, and sentenced to two years with hard labour and a TT$20,000 fine. He was also denied bail, and ordered to pay the sum in the account "for each year he was charged for not making the declaration". He appealed the decision. Following his 2006 conviction, Panday's position as Leader of the Opposition was revoked. He was replaced by Kamla Persad-Bissessar.

On 3 January 2007, Panday was reinstated as leader of the UNC. On 20 March 2007, the Court of Appeal overturned the conviction against Panday, based on the possibility that he may not have received a fair trial. A new trial under a different magistrate was ordered. The three Court of Appeal judges agreed that there was, in fact, a real possibility of bias by the Chief Magistrate in his ruling. Information that surfaced later on, linked Chief Magistrate McNicolls to a multimillion-dollar land deal and a company associated with one of the main witnesses in the Basdeo Panday trial. This information, along with the fact that Chief Magistrate McNicolls refused to give evidence for the criminal prosecution of the Chief Justice Satnarine Sharma, who he claimed tried to influence him to rule in Panday's favor, which caused that prosecution to fail, were the main arguments used by Panday's lawyers in his Appeal Court hearing.

From early 2009 Basdeo Panday was challenged for the leadership of the party by a small coalition of Opposition MPs led by the party's deputy political leader, Warner and Maharaj.

=== Political hiatus and acquittal ===
On 24 January 2010, Panday lost his bid to be elected Political Leader of the UNC once again. He suffered a defeat at the hands of new Political Leader Kamla Persad-Bissessar. He did not contest the post of chairman hence he no longer sits on the executive of the United National Congress. On 25 February 2010 President George Maxwell Richards revoked the appointment of Panday as Leader of the Opposition and replaced him with Persad-Bissessar after the majority of Opposition MPs indicated their support for her. Panday did not participate in the general elections held on 24 May 2010 and hence his term as a Member of Parliament ended.

On 26 June 2012, Panday was finally acquitted of all charges. The magistrate stated that he had not been given due process. However, in September 2012, the Director of Public Prosecutions (DPP) was given leave to challenge the decision. On 7 October 2014, the DPP withdrew the application to review the decision. The presiding Justice stated that Panday would've "face hardships and prejudice" if prosecution continued, which it did not. Also in 2012, charges for the Piarco Airport scandal were dropped.

=== Patriotic Front and return to politics ===
On 25 May 2019 (Panday's birthday), his daughter Mickela, after leaving the UNC, formed a new political party called the Patriotic Front. Panday, being estranged from the UNC, became associated with the Patriotic Front and in 2020, a year after, on his birthday and first anniversary of the party, he said he would support his daughter's party in the 2020 Trinidad and Tobago general election and he even expressed interest in returning to politics given the situation of the country and said that he could no not sit by idly and watch the country continue on its current path. In June 2020 Mickela Panday announced that her father was the campaign manager of the Patriotic Front. The party however pulled out of the 2020 general elections, saying that they had no time to mobilize themselves.

== Legacy ==
=== Impact of election ===
The election of the first Indo-Trinidadian prime minister was seen as the moment in which Indians "arrived" in Trinidad. Panday took the opportunity to correct perceived wrongs against the Indo-Trinidadian and Tobagonian community.

=== Religion and holidays ===
Shortly after beginning his first term as prime minister, Panday granted the Shouter Baptists a national holiday. His political sponsorship contributed to the legitimization of the religion in the public's eye. He also decreed that Indian Arrival Day would forever be named as such, rather than simply "Arrival Day" after 1996. He was well known for his religious pluralism and often quoted from the scriptures of the different religions in Trinidad and Tobago.

=== Music ===
Panday was the subject of several critical and racist calypsos during his first year office, such as Cro Cro's Allyuh Look for Dat and Watchman's Mr. Panday Needs His Glasses. Panday struck back in 1997 by warning of guidelines for state-sponsored competitions to prevent "taxpayers money [being] used to divide the society, whether it be on racial or any other grounds".

=== Language ===
In addition to speaking English, Panday studied Hindi and he gave speeches at the Hindi FoundationTT on the importance of the language in Trinidad and Tobago. Panday was widely associated with the Trinidadian Hindustani word neemakharam (ingrate), and popularized the term outside of the Indo-Trinidadian community. He used the word to describe his political opponents, including Winston Dookeran, Trevor Sudama, Kamla Persad-Bissessar, Ramesh Maharaj, and other rival UNC members.

=== Relationship with the press ===
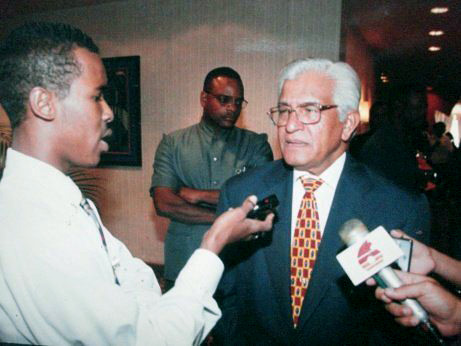
Basdeo Panday being interviewed by members of the press

Panday feuded with the media several times during his political career. In 1996 the Trinidad Guardian ran a front page featuring a photo of him with a drink and the headline "Chutney Rising". An incensed Panday ordered a boycott of the paper, refusing to allow their reporters access to government information. He accused editor-in-chief Jones P. Madiera of being a racist and called on his resignation. Ultimately, managing editor Alwin Chow, Madiera, and several other staff members left the Guardian and went on to form a new newspaper, The Independent.

Panday reiterated his dissatisfaction with the press with his refusal to sign the Declaration of Chapultepec, a 1994 document affirming freedom of the press. In 1998 he stated he would not endorse the declaration "until it repudiated the "untrammelled right of the press to publish anything it wants"".

== Personal life ==
Basdeo Panday was married to Oma Panday (née Ramkissoon). He had four daughters: Niala, Mickela, Nicola, and Vastala. Niala was born to his first wife Norma Panday (née Mohammed), who died in 1981. His brother was fellow attorney and politician Subhas Panday. Panday served as the Chief Administrator of the Basdeo Panday Foundation, a charitable organization. In November 2019, Panday was bestowed an honorary Doctor of Laws degree from the University of Trinidad and Tobago. His religion was Hinduism. His brother-in-law was the late Indian classical- and chutney-singer Sam Boodram who was married to Panday's sister Cynthia Panday. The Indian classical singer Dev Bansraj Ramkissoon was also his brother-in-law and the singer and musician Sonny Ramkissoon was his father-in-law (his wife's brother and father, respectively). Panday had a dog named Norman who was a stray that he took in. During the COVID-19 pandemic videos that Panday's daughter, Mickela, posted of him gardening and playing with his dog Norman went viral on social media and he was lauded by the news as setting an example by following the mandate to stay home to help combat the spread of the virus.

== Death ==
Basdeo Panday died on 1 January 2024 in Jacksonville, Florida at the age of 90 surrounded by his family after being hospitalized for a few weeks. His death was announced on social media by his daughter Mickela. According to his brother Subhas, his cause of death was pneumonia. His last wish was for a piece of land that he inherited from his grandmother in his hometown of St. Julien to be developed into a home for battered women and orphans. His body was flown back to Trinidad and Tobago for a state funeral. His body lied in state at the rotunda of the Red House from 5 January. Several government official and dignitaries paid their tribute. His final rites were done per Hindu customs; it was the first Hindu state funeral in Trinidad and Tobago. On 9 January his funeral procession took place. Attendees included president Christine Kangaloo, prime minister Keith Rowley, Chief Justice Ivor Archie, and opposition leader Kamla Persad-Bissessar. His brother-in-law and Indian classical singer Dev Bansraj Ramkissoon, Rana Mohip, and soca artiste Kees Dieffenthaller sang at his funeral. The cremation took place at the Shore of Peace Cremation Site at Mosquito Creek, South Oropouche.

Numerous memorial services were held for him across the country by various institutions and people such as his alma mater Presentation College, San Fernando, the Sanatan Dharma Maha Sabha, and Roodal Moonilal who, due to Panday's love for Indian classical music, held an Indian classical singing concert in Debe in honor of Panday with tributes from numerous artistes such as Rakesh Yankaran, Dubraj Persad, and Rooplal Girdharie. In light of his death, the Sanatan Dharma Maha Sabha renamed the Shiva Boys' SDMS Hindu College as the Shri Basdeo Panday Shiva Boys' SDMS Hindu College, to honor the nation's first Hindu prime minister. Former member of Parliament and government minister Vasant Bharath started a petition calling on the government to rename the Piarco International Airport after Panday, in light of all he did towards its development.

== Awards and honours ==
  (India)
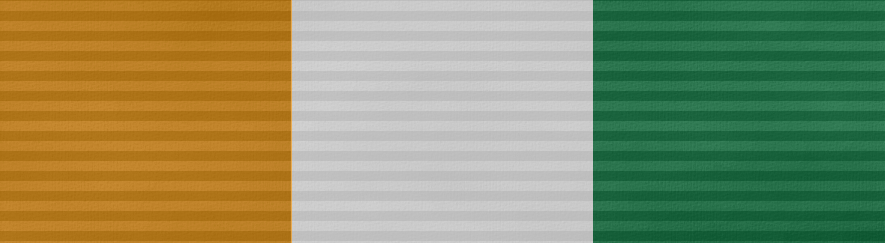
  - Pravasi Bharatiya Samman

== Filmography and stage credits ==
=== Film ===
Year	Title	Role	Notes
1963	Nine Hours to Rama	Laudryman	Cameo
1964	The Winston Affair	Indian Correspondent	Cameo
1965	The Brigand of Kandahar		Cameo

=== Television ===
Year	Title	Role	Notes
1959	The Moonstone	2nd Brahmin Priest	1 Episode
1962	Saki	Abrim	1 Episode
1963	ITV Playhouse	Indian Guest	1 Episode

=== Theatre ===
Year	Title
1961	The Bird of Time

== See also ==
- Indo-Caribbean
- British Indo-Caribbean people
- Pravasi Bharatiya Divas
- Trinidadian and Tobagonian British
- Trinidadians
- List of Trinidadians
- List of Indo-Trinidadians and Tobagonians

== Notes ==
Preceded by Patrick Manning	Prime Minister of Trinidad and Tobago in 1995–2001	Succeeded by Patrick Manning
Preceded by Roy Richardson	Leader of the Opposition of Trinidad and Tobago; 1976–1977	Succeeded by Raffique Shah
Preceded by Raffique Shah	Leader of the Opposition of Trinidad and Tobago; 1978–1986	Succeeded by Patrick Manning
Preceded by Patrick Manning	Leader of the Opposition of Trinidad and Tobago; 1991–1995	Succeeded by Patrick Manning
Preceded by Patrick Manning	Leader of the Opposition of Trinidad and Tobago; 2001–2006	Succeeded by Kamla Persad-Bissessar
Preceded by Kamla Persad-Bissessar	Leader of the Opposition of Trinidad and Tobago; 2007–2010	Succeeded by Kamla Persad-Bissessar
Preceded by Non-existent	Political Leader of the United National Congress; 1989–2005	Succeeded by Winston Dookeran
Preceded by Winston Dookeran	Political Leader of the United National Congress; 2006–2010	Succeeded by Kamla Persad-Bissessar
