= Sixth Form Government Secondary School =

Secondary school in Trinidad and Tobago

Coordinates: 10.6691°N 61.5356°W

Information
- Website: www.sixthformgovernment.org

Sixth Form Government is a government secondary school offering advanced level studies, situated on Ethel Street, Saint James, Trinidad and Tobago. At night, the same buildings function as the Polytechnic Institute, a night school for adult education.

== Notable alumni ==
- Dr. Deo Singh, ophthalmologist
- Senator Jennifer Jones-Kernahan
- Dr. Bridgette Budhlall, professor

== See also ==
- List of schools in Trinidad and Tobago
