= Ministry of National Security (Trinidad and Tobago) =

Ministry of National Security (Trinidad And Tobago)
- The "Coat of Arms" is used as the Ministry's seal.

Government Ministry overview
- Preceding Government Ministry: Ministry of Home Affairs
- Dissolved: 2025
- Superseding agencies: Ministry of Defence; Ministry of Homeland Security; Ministry of Justice
- Type: Government Ministry
- Jurisdiction: Republic of Trinidad and Tobago
- Headquarters: Temple Court, 52–60 Abercromby Street, Port of Spain.
- Motto: To be at the pinnacle of public safety and security delivery.
- Employees: 24,909
- Annual budget: $6.113 billion TTD (2025)
- Cabinet Minister responsible: Hon Marvin Gonzales MP, Minister of National Security
- Deputy Minister responsible: Hon Keith Scotland SC MP, Minister in the Ministry of National Security
- Government Ministry executives: Natasha Barrow, Permanent Secretary; Nataki Atiba-Dilchan, Permanent Secretary
- Child agencies: Trinidad and Tobago Defence Force (TTDF); Trinidad and Tobago Police Service (TTPS); Trinidad and Tobago Fire Service (TTFS); Trinidad and Tobago Prison Service (TTPrS); Trinidad and Tobago Cadet Force (TTCF); Immigration Division; Office of Disaster Preparedness and Management (ODPM); Strategic Services Agency (SSA); Trinidad and Tobago Forensic Science Centre (TTFSC); Counter Trafficking Unit; National Drug Council
- Website: https://nationalsecurity.gov.tt

The Ministry of National Security of Trinidad and Tobago was the primary governmental ministry entrusted with the safeguarding of the nation's security and the well-being of its citizens. Its mandate encompassed a wide spectrum of responsibilities, including the maintenance of law and order, ensuring public safety, national defense, the management of disaster preparedness and relief, immigration policy and regulation, passport administration, border patrol, youth development and monitoring of private security companies. Its stated mission was "to advance national development by creating a safer and more secure society through enhanced collaboration among all stakeholders, intelligence-based decision-making, and strengthened inter-agency structures and systems." The ministry's mission was accomplished through a variety of law-enforcement and protective service agencies, and internal departments and special units, which fall under its mandate.

The Ministry of National Security also engaged in collaborations with various domestic government bodies, law enforcement agencies, and international partners in addressing national security issues. Some of these were Ministry of the Attorney General and Legal Affairs, the U.S. Drug Enforcement Administration (DEA), Interpol and CARICOM IMPACS. Trinidad and Tobago maintains strong partnerships with other countries, for example Joint Combined Exchange Training exercises conducted with the U.S. Southern Command, collaboration with the European Union's Cocaine Route Programme Seaport Co-operation (SEACOP) project and the Visit Board Search and Seizure (VBSS) Training Programme a joint project between the Trinidad and Tobago Coast Guard (TTCG), the Canadian Coast Guard and the United Nations Office on Drugs and Crime.

The political head was the Minister of National Security, a position last held by Marvin Gonzales MP. The Minister was supported by two Permanent Secretaries, one of whom served as the Accounting Officer for the majority of the Ministry's operations, and three Deputy Permanent Secretaries. The Permanent Secretary was responsible for the overall administration and financial management of the Ministry, excluding the Trinidad and Tobago Police Service (TTPS). The TTPS operates with a degree of autonomy in its financial matters, with its own Commissioner of Police serving as the Accounting Officer for the TTPS. Deputy Commissioner of Police (DCP) Junior Benjamin holding the office in an acting capacity was the last Commissioner of Police under the Ministry of National Security. Furthermore, the Ministry also had a Minister in the Ministry of National Security, a position that was held by the Honourable Keith Scotland S.C. M.P.

Four former Chief of Defence Staff of the Trinidad and Tobago Defence Force (TTDF) have served as Minister of National Security in the past, Major General (Ret’d) Edmund Dillon September 2015 to August 2018; Brigadier General (Ret’d) Carl Alfonso, February 2015 to September 2015; Brigadier General (Ret’d) John Sandy, May 2010 to June 2012; and Brigadier General (Ret’d) Joseph Theodore, December 1995 to December 2000.

In 2025 the government under UNC Prime Minister Kamla Persad-Bissessar, split the Minister of National Security into three ministries, the Ministry of Defence, the Ministry of Homeland Security and the Ministry of Justice.

== History ==
The Ministry of National Security was initially established as the Ministry of Home Affairs. This early iteration of the Ministry was tasked with overseeing services such as the Police Service, Social Services, the Immigration Service, District Administration Services, the Cadet Corps Movement, and the Government Printery.

A shift in the Ministry's responsibilities occurred in 1961. The Ministry of Home Affairs focused more on the maintenance of law and order and gained the responsibility for the issuance of Marriage Licenses and Missionary Permits. Social Services, District Administration Services, and the Government Printery were no longer its responsibility.

In 1962, with the Independence of Trinidad and Tobago the ministry gain new agencies under its mandate. Which was oversight of the Defence Force, which at the time consisted of the Regiment and the Coast Guard, as well as the Trinidad and Tobago Fire Service.

In 1970 the ministry was renamed the Ministry of National Security.

In 2010 and 2012, respectively, the Trinidad and Tobago Forensic Science Centre and the Trinidad and Tobago Prison Service were moved to the Ministry of Justice. In 2015 they were returned to the Ministry of National Security.

In 2025 under the UNC government two Ministers were given responsibility for National Security, Minister of Homeland Security and Minister of Defense. In a Standing Finance Committee (SFC) sitting in Parliament on the June 16, according to Newsday, the Minister of Homeland Security announced that the Ministry of National Security will be officially rebranded and restructured as the Ministry of Homeland Security and Ministry of Defence. According to information published in the Trinidad And Tobago Gazette (Extraordinary) Vol. 64 No. 81 23 May 2025, the Ministry of Homeland Security kept most national security agencies and functions with responsibility for the Trinidad and Tobago Prison Service being shared with the Ministry of Justice, who also gained the Trinidad and Tobago Forensic Science Centre from the Ministry of National Security. The Ministry of Defence gained the Trinidad and Tobago Defence Force and the Trinidad and Tobago Cadet Force. In October 2025 responsibility for the prison system was removed from the Ministry of Justice.

== Organizational Structure ==
According to the UPDATED PUBLIC STATEMENT OF THE MINISTRY OF NATIONAL SECURITY 2024 the Ministry of National Security had twenty-four thousand, nine hundred and nine (24,909) full-time and part-time uniform positions; one thousand, eight hundred and twenty-nine (1,829) permanent civilian and one thousand, six hundred and ninety-two (1,692) contract civilian positions. The Ministry also had ten (10) main Divisions/ Agencies:

1. General Administration Division (GA): administrative support division for the Ministry
2. Trinidad and Tobago Defence Force (TTDF): responsible for national defense and border patrol
3. Trinidad and Tobago Police Service (TTPS): primary law enforcement agency
4. Trinidad and Tobago Fire Service (TTFS): primary emergency, rescue and disaster response agency
5. Trinidad and Tobago Prison Service (TTPrS): responsible for the management and operation of correctional facilities
6. Trinidad and Tobago Cadet Force (TTCF): youth development organization
7. Immigration Division: responsible for the administration and enforcement of immigration, passports, and citizenship
8. Office of Disaster Preparedness and Management: lead agency for coordinating national disaster preparedness and response
9. Trinidad and Tobago Forensic Science Centre (TTFSC): forensic science services to law enforcement and the justice system
10. Strategic Services Agency: gather and analyze intelligence related to serious crime, including drug trafficking, organized crime, and threats to national security.

.The Ministry also oversees several "Special Units" some of which are

- Counter Trafficking Unit: anti-human trafficking unit
- Electronic Monitoring Unit: manages the electronic monitoring of individuals as part of the justice system
- National Drug Council: coordinates national efforts to address drug-related issues, including prevention, treatment, and control
- Probations Services: provides probation, rehabilitation and reintegration services to the justice system

== Statutory Boards and Committees ==
The Ministry of National Security had several Statutory Boards under its mandate, together with some committees which dealt with state and agency matters for which it had responsibility.

=== Committees ===
- Advisory Committee on the Power of Pardon (Mercy Committee)
- Cadet Force Advisory Committee
- National Emblems Committee
- Protective Services Compensation Committee
- Work Permit Advisory Committee

=== Statutory Boards ===
- Criminal Injuries Compensation Board
- Defence Force Commission Board
- Defence Council
- Firearms Appeal Board

== Budget ==
The Ministry of National Security financial allocations were distributed through the national budget. The Ministry had two accounting officers a Permanent Secretary who was responsible for the ministry and the various divisions and agencies under it, and the Commissioner of Police who was and still is responsible for the Police service.

The TTPS's total allocation of the National Budget for the period 2019 to 2025 ^{(1)}
Year	Total Allocation	National Budget	Percentage of National Budget	Notes
2019	$2,173,353,390.00	$54,581,467,181.00	4.0%	
2020	$2,374,165,652.00	$57,388,076,726.00	4.1%	
2021	$2,266,370,861.00	$56,498,472,820.00	4.0%	
2022	$2,367,769,319.00	$58,974,346,470.00	4.0%	
2023	$2,378,430,716.00	$69,379,928,103.00	3.4%	
2024	$2,657,933,900.00	$64,467,985,780.00	4.1%	2
2025	$2,598,277,200.00	$63,530,583,090.00	4.1%	2

Note 1: Information from page 16 of a summary of expenditure for the Trinidad and Tobago Police Service (TTPS) for the period 2019–2025 By the FINANCIAL SCRUTINY UNIT of Office of the Parliament of Trinidad and Tobago.

Note 2: Sub note on page 16 in TTPS summary "For the Fiscal Years 2019–2023, actual figures were used to calculate the total allocation. However, estimates were used to calculate the total allocation for the Fiscal Years 2024 and 2025."

The Ministry's total allocation of the National Budget for the period 2019 to 2025
Year	Total Allocation	National Budget	Percentage of National Budget	Notes
2019	$3,259,420,836.00	$54,581,467,181.00	5.6%	
2020	$3,407,898,611.00	$57,388,076,726.00	6.5%	
2021	$2,969,343,594.00	$56,498,472,820.00	5.3%	
2022	$3,189,901,265.00	$58,974,346,470.00	5.4%	
2023	$3,406,203,952.00	$69,379,928,103.00	4.9%	
2024	$3,479,918,750.00	$64,467,985,780.00	5.4%	4
2025	$3,394,555,000.00	$63,530,583,090.00	5.3%	4

Note 3: Information from page 30 of a summary of expenditure for the Ministry of National Security (MNS) for the period 2019–2025 By the FINANCIAL SCRUTINY UNIT of Office of the Parliament of Trinidad and Tobago.

Note 4: Quote on page 30 in MNS summary "For the Fiscal Years 2019–2023, actual figures were used to calculate the total allocation. However, estimates were used to calculate the total allocation for the Fiscal Years 2024 and 2025."

Note 5: Quote on page 9 in MNS summary "Unlike other Divisions under the Ministry of National Security, the TTPS has its own expenditure Head in the Budget and therefore will not be addressed in this guide."

== Disaster Management and Response ==
Trinidad and Tobago is in a region prone to several types of natural disasters, mainly earthquakes, hurricanes and flooding, and also manmade disasters for example oil spills. The Ministry of National Security had several agencies whose responsibility was to manage these events.

Trinidad and Tobago Fire Service is the primary emergency response agency and is responsible for all fire related incidents, fire prevention, enforcement of fire safety regulations and rescue operations.

The Office of Disaster Preparedness and Management (ODPM) is the strategic disaster management coordinating agency as they plan, prepare, coordinate, and manage disaster response for the whole of Trinidad and Tobago. The ODPM is also the agency responsible for coordinating Trinidad and Tobago's response to regional disasters.

Trinidad and Tobago Regiment (TTR) engineer battalion provides engineering support, humanitarian assistance and disaster relief to municipal and national authorities. It has also deployed to assist in hurricane recovery operations in regional countries

Trinidad and Tobago Coast Guard (TTCG) is responsible for safeguarding the nation's territorial waters and maritime interests. Its core functions encompass maritime law enforcement, search and rescue operations, environmental protection, and the defense of the country's maritime borders while also providing humanitarian assistance during natural disasters and emergencies.

== Youth Development ==
The Ministry of National Security participated in various youth development initiatives, either through direct support or through the agencies under its mandate.

The Trinidad and Tobago Cadet Force (TTCF) is a youth development organisation for individuals in the secondary school system.The Cadet Force, except for a two-year hiatus during the COVID pandemic, has been in existence for over a hundred years. It started in two secondary secondary schools on May 1, 1910, at Queen's Royal College and St Mary's College, and at the time was called the Cadet Corp. According to the Ministry's website "The main objective of the Cadet Force is to train and inspire young men and women to be model citizens." The Trinidad Guardian newspaper in September 2024 quoted TTCF Sub Lieutenant Dave Elliot on the TTCF structure and Its training program where he says “The Trinidad and Tobago Cadet Force has sub-sections which include the Naval Section, Air Guard, Medics Messing and Infantry.” and, "cadets’ training is patterned after basic military practice and discipline, placing emphasis on drills, field craft such as hiking and camping, weapons training, skill at arms and map reading."

The Civilian Conservation Corps (CCC) is a youth development organisation for individuals in the age range 18 to 25 who are unemployed or socially marginalised. It was established on 14th June, 1993 to be administered by the Trinidad and Tobago Defence Force under the Ministry of National Security. its concept was based on the Civilian Conservation Corps by US President Franklin D. Roosevelt. The programme was discontinued in 1999 but reactivated in 2002. In 2020 the CCC was moved from the Ministry of National Security and put under the Ministry of Youth Development and National Service, but the programme is still administered by members of the Defence Force. In 2025 under the new UNC administration the CCC was put under the Ministry of Defense.

== International Collaborations ==
The Ministry of National Security engaged with various international bodies in addressing national security issues. In November 2024, it was reported in the press that the Ministry and the US Drug Enforcement Administration signed a memorandum of understanding (MoU) for the establishing of a vetted unit in the TTPS to work with US security agencies. Also in November 2024, it was reported that the United Nations Office on Drugs and Crime (UNODC) gave two drones to the TTDF. The Chief of Defence Staff Air Vice Marshal Darryl Daniel is mentioned as saying that the drones "are equipped with high-resolution cameras and thermal imaging capabilities."

== Ministry of Homeland Security ==
The Ministry of Homeland Security is the succeeding government department that kept the majority of the national security functions of the former Ministry of National Security. The Ministry of Homeland Security shares responsibility for the Strategic Service Agency with the Office of the Attorney General, with Homeland Security having operational oversight and the Attorney General having administrative oversight. The Current Minister is Roger Alexander appointed on 3 May 2025.

The Minister of Homeland Security has responsibility for the following departments:

- Intelligence
- Internal Security
- Citizenship
- Counter Trafficking
- Cyber-security
- Drug Trafficking and Money Laundering
- Drug Enforcement/Interdiction
- Immigration
- National Emergency/Disaster Management
- Office of Disaster Preparedness and Management
- Public Order: Safety and Law Enforcement
- Trinidad and Tobago Prison Service (TTPRS)
- Prison System –
  - Parole and Prisoner Management
  - Prison Service Reform
  - Community Service
  - Rehabilitation
- Police Service
- Supplemental Police
- Estate Police
- Special Reserve Police
- Fire Service
- Security of Government Officials and Premises
- Work Permits
- Trinidad and Tobago Cyber Security Incident Response Team (TTCSIRT)

Committees:

- National Emblems Committee
- Protective Services Compensation Committee
- Work permit advisory committee
- Witness Protection, Care and Support

Statutory Boards and Other Bodies:

- Strategic Services Agency
  - Budget Administration
  - Reporting
  - Firearms Appeal Board
  - National Operation Centre

=== Budget ===
For the Fiscal 2026 Budget, the Ministry of Homeland Security was allocated an estimated expenditure of TTD$1,864,011,700. Separately, the Draft Estimates of Expenditure outlined key financial allocations under 'public order and safety,' including TTD$3,461,944,400 for Police and Protection Services, TTD$760,283,500 for Prisons, and TTD$2,612,301,000 for TTPS salaries and other costs.

== Ministry of Defence ==
The Ministry of Defence is the succeeding government department that has inherited the responsibility for border defence and military affairs of the former Ministry of National Security. It shares partial responsibility for immigration affairs with the Ministry of Homeland Security, being responsible for the management of illegal immigrants and deportees. The current minister is Wayne Sturge appointed on 3 May 2025.

The Minister of Defence has responsibility for the following departments:

- Airspace and Territorial Waters
- Counter Terrorism
- Cadet Force
- Lifeguard
- Defence Force
  - Regiment
  - Coast Guard
  - Air Guard
  - Defence Force Reserves
- Global Security Issues
- Management of Illegal Immigrants and Deportees
- Regional Security Coordination
- Defence Force Commission Board
- Defence Council
- Military-led Academic Training Programme
- Military-Led Programmes of Apprenticeship and Reorientation Training
- Civilian Conservation Corps

Committees:

- Cadet Force Advisory Committee

=== Budget ===
For the Fiscal 2026 Budget, the Ministry of Defence was allocated an estimated expenditure of TTD$1,317,729,070. Separately, in the Draft Estimates of Expenditure under public order and safety, Military Defence's estimate was TTD$1,164,355,100.

== See also ==
- Ministry of National Security (Jamaica)
- Ministry of National Security (The Bahamas)
- Ministry of National Security (Grenada)
- Ministry of Finance (Trinidad and Tobago)
- Trinidad and Tobago passports
