= Subhas Panday =

Trinidadian politician

The Honourable Subhas Panday MP

Member of Parliament for Princes Town
- In office 2007–2010
- Preceded by: Reeza Mohammed
- Succeeded by: seat abolished

Member of Parliament for Naparima
- In office 1991–1995
- Preceded by: Raymond Palackdharrysingh
- Succeeded by: Ralph Maraj

Personal details
- Party: UNC
- Relatives: Basdeo Panday (brother); Mickela Panday (niece); Sam Boodram (brother-in-law)

Subhas Panday is a Trinidad and Tobago politician.

== Personal life ==
His brother was former prime minister Basdeo Panday.
