= Sam Boodram =

Indo-Trinidadian singer

Ustad Mahant Sam Boodram
- Born: Samdeo Boodram; 14 July 1933; El Dorado, Trinidad and Tobago
- Died: 30 June 2020 (aged 86); Cumuto, Sangre Grande, Trinidad and Tobago
- Other names: D' Cumuto Lion; Uncle Sam
- Occupations: Singer, musician, farmer, mahant
- Spouse: Cynthia Panday (m. 1957)
- Relatives: Basdeo Panday (brother-in-law); Subhas Panday (brother-in-law); Mickela Panday (niece)
- Musical career
- Origin: East–West Corridor, Trinidad and Tobago
- Genres: Chutney, Indian classical music, Indian folk music, bhajan
- Instruments: Vocals, Harmonium
- Years active: 1945–2020
- Label: Praimsingh

Samdeo "Sam" Boodram (14 July 1933 – 30 June 2020) was a Trinidadian Chutney, Bhajan, Indian classical and folk singer, Kabir Panthi mahant, and cocoa farmer. He recorded over 6,000 songs over the span of his career.

== Early life ==
Sam Boodram was born into a Hindu Indian family to Boodram Balroop and Babonie Boodram in El Dorado, Trinidad and Tobago, on 14 July 1933. His family later moved from El Dorado to Aranguez in San Juan, Trinidad and Tobago. He attended the Bal Maharaj Hindu School where he learned Hindustani and was introduced to Indian singing as part of a program sponsored by Chanka Maharaj, a prominent politician and landowner. When Boodram was ten years old his family moved to Cumuto. Also, at the age of ten, he won a singing competition at his school singing the song "Puchhe Bhaiya Bharat Ram Kaha Mai". After winning that competition, Boodram said his interest in singing and music began. He later met the Indian classical singer, Ramcharitar, who became his guru. He also learned from singers such as Pt. Ramkissoon Maharaj, Benny Sewnath, Bel Bagai, and Hardeo.

== Career ==
Sam Boodram was a cocoa farmer in Cumuto. He used to have seventeen people working on his estate, picking cocoa as well as coffee cherries, bananas, and peewah. Boodram credits being an independent farmer gave him the flexibility to develop his singing career on his own time and terms.

Boodram started professionally singing Indian classical music in 1947 at the age of fourteen. He later ventured out into singing chutney music and was one of the founding fathers of the genre. Here is where he gained immense popularity. He belted out hits such as "Lalana Khoose", "Dhoolar", and "Sham Chabi". His chutney songs were derived from old Bhojpuri folk songs that were sung at Hindu weddings and celebrations of births, as well as from songs he wrote. His chutney songs were known for their raw dialect and fast-paced beats. He also sang bhajans and birahas. He was given the nickname D' Lion of Cumuto by radio announcer Surujpat Mathura. He toured throughout Trinidad and Tobago, as well as internationally in Guyana, Suriname, the United States, Canada, and the United Kingdom. In 2013, he was honored at the Chutney Soca Monarch as one of the "Legends of Chutney". In his later life, he collaborated with younger chutney and chutney soca artist like Ravi Bissambhar and Raymond Ramnarine.

== Personal life ==
He married Cynthia Panday on 29 July 1954. She was the sister of the former Prime Minister of Trinidad and Tobago, Basdeo Panday, and Subhas Panday a lawyer and former politician. Together they had one son and five daughters, twelve grandchildren, and eight great-grandchildren. Boodram could also fluently speak, read, and write in Trinidadian Hindustani. In a 2013 interview, when asked what advice he would give the younger generation of chutney singers, he said that he believed they should learn Hindi and that singing is not just shouting out songs, it should be from your heart with devotion.

== Death and legacy ==
Boodram died at his home in Cumuto on 30 June 2020, at the age of 86. According to his family he had been ailing for some time due to complications from old age. He had spent his last days with his family and friends, as well as reading the Ramcharitamanas. His funeral was done per Kabir Panthi Hindu rights and he was cremated at the Caroni Cremation Site. Rudranath Indarsingh, the member of parliament for Couva South, attended his funeral, as well as his politician brother-in-laws Subhas and Basdeo Panday who attended his cremation rights. Tributes to Sam Boodram came from Surujdeo Mangroo the public relations officer of the National Council of Indian Culture, anthropologist and writer Kumar Mahabir, Southex and Chutney Soca Monarch founder George Singh, and radio and television presenter Rafi Mohammed. Singers also paid tribute to Boodram such as Raymond Ramnarine, Nisha Bissambhar, and JMC 3Veni founder Veerendra Persad, who all said that Boodram paved the way for Indo-Caribbean musicians and that his songs have been played at most Indo-Caribbean weddings, birth celebrations, birthdays, pujas, and parties throughout the diaspora and will continue to live on.
