= Edmund Dillon =

Trinidad and Tobago military officer and politician

Major General Edmund Dillon
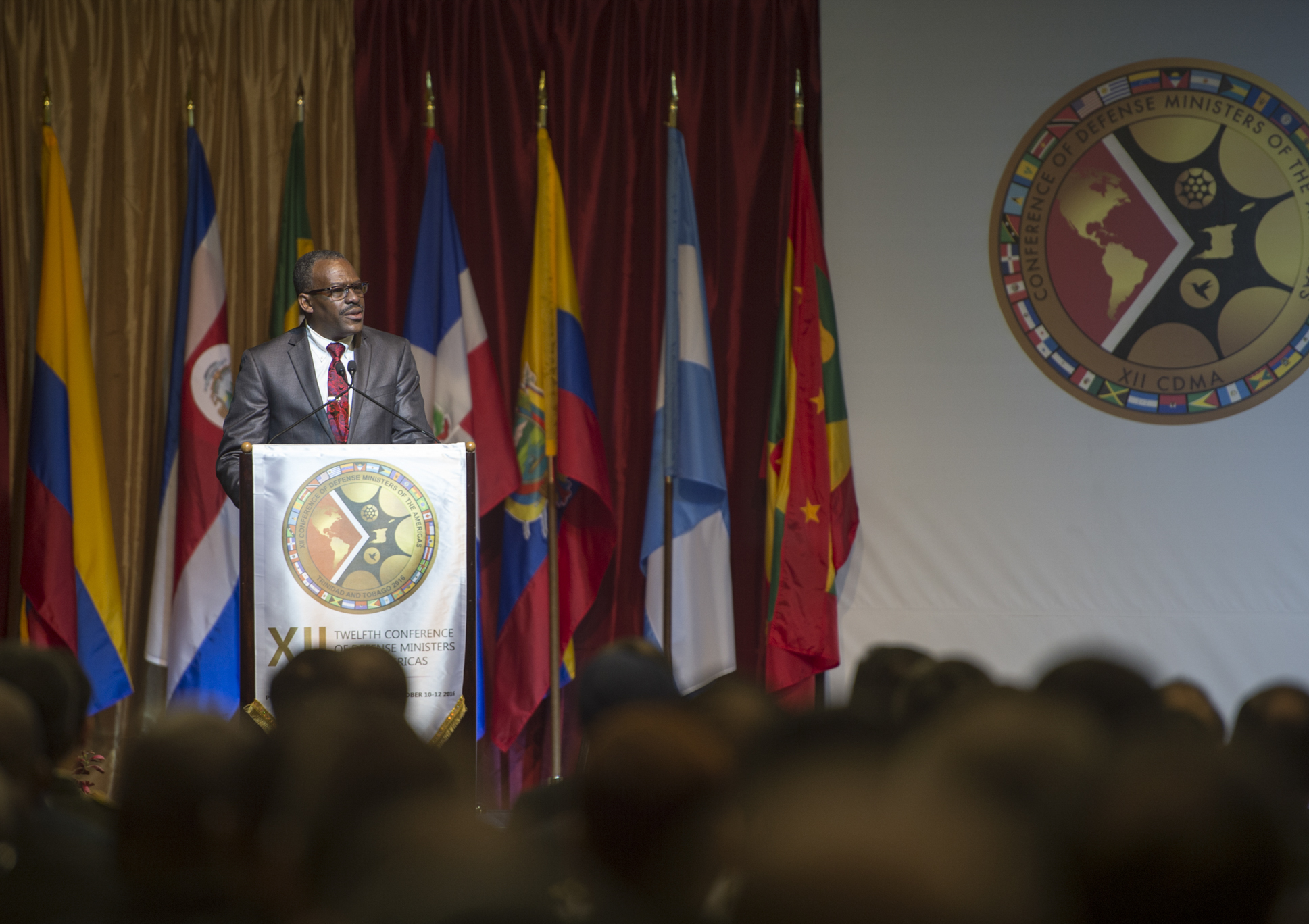
- Dillon speaking as president of the XII Conference of Defense Ministers of the Americas in 2016

Trinidad and Tobago Ambassador to Venezuela
- Incumbent
- Assumed office 17 August 2021
- Prime Minister: Keith Rowley
- Preceded by: Paul Byam

Minister of Housing and Urban Development
- In office 6 August 2018 – 9 August 2020
- Prime Minister: Keith Rowley
- Preceded by: Adrian Leonce
- Succeeded by: Pennelope Beckles

Minister of National Security
- In office 9 September 2015 – 5 August 2018
- Prime Minister: Keith Rowley
- Preceded by: Carlton Alfonso
- Succeeded by: Stuart Young

Member of Parliament for Point Fortin
- In office 9 September 2015 – 9 August 2020
- Preceded by: Paula Gopee-Scoon
- Succeeded by: Kennedy Richards

Personal details
- Party: People's National Movement (PNM)
- Education: University of the West Indies

Military service
- Allegiance: Trinidad and Tobago
- Years of service: 1974–2010
- Rank: Major General
- Commands: Chief of Defence Staff

Edmund Ernest Dillon (born 7 November 1955) is a Trinidad and Tobago military officer, politician and diplomat. He is the current Ambassador for Trinidad and Tobago to the Bolivarian Republic of Venezuela. Dillon enlisted with the Coast Guard and later joined the Trinidad and Tobago Regiment as a commissioned officer. He rose through the ranks and eventually became Chief of Defence Staff, a position that he held from 2006 to 2010. He was a Member of Parliament in the House of Representatives for Point Fortin between 2015 and 2020, when he served as the Minister of National Security and the Minister of Housing and Urban Development.

== Early life ==
Dillon grew up in Guapo, Trinidad. He attended Vessigny Secondary School. He studied at the University of the West Indies, where he received a certificate in management studies, a bachelor's of science in sociology and government, a postgraduate diploma in international relations, and a masters' of science in international relations from the Institute of International Relations.

== Career ==
=== Military career ===
Dillon enlisted with the Coast Guard on 20 September 1974. He applied for an officer cadetship with the Trinidad and Tobago Regiment four years later in August 1978. The following year, he was granted a commission and trained as a cadet at the Royal Military Academy Sandhurst in the United Kingdom. He completed staff officers training at the Canadian Forces Staff School and the Canadian Land Forces Command and Staff College.

He attended courses at the Lester Pearson Peacekeeping Institute in Canada, the Army School of Ammunition in the United Kingdom, the Naval Postgraduate School in Monterey, California, and Fort Leavenworth. He also received a masters' in military arts and science and diploma in military studies from the United States Army Command and General Staff College in 2001, a certificate in national security and defence strategy from the Inter-American Defence College, a certificate in alternative dispute resolution from the University of Windsor.

Dillon served as a battalion adjutant, company commander, and staff officer in finance. He was battalion second in command of the CARICOM Battalion in 1994, during Operation Uphold Democracy in Haiti. He became commanding officer of the 1st and 2nd infantry battalions and the support and service battalion. He was commanding officer of the Trinidad and Tobago Regiment from 2004 to 2006. Dillon was appointed Chief of Defence Staff on 14 August 2006. He retired from this position on 6 November 2010, during a ceremony at Teteron Barracks, Chaguaramas where he was replaced by Roland Maundy. He then worked as director of corporate security at Atlantic LNG.

=== Political career ===
Dillon was first elected as a Member of Parliament in the House of Representatives in the 2015 general election. He contested the constituency of Point Fortin for the People's National Movement (PNM). He was appointed as Minister of National Security on 9 September 2015, a position he held until 5 August 2018 when the cabinet was reshuffled by Prime Minister Keith Rowley. Dillon was replaced by Stuart Young and was reassigned as Minister of Housing and Urban Development with effect from 6 August 2018. In November 2018, a street in Point Fortin – Big Snake Alley – was renamed Edmund Dillon Avenue in his honour. While in office, he oversaw the construction of a new Point Fortin Hospital, a new fire station, and upgrades to the Mahaica Oval.

He was screened by the PNM in May 2020 to re-contest his seat in the 2020 general election, alongside a number of other candidates. The party ultimately chose Kennedy Richards, the mayor of Point Fortin, and Dillon assisted with his campaign. He served as a CARICOM elections observer for the 2020 Saint Vincent and the Grenadines general election.

=== Diplomatic career ===
Dillon was appointed as the Trinidad and Tobago Ambassador to the Bolivarian Republic of Venezuela on 17 August 2021, receiving his instrument of appointment from the Minister of Foreign and CARICOM Affairs, Amery Browne. He was received by Venezuela on 4 February 2022.

== Honours and awards ==
Dillon received a number of awards for his military service, including the Medal of Merit Gold National Award, the Long Service Medal, the Efficiency Decoration, the Naval Order of Merit Medal for Distinguished Service in the First Category from the Dominican Republic, the United States Army Commendation Military Medal of Merit, the Fifth Summit of the Americas Medal, the Delaware Distinguished Service Medal, and the 1990 COUP Medal. He was inducted in the Command and General Staff College's International Hall of Fame on 15 October 2008. He was honoured with the UWI Distinguished Alumni Award on 2 April 2011.

== Personal life ==
Dillon is married to Ava Dillon and has three children: Cleavon Dillon ( an Olympic Athlete for Trinidad and Tobago), Adeisha Dillon and Toni Dillon.
