= Mikko Pyhälä =

Finnish diplomat

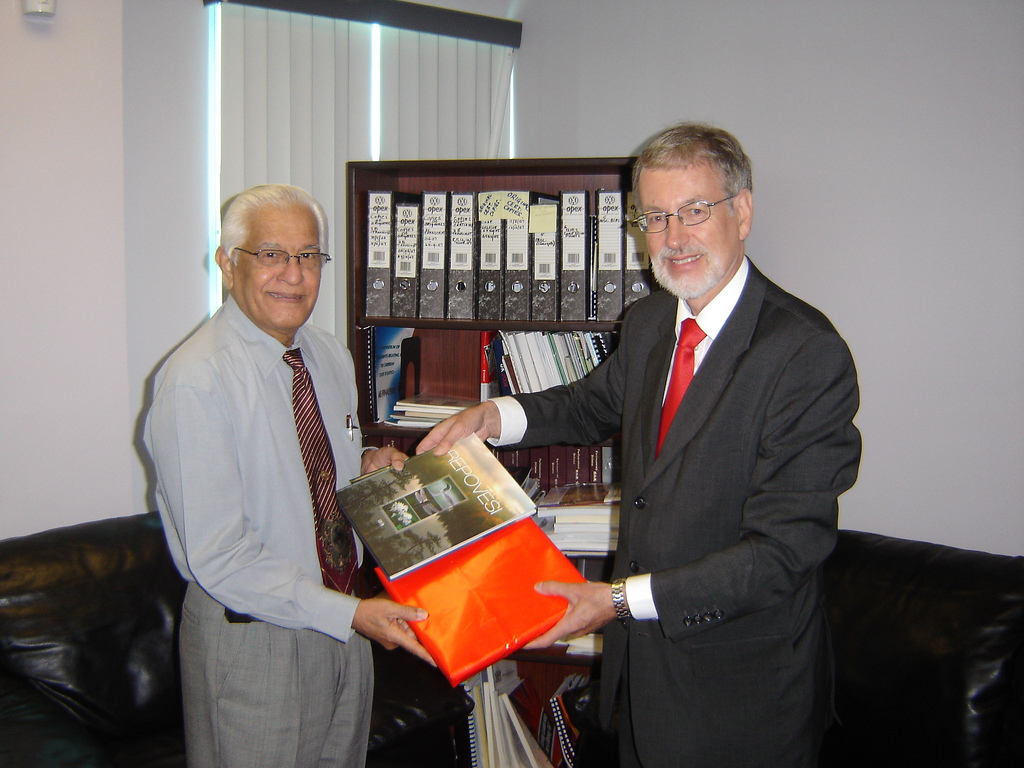
Mikko Pyhälä and Basdeo Panday the prime minister of Trinidad and Tobago

Mikko Pyhälä (born. 1945) is a Finnish diplomat. Pyhälä was employed by the Ministry for Foreign Affairs from 1972 to 2013. He has been working for the last years as Finnish Ambassador to several Caribbean and South American countries.

Pyhälä was Finnish Ambassador to Peru from 1998 to 2002 and to Venezuela from 2006 to 2011 and was also accredited to Colombia and to six Caribbean Island nations and into the organization of CARICOM and Organization of the Eastern Caribbean States.
