= Chief of Defence Staff (Trinidad and Tobago) =

Professional head of the Trinidad and Tobago Defence Force

- Emblem of the TTDF
- Incumbent; Commodore Dan Polo since 7th October 2025
- Trinidad and Tobago Defence Force
- Member of: Defence Council
- Reports to: Minister of Defence
- Appointer: President; on the advice of the Minister
- Constituting instrument: Defence Act: Chapter 14:01
- Formation: 1 June 1962
- First holder: Pearce Gould
- Final holder: Air Vice Marshal Darryl Daniel
- Website: Official website

The Chief of Defence Staff (CDS) is the professional head of the Trinidad and Tobago Defence Force. He is responsible for the administration and the operational control of the military. The CDS reports directly to the Minister of Defence, who holds political responsibility for defence matters, as outlined in Section 191(2) of the Defence Act, Chapter 14:01. The current CDS is Commodore Don Polo, the former commanding officer of the Coast Guard. He was appointed as CDS on 7 October 2025 and promoted to the rank of Commodore, effective October 14, 2025, a week after first being appointed CDS as a Captain "owing to the exigencies." Air Vice Marshal Darryl Daniel appointment as CDS was revoked on 7 October 2025, by the government.

Air Vice Marshal Darryl Daniel was appointed on 25 March 2019 as a Air Commodore and promoted to Air Vice Marshall effective November 1, 2020. Unlike other Caribbean nations, the chief is not called the more common "Chief of Staff". This is due to the strong ties Trinidad and Tobago had to the British equivalent during the establishment of the TTDF.

The Vice Chief of Defence Staff (VCDS) was Brigadier General Dexter Francis, he was reported in the media to be going into retirement in November 2023.

== Role and Functions ==
The Chief of Defence Staff's primary role is to advise the Minister with responsibility for the defence force, currently the Minister of defence, and the government on military matters, and to implement defence policy. Key functions of the CDS include:

- Operational Command: Exercising command and control over all branches of the TTDF, including the Trinidad and Tobago Regiment, the Trinidad and Tobago Coast Guard, the Trinidad and Tobago Air Guard, and the Defence Force Reserves.
- Strategic Planning: Developing and implementing military strategies, plans, and policies in alignment with national security objectives.
- Force Development: Overseeing the training, readiness, and development of the TTDF's personnel and capabilities.
- Resource Management: Managing the defence budget and resources effectively and efficiently.
- Inter-Agency Cooperation: Coordinating with other national security agencies and government departments on matters of mutual interest.
- Military Advice: Providing expert military advice to the government on a wide range of issues, including national security threats, defence capabilities, and international military relations.
- Ceremonial Duties: Representing the TTDF at official events and ceremonies.

The Vice Chief of Defence Staff assists the CDS in their duties and may act on their behalf in their absence. The specific responsibilities of the Vice CDS are determined by the CDS and the needs of the Defence Force.

== List of officeholders ==
No.	Portrait	Name (birth–death)	Term of office			Defence branch	Ref.
No.	Portrait	Name (birth–death)	Took office	Left office	Time in office	Defence branch	Ref.
1		Lt. Col. Pearce Gould	1 June 1962	1964	1–2 years	Regiment	
2		Col. Joffre Serrette	1964	February 1968	3–4 years	Regiment	
3		Col Stanley L. Johnson M.O.M.	February 1968	April 1970	1–2 years	Regiment	
(2)		Brigadier; Joffre Serrette	1970	1978	7–8 years	Regiment	
4		Commodore; Mervyn O. Williams	1978	1989	10–11 years	Coast Guard	
5		Brigadier; Joseph Theodore	1990	1991	0–1 years	Regiment	
6		Brigadier; Ralph Brown	1991	1994	2–3 years	Regiment	
7		Brigadier; Carlton Alfred Alfonso	1994	1999	4–5 years	Regiment	
8		Commodore; Anthony S Franklin	1999	2000	0–1 years	Coast Guard	
9		John CE Sandy	2000	2002	1–2 years	Regiment	
10		Brigadier; Ancil Antoine	26 January 2002	2006	3–4 years	Regiment	
11		Major general Edmund Dillon	2006	6 November 2011	4–5 years	Regiment	
12		Brigadier; Roland Maundy	6 November 2011	2012	0–1 years	Regiment	
13		Major general Kenrick Maharaj	2011	2011	0 years	Regiment	
13		Major general Kenrick Maharaj	2011	2015	3–4 years	Regiment	
14		Major general Rodney Smart	2015	9 August 2017	1–2 years	Regiment	
15		Rear admiral Hayden Pritchard	9 August 2017	25 March 2019	1 year, 228 days	Coast Guard	
16		Air Vice Marshall; Darryl Daniel	25 March 2019	7 October 2025	6 years, 196 days	Air Guard	
17		Commodore; Don Polo	7 October 2025	Incumbent	1 year, 29 days	Coast Guard	

== Notable Chiefs of Defence Staff ==
This section highlights individuals who have served as Chief of Defence Staff of Trinidad and Tobago and have subsequently made significant contributions in other sectors:

Brigadier Joseph Theodore first military experience started with participating in the Cadet Force at St Mary's College in Port-of-Spain. He was among the first Trinidad and Tobago nationals to attend the Royal Military Academy Sandhurst in England as an officer cadet from the West India Regiment. He joined the West India Regiment, based in Jamaica during the 1958-1961 West Indies Federation. Following the Federation's dissolution in 1961, Theodore served for two years as a lieutenant in the Jamaica Regiment. In 1964, he returned to Trinidad and Tobago and joined the T&T Regiment as a captain. He subsequently became a company commander and then a major after the events of 1970. Brigadier Joseph Theodore then rose to become the Chief of Defence Staff (CDS) of the Trinidad and Tobago Defence Force. His tenure as CDS is primarily noted for his leadership during the July 1990 attempted coup d'état by the Jamaat al Muslimeen. During this period, Brigadier Theodore coordinated the military's response, maintained command and control, and oversaw the deployment of troops. He was also involved in negotiations with Bilaal Abdullah at the Red House, where then Prime Minister ANR Robinson and Members of Parliament were held hostage. Following his military service, Brigadier Joseph Theodore served as the Minister of National Security during the 5th Republican Parliament (1995-2000). Joseph Theodore died on September 21, 2013. Tributes were paid to him in the Senate on Monday, September 23, 2013, by Senators Gary Griffith, Terrence Deyalsingh, Elton Prescott, and Timothy Hamel Smith.

Brigadier John CE Sandy joined the Defence Force in 1966 and participated in several military operations, including the 1994 peace-keeping exercise in Haiti, where he was Commander of the CARICOM Forces. He served as Defence and Military Attaché to the US at the Washington Embassy from November 1997 to April 2000. He returned to Trinidad and Tobago in July 2000 and was elevated to the rank of Brigadier in 2000, subsequently being promoted to Chief of Defence Staff (CDS). In December 2001, he was presented with the Legion of Merit Degree of Officer by United States Ambassador Roy Austin for meritorious service as Defence and Military Attaché to the US. After his military career, which ended in 2002, Brigadier Sandy transitioned into politics. He was appointed a Senator in Parliament and also served as the Minister of National Security. In 2006, Brig. Sandy was the head of security for the Soca Warriors football team during their participation in the World Cup in Germany.

Major General Rodney Smart has held a variety of leadership positions within the Trinidad and Tobago Defence Force, as well as roles in national security and disaster management. In 1988, he led a platoon in Jamaica following Hurricane Gilbert. From 1995 to 1996, he commanded a Support Company in the CARICOM Battalion during the UN Peacekeeping Mission to Haiti. Following Hurricane Ivan in 2004, he served as the 2nd Task Force Commander in Grenada. While holding the rank of Colonel and Director of Force Development, Strategy and Management, he served as interim CEO of the Office of Disaster Preparedness and Management (ODPM) from 2010 to 2011. He later served as Chief of Defence Staff of the Trinidad and Tobago Defence Force, and as National Coordinator of the National Crime Prevention Programme. In August 2017 he was promoted to the rank of Major General. In 2019, he was appointed CEO of the ODPM, a position he held from September 2 of that year. Major General Smart is a graduate of the US Army War College and the Command and General Staff College, holding a Master’s Degree in Strategic Studies and postgraduate qualifications in Military Art and Science. He also holds a Degree in Management Studies from the University of the West Indies and is a Fellow of the Institute of Leadership and Management.

== See also ==
- Trinidad and Tobago Defence Force
- Trinidad and Tobago Regiment
- Ministry of Defense (Trinidad and Tobago)
