= Raffique Shah =

Trinidad & Tobago trade unionist (born 1946)

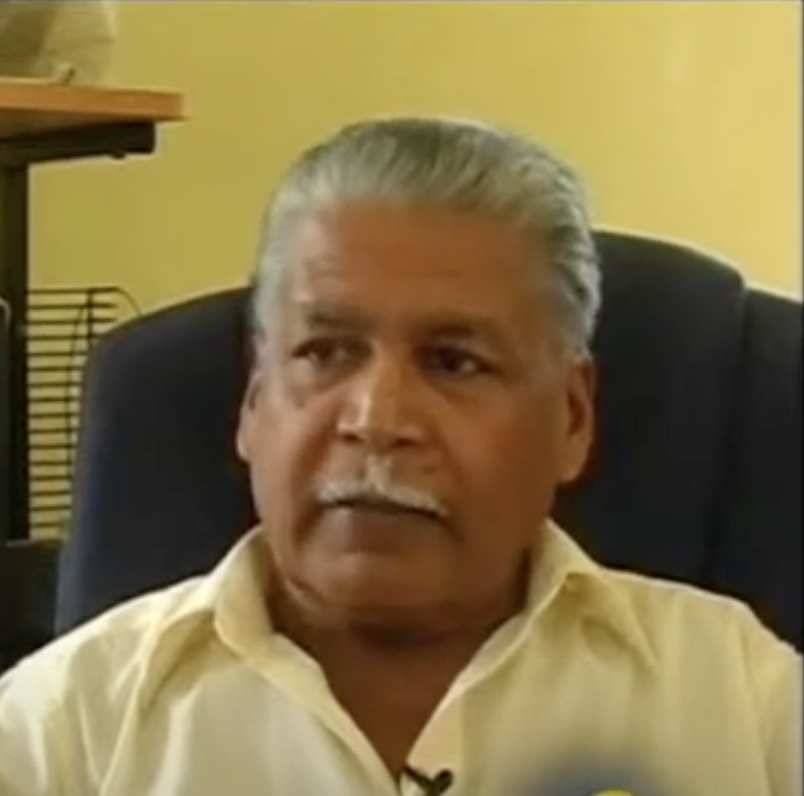
Trinidadian politician Raffique Shah

Raffique Shah (born 1946) is a Trinidad and Tobago trade union leader and political commentator. He is also a former Member of Parliament and mutineer, having led a mutiny of Trinidad and Tobago Regiment in 1970.

== Biography ==
Shah was born the son of a sugarcane worker and housewife in March 1946. His early education was at Presentation College, Chaguanas, where he gained a Grade I Cambridge School Certificate. He later won a cadetship to the prestigious British Royal Military Academy Sandhurst between 1964 and 1966.

As a lieutenant in the Trinidad and Tobago Regiment, he led an army mutiny in 1970. In the midst of Black Power riots, the People's National Movement government led by Eric Williams proclaimed a State of Emergency in April 1970 and arrested several Black Power leaders and Trade Unionists. In a move to prevent Williams from using the military against the masses, a portion of the Regiment stationed at Teteron (on the Chaguaramas Peninsula), led by Lieutenants Shah and Rex Lassalle mutinied. In response, the Trinidad and Tobago Coast Guard fired on the mutineers who returned to Teteron Barracks, abandoning their foray into Port of Spain. After 10 days, the mutineers surrendered. The leaders were court-martialed and Shah and Lasalle were jailed. They both went on to win their appeals at the local Court of Appeal, and judges at the Privy Council in London, England, ruled against the State's appeal in July 1972. Shah, Lassalle and all the other mutineers were freed within 24 hours of that ruling.

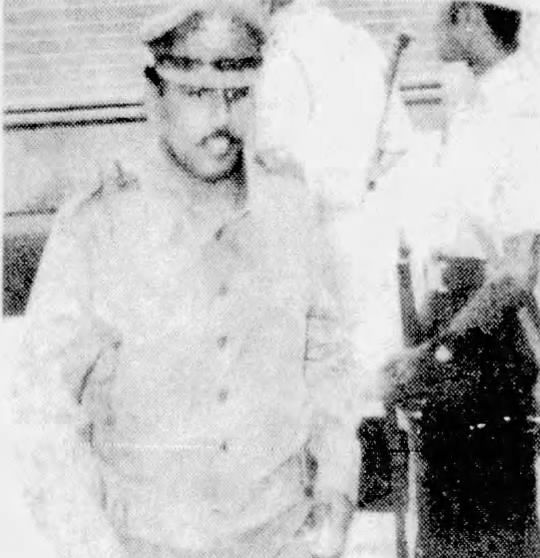
Shah in 1977

After being released from prison Shah joined the Trade Union movement leading the ICFTU, a body of cane farmers who sought to displace the government-recognised organisation, TICFA (Trinidad Islandwide Cane Farmers' Association). Shah, George Weekes and Basdeo Panday went on to found the United Labour Front (ULF) in 1975 as a labour confederation and transformed it into a political party in 1976. During general election later that year, the ULF secured 10 of the 36 seats in Parliament and became the official Opposition. Basdeo Panday was appointed Leader of the Opposition, but following a bitter row in the party, Shah was able to displace him, and served as Leader of the Opposition between August 9, 1977 and March 31, 1978 when Panday regained control of the party.

Shah went on to lead the cane farmers and won an election to head the Trinidad Island-wide Cane Farmers' Association (TICFA), in 1998. He has been chairman of that organisation to date. Shah also served as editor of the Trinidad and Tobago Mirror newspaper for 17 years and went on to serve as an op-ed columnist in the Trinidad and Tobago Express newspaper. He is also known as the man who founded the prestigious annual Clico Trinidad & Tobago International Marathon, an event that spawned road-running throughout the Caribbean. He remained chairman of the organising committee until he stepped down in 2005. He served, too, as secretary of the local National Amateur Athletics Association and still holds a strong interest in sports in general and athletics in particular.

== See also ==
- Black Power Revolution
- Rex Lassalle

| Preceded by Basdeo Panday | Leader of the Opposition of Trinidad and Tobago; 1977–1978 | Succeeded by Basdeo Panday |
