= Brinsley Samaroo =

Trinidad and Tobago politician and historian (1940–2023)

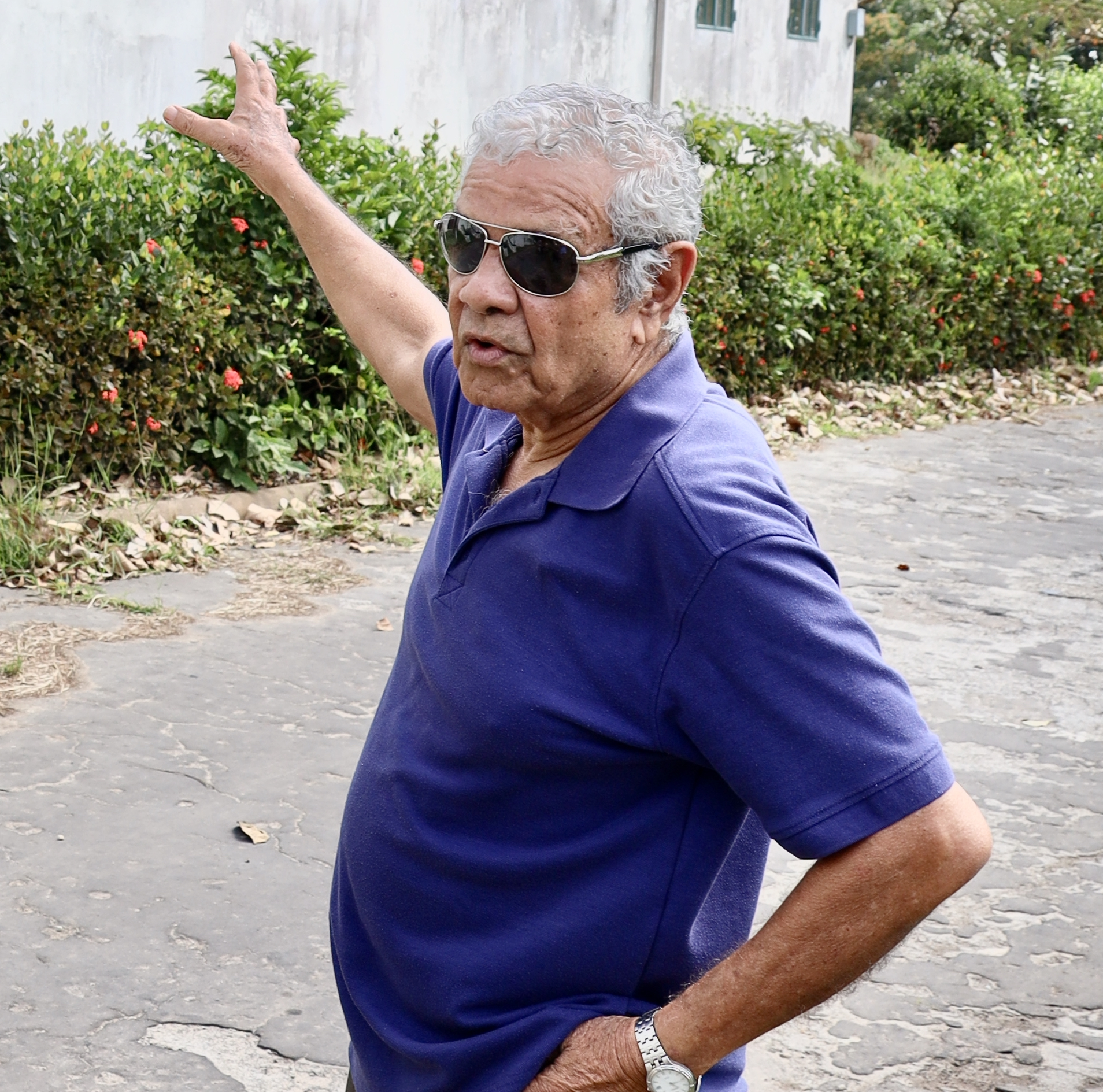
- Brinsley Samaroo at Sevilla House, Brechin Castle, Couva, 2020
- Born: 14 April 1940
- Died: 9 July 2023 (aged 83)
- Occupations: Historian and politician

Academic background
- Thesis: The Constitutional Development of Trinidad, 1898-1925 (1969)

Brinsley Samaroo (14 April 1940–9 July 2023) was a Trinidad and Tobago historian and former politician who served as the Minister of Local Government and Decentralisation and the Minister of Food Production under the National Alliance for Reconstruction government.

== Early life and education ==
Samaroo was born on 14 April 1940 in Rio Claro, in south Trinidad, the youngest of seven children of George and Myna Samaroo. Both George and Myna were the children of indentured Indians. Samaroo grew up in Ecclesville, outside Rio Claro, where his grandfather, Gobindaye Samaroo, had worked for Canadian Presbyterian missionaries who developed the settlement.

Samaroo won a scholarship to attend Naparima College, where he received his secondary education. At Naparima he lived in the dormitories along with other students who lived outside San Fernando. He became close friends with Kenneth Ramchand, a fellow "dormitory boy".

In 1960 Samaroo applied for a scholarship to study in India. He was awarded a scholarship by the government of India and attended the Delhi University from 1961 to 1965, where he received his B.A. and M.A.

Samaroo won a Commonwealth Scholarship to study at Birbeck College, University of London. He defended his dissertation in 1969.

== Career ==
Samaroo returned to Trinidad and Tobago in 1965 and taught at Naparima College for a year.

=== Academics ===
Samaroo served on the faculty of the University of the West Indies at St. Augustine from 1968 until 1986, and again from 1992 to 2005. He was department chair twice. From 2005 to 2010 he was a Senior Research Fellow at the University of Trinidad and Tobago.

Samaroo played a "pioneering role" in the field of Indo-Caribbean history; historian Bridget Brereton describes Samaroo was "unquestionably" the leader of this group. His work in the field includes two collections, India in the Caribbean (1987) and Across Dark Waters (1996) which he co-edited with David Dabydeen, and The Construction of an Indo-Caribbean Diaspora with Anne-Marie Bissessar.

Samaroo admired labour leader Adrian Cola Rienzi, and his 2022 biography Adrian Cola Rienzi: The life and times of and Indo-Caribbean progressive, was described by Bridget Brereton as "perhaps his most important book".

Historian Richard Drayton also describes Samaroo's work as creating a "global conversation" with collaborators in Fiji, Mauritius, Natal and India to explore the common experience of Indian indentureship among the descendants of the girimitayas. Samaroo also published work on the Presbyterian Indo-Trinidadians and on African and Indian Muslims in Trinidad and Guyana.

Samaroo edited the final manuscript of former Prime Minister of Trinidad and Tobago, Eric Williams, for publication. The manuscript, which Williams had worked on over the course of the final decade of his life, was published in 2022 as The Blackest thing in Slavery was not the Black Man. Samaroo was "fascinated" with Williams' life and work. Drayton described Samaroo's editing of the book as "sympathetic and respectful".

=== Activism ===
As a lecturer at the University of the West Indies, Samaroo was supportive of the Black Power movement, working quietly to aid grassroots groups, while trying to defuse Indo-Trinidadians' fears about the movement. David Nicholls described Samaroo and other Indo-Trinidadians at UWI as supporting the goals of the movement "without committing themselves totally to it". According to Richard Drayton, he also provided assistance to the National Union of Freedom Fighters.

After the closure of Caroni (1975) Limited, national sugar company, Samaroo was able to rescue the company's archives, which were in the process of being discarded as "old paper". He also worked to establish a sugar museum and sugar village at Sevilla House, part of the defunct company, but was unsuccessful in his efforts.

=== Politics and government ===
He was appointed to the Senate by the United National Congress, and served in the Second Republican Senate between 1981 and 1986, where he served as the leader of the Opposition. In the 1986 general elections he contested the Nariva constituency on behalf of the National Alliance for Reconstruction. He won the election and went on to serve as Minister in the Office of the Prime Minister, Minister of Decentralisation, and Minister of Food Production and Marine Exploitation.

== Personal life ==
Samaroo married Joan Ramdeen in 1971 and had two daughters.
