= Aripov =

Aripov (Russian: Арипов or Орипов, Uzbek: Oripov) is a Central Asian masculine surname, its feminine counterpart is Aripova. It may refer to

- Abdulla Aripov (born 1961), Prime Minister of Uzbekistan
- Abdulla Oripov (poet) (1941–2016), Uzbek poet, literary translator, and politician
- Dilshod Aripov (born 1977), Uzbekistani wrestler
- Farkhod Oripov (born 1984), Tajik swimmer
