= Jennifer Jones-Kernahan =

Trinidad and Tobago politician and diplomat

The Honourable Jennifer Jones

Member of the Senate
- In office 20 February 2001 – 1 March 2010

Personal details
- Born: Jennifer Jones; 26 October 1953 (age 72)
- Party: United National Congress (UNC)
- Spouse: Malcolm "Jai" Kernahan
- Relatives: Altheia Jones-LeCointe, Beverly Jones (sisters)

Jennifer Jones-Kernahan (née Jones; born 26 October 1953) is a Trinidad and Tobago politician and diplomat. She has been a senator, government minister and ambassador.

== Early life ==
Jennifer Jones was born in Belmont, Port of Spain, to Viola, a dressmaker, and Dunstan, a school principal. She had an older sister, Altheia (born in 1945), a younger sister, Beverly (born in 1955) and a younger brother, Phillip. Her sister Altheia won and Island Scholarship and left Trinidad to study biochemistry in the United Kingdom in 1965, where she went on to lead the British Black Panthers. Viola emigrated to the United States in the late 1960s in search of work, leaving her younger children in the care of their grandmother.

== Career ==
In the 1970s she was involved in the National Union of Freedom Fighters and her sister Beverly was killed by police.

Jones-Kernahan was appointed a government senator by the United National Congress (UNC) in 2001 and served as minister of food production and marine resources from June 2001-December 2001. She was reappointed as an opposition senator in October 2002, and again in December 2007, and served as high commissioner to Cuba from November 2010-October 2015.

In the 2007 Trinidad and Tobago general election she was the UNC candidate in La Horquetta/Talparo. In 2008, she was appointed shadow minister of Social and Community Development, Agriculture, Marine Affairs and Land, Gender and Consumer Affairs.

== Personal life ==
She is married to Malcolm "Jai" Kernahan. She is the mother of four children. Activist and physician Altheia Jones-LeCointe is her older sister.
