= Rex Lassalle =

Trinidadian military officer (1945–2025)

Reginald Andrew Lassalle (26 November 1945 – 13 February 2025), better known as Rex Lassalle, was a Trinidadian alternative medicine practitioner and lieutenant in the Trinidad and Tobago Regiment who was a leader of an army mutiny in April 1970 as part of the Black Power Revolution.

== Early life and education ==
Lassalle was born in Belmont, Port of Spain, Trinidad, in 1945 to a middle-class Catholic family. He attended Belmont Boys Intermediate School and St. Mary's College, Port of Spain. Lassalle attended the Royal Military Academy Sandhurst from January 1965 to December 1966. Lassalle returned to Trinidad and Tobago where he served as a second lieutenant and later as a lieutenant in the Trinidad and Tobago Regiment.

At Sandhurst, Lassalle experienced racism and struggled with the underlying mission to maintain the status quo. He described his experience of being asked to produce "a written military appreciation of how to wipe out a Mau Mau enclave" as a turning point. After leaving the United Kingdom, Lassalle spent three weeks visiting an aunt in New York in the aftermath of the Watts riots and the assassination of Malcolm X. While there, he read Franz Fanon's The Wretched of the Earth, which inspired him to read Fanon's other works. Lassalle described these experiences in Harlem as his "finishing school".

== Army mutiny ==
On 21 April 1970, amid ongoing unrest, the Government of Trinidad and Tobago declared a state of emergency and arrested most of the leadership of the Black Power movement. When the Trinidad and Tobago regiment was summoned to the capital, Port of Spain to help enforce order about half of the army, led by Lassalle, Raffique Shah and other junior officers, refused to take up arms against the citizenry. Lassalle saw many of the senior officers as incompetent and unconcerned with the welfare of the people soldiers. As Shah later said, he and Lassalle also "felt the Government...no longer commanded a majority [of support]". Many of the soldiers were drawn from the same urban working class communities that Black Power movement drew its support from. Many of the officers that led them knew the university students they were being called upon to arrest. Lassalle was suspected of having ties to the Black Power leaders and had been under surveillance by the government.

Lassalle and Shah, together with other junior officers, staged a mutiny and took control of the Teteron Barracks, at Teteron Bay northwest of the capital. When the mutineers tried to leave Teteron, they were fired upon by the Trinidad and Tobago Coast Guard, and unwilling to engage in a fire-fight, they returned to base. Shah later said that "Rex Lassalle and I had agreed there would be no bloodshed, once we could avoid it". The mutineers held Teteron for 10 days, while engaging in negotiations with the government. Lassalle took the role of chief negotiator with the government; their demands included a general amnesty, promotion of Lassalle and Shah to the rank of captain, and the reinstatement of Lieutenant-Colonel Joffre Serrette as commanding officer of the regiment.

The arrival of Venezuelan warships off the coast of Trinidad provided a common foe to the loyalists in the army and coast guard and the rebels. Lassalle reported that the mutineers were prepared to break off negotiations in response to the threat, while the loyalists were reportedly unwilling to fight against the rebels if foreign troops landed. The United States dispatched six warships and 2000 marines with the stated goal of protecting United States citizens in the country. The United States also supplied the government with weapons to arm loyalist units.

=== Aftermath ===
Serrette was re-appointed commanding officer, the mutineers surrendered. Lassalle and Shah were appointed co-commanders of the regiment. They were subsequently arrested and charged with more than 50 offences including treason and mutiny. Although he was never tried for treason, Lassalle was court-martialled in March 1971 and sentenced to 15 years imprisonment. He appealed, won the appeal, and was set free 27 July 1972 after an appeal by the State to the Privy Council. In total he served 27 months in prison.

== Later life and death ==
Lassalle studied osteopathy, acupuncture and homeopathy and other practices of alternative medicine in the United Kingdom and later settled in Finland.

Lassalle died in Finland on 13 February 2025, at the age of 79.

== Books ==
- Lassalle, Rex (1999). Grasshopping through Time using Ancient Wisdom. Rex Lassalle - Publisher, London. ISBN 0-9532185-0-3.
- Lassalle, Rex (2009). Spa Massage for Shoulders, Neck and Face. Pentagram Design, Finland. ISBN 978-952-92-6811-5.

== See also ==
- Eric Williams
- Makandal Daaga
- Stokely Carmichael
