= Aripo Savannas =

Aripo savannah is a tropical savanna ecosystem in the northeast of Trinidad. It is a rare example of savannas formed due to edaphic factors, i.e. the growth of trees is restricted not by climate but by a shallow layer of clay. This impervious hardpan clay layer restricts the growth of roots and magnifies both seasonal flooding and seasonal drought. These factors combined with regular exposure to the uninterrupted tropical sun make the savannas a hostile environment for most plants and animals.

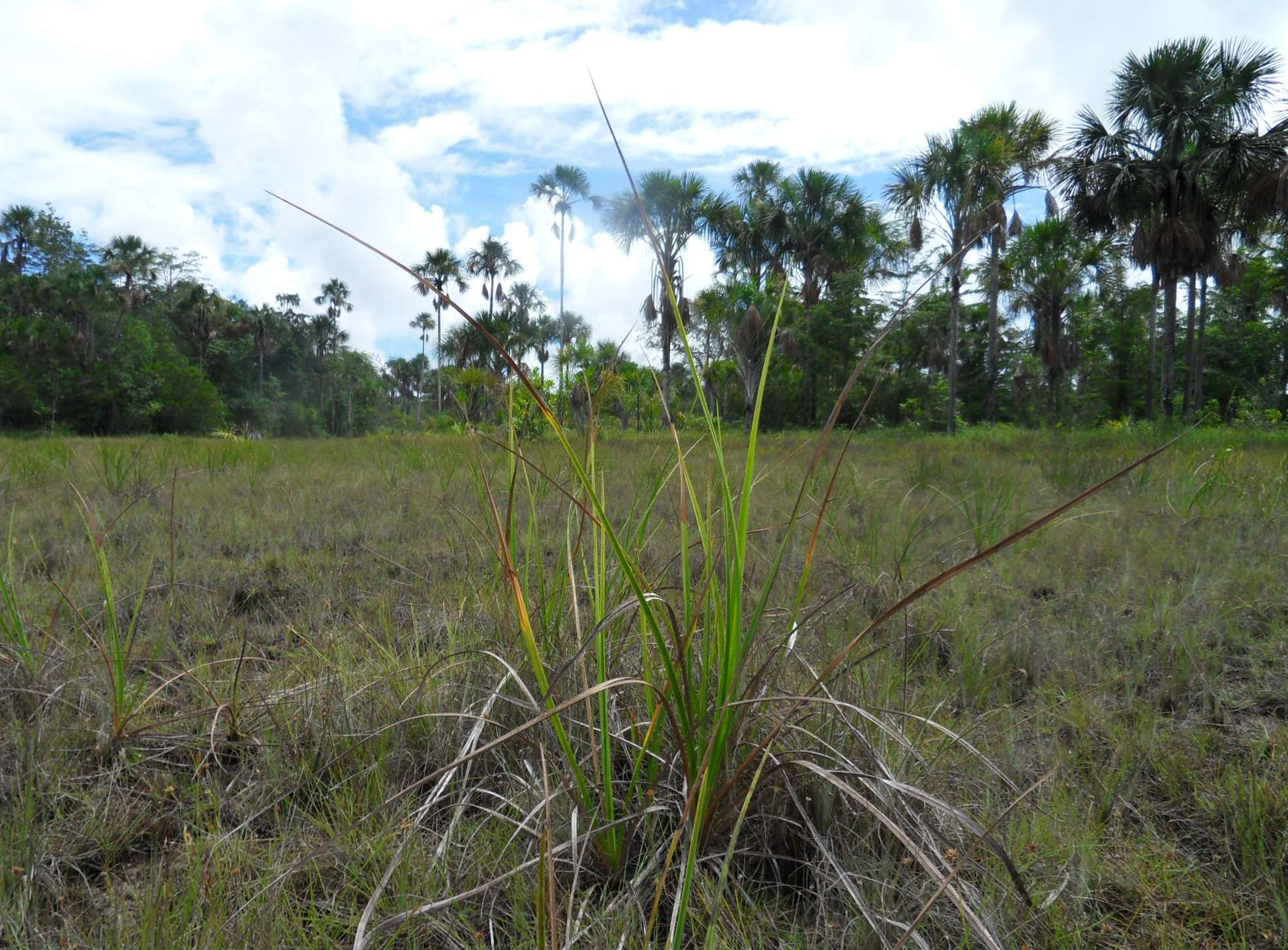
Aripo savannas

Although the edaphic layer is distinct, the Aripo savannas is ecologically similar to other tropical hyperseasonal savannas, such as those found within Gran Sabana in Venezuela or Cerrado in Brazil. In fact, some of the dominant grassland species are shared between all three savannas.

The savannas are home to many rare plants, including at least two endemic species: Rhynchospora aripoensis and Xyris grisebachii. They also provides a habitat for several rare and threatened animals. In the past, the area has been exposed to considerable disturbance due to human activity, but the savannas along with the associated Marsh and Palm forests are now protected within the 1,788 hectare Aripo Savannas Environmentally Sensitive Area.
