= Trinidad and Tobago Regiment =

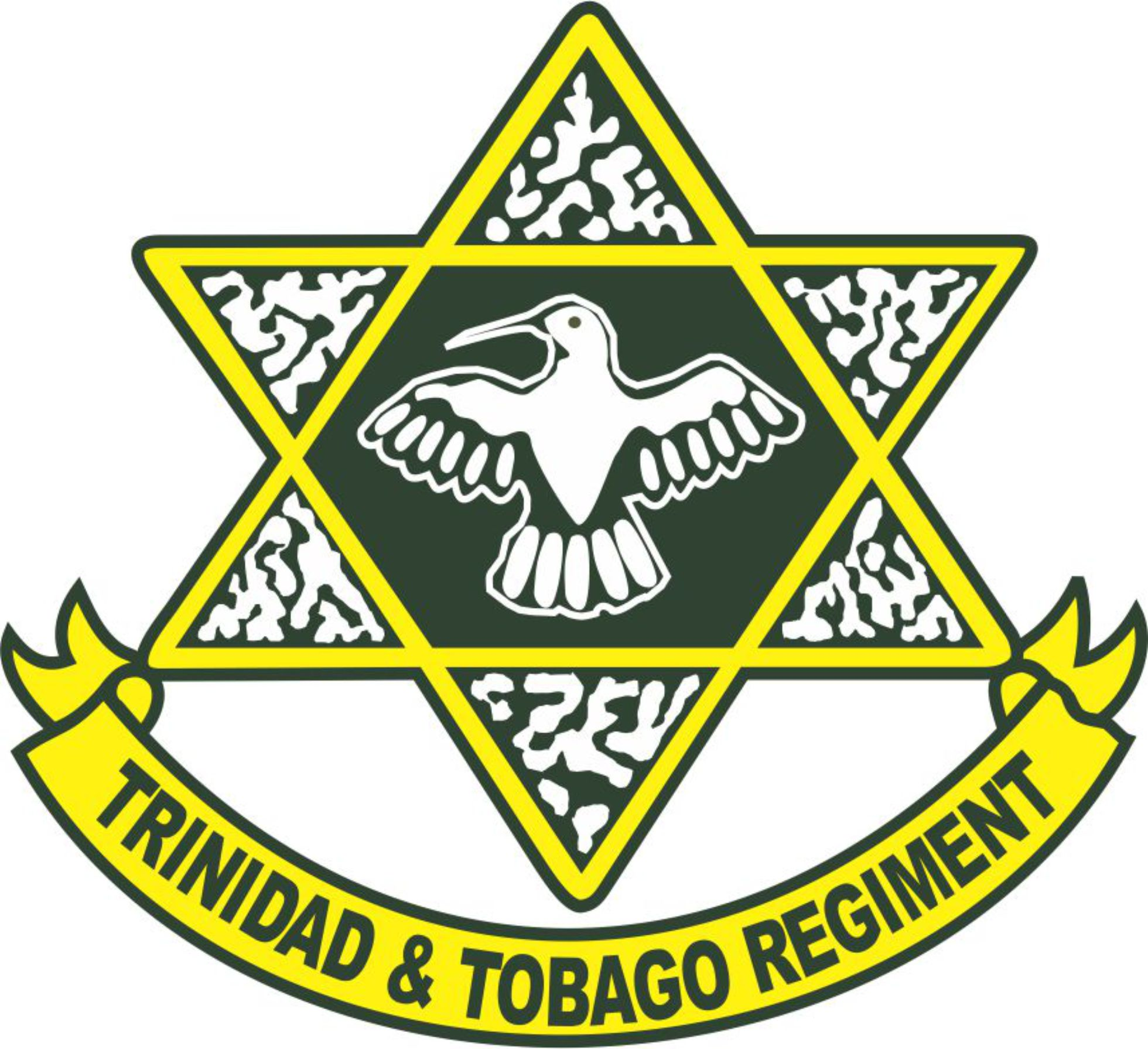
- Cap badge of the Trinidad and Tobago Regiment
- Active: 1962-present
- Country: Trinidad and Tobago
- Branch: Trinidad and Tobago Defence Force
- Type: Infantry; Engineers; Service; Support
- Role: Light role (two battalions); Engineers (one battalion); Logistic Support (one battalion)
- Size: Four battalions ~ 4000
- Part of: Trinidad and Tobago Defence Force
- Garrison/HQ: 'Regiment HQ' - Port of Spain '1st Infantry Battalion' - St. James '2nd Infantry Battalion' - La Romaine 'Engineer Battalion' - Cumuto 'Support & Service Battalion' - Chaguaramas
- Nickname: The Regiment or "Army"
- Mottos: To Guard and Defend
- Colors: Green and Yellow
- Anniversaries: July 23rd

Commanders
- Commanding officer of Regiment: Colonel Dwayne Edwards
- Chief of Defence Staff: Commodore Don Polo
- Notable commanders: Lt Col P Pierce Gould (First Commanding Officer: 1962-1964); Maj Gen Ralph Brown (1988 - 1991); Maj Gen Edmund Dillon' former CDS, Min of National Security and Current Ambassador

The Trinidad and Tobago Regiment is the main ground force element of the Trinidad and Tobago Defence Force. It has approximately 4,000 men and women organized into a Regiment Headquarters (located in Port of Spain) and four battalions. There is also a Volunteer Defence Force that has been renamed the Defence Force Reserves. The regiment has two primary roles: maintaining the internal security of Trinidad and Tobago, and the assistance of local law enforcement.

As one of the largest military forces in the region, the Trinidad and Tobago Regiment is also one of the main units used in peacekeeping and humanitarian situations from the Caribbean region, most recently in Grenada after Hurricane Ivan.

The Trinidad and Tobago Regiment also provides the bulk of the musicians assigned to the Trinidad and Tobago Defence Force Steel Orchestra, the world's only military steel band. The current commanding officer of the regiment is Colonel Dwayne Edwards, with the Chief of Defence Staff (CDS) being Commodore Dan Polo.

== History ==
The Trinidad and Tobago Regiment has its origins the late 19th century, though it was directly spawned from the break-up of the Federation of the West Indies in 1962. At that time, the two battalions of the West India Regiment were split and came under the control of the main nations formed by the split. The 1st Battalion became the 1st Battalion, Jamaica Regiment, while the 2nd Battalion was transferred to Trinidad and Tobago to become the 1st Battalion, Trinidad and Tobago Regiment. A second battalion was raised in 1965, but was disbanded in 1972.

=== Major conflicts ===
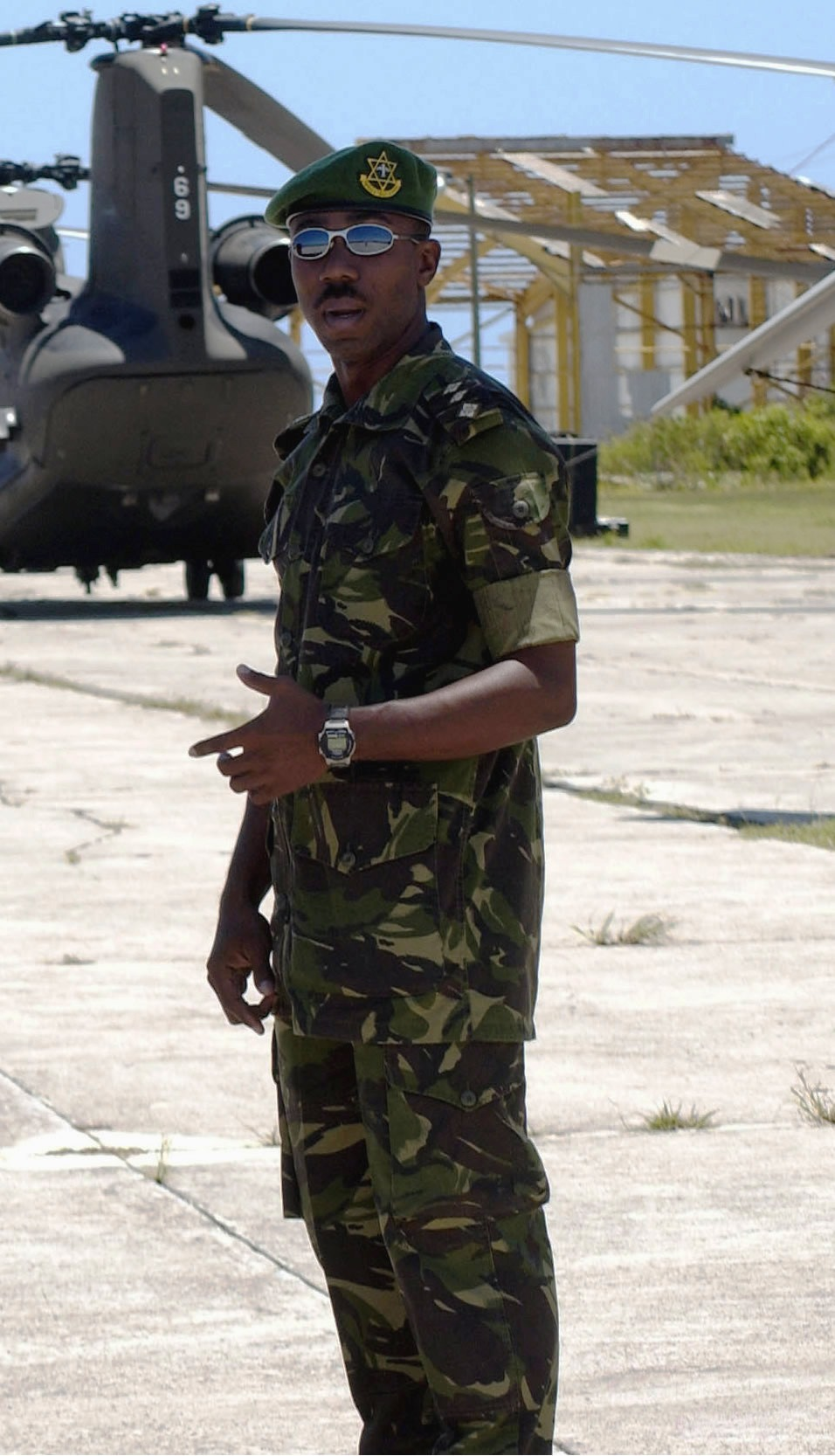
Captain (Capt) Roger McLean with the Trinidad and Tobago Defense Force, at the V.C. Bird International Airport, on the island of Antigua in 2002.

The Trinidad and Tobago Regiment has been involved in two major conflicts.

- On April 21, 1970, 750 members of the regiment mutinied, under the leadership of Raffique Shah and Rex Lassalle. After a five-day stand-off, the mutineers surrendered. The leadership was court-martialed and Shah, Lasalle and others were jailed (see Black Power Revolution).
- On July 27, 1990, the Jamaat al Muslimeen, an islamist group with ties to Libya, attempted a coup d'état. They seized control of the Red House (the seat of the Parliament of Trinidad and Tobago) and held the Prime Minister and much of his Cabinet hostage. The Regiment surrounded the insurgents and were able to force them to surrender on August 1.

See: Jamaat al Muslimeen coup attempt

=== International missions ===
- 1983 to 1984 - Trinidad and Tobago contributed troops to the peacekeeping mission after the United States' invasion of Grenada (Operation Urgent Fury). The Trinidad and Tobago Government opposed the military intervention by the United States and did not participate in the invasion. However T&T deployed troops to assist in peacekeeping after the combat mission was completed.
- 1993 to 1996 - The Trinidad and Tobago Regiment contributed troops to the United Nations Peacekeeping Mission in Haiti (UNMIH) as part of a CARICOM contingent.
- 2004 to 2005 - After the mass destruction dealt to Grenada by Hurricane Ivan, the Regiment was sent immediately after to help assist the Grenadian government in security, aid distribution and rebuilding of the country.

=== Other incidents ===
- On 26 April 1988 - A bush fire near Camp Omega, a military compound in Chaguaramas which was used for ammunition storage and infantry training, killed two soldiers and four firefighters when the fire spread to one of the buildings housing the ammunition.

== Organisation ==
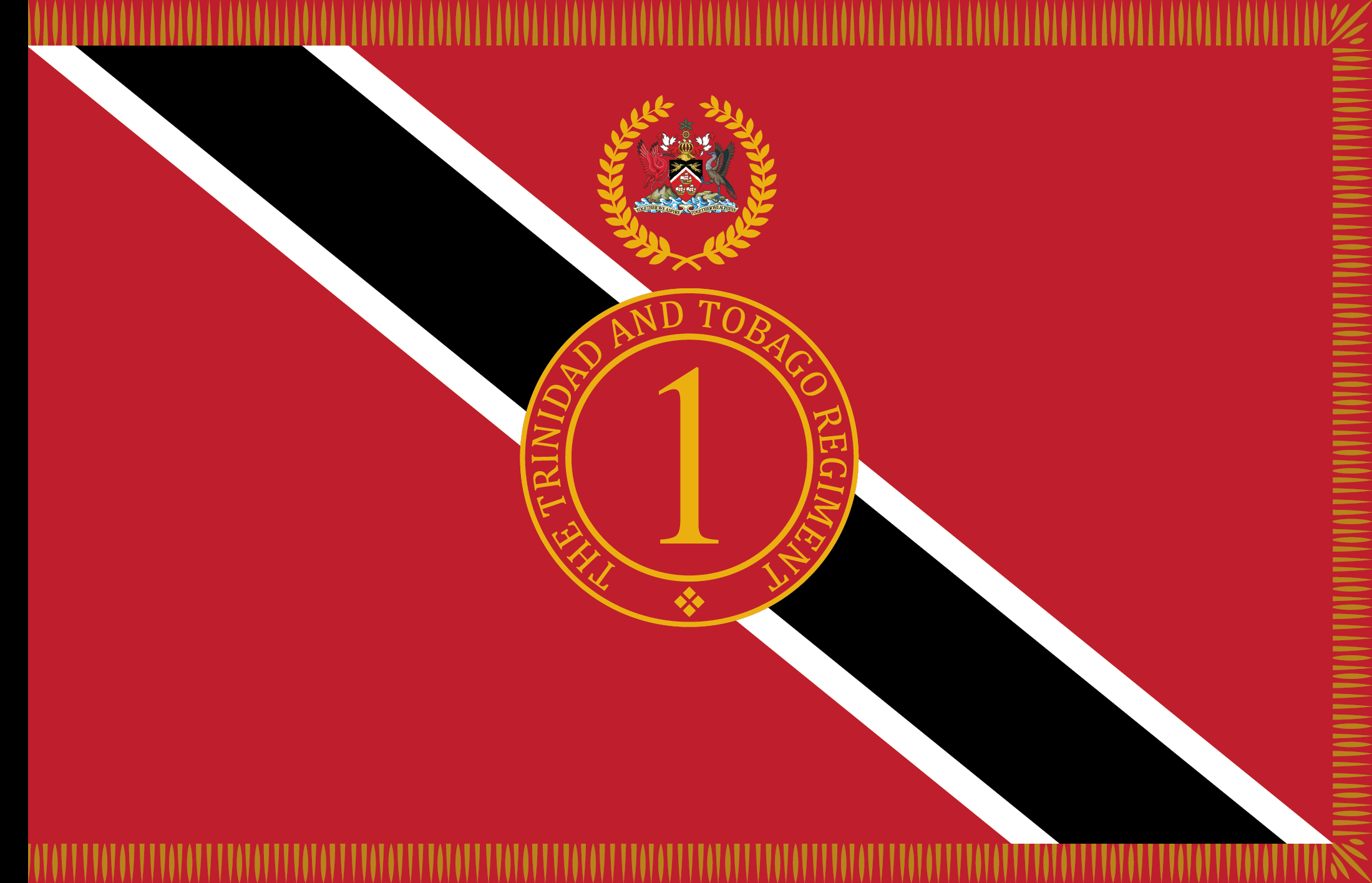
President's Colour of the Trinidad and Tobago Regiment

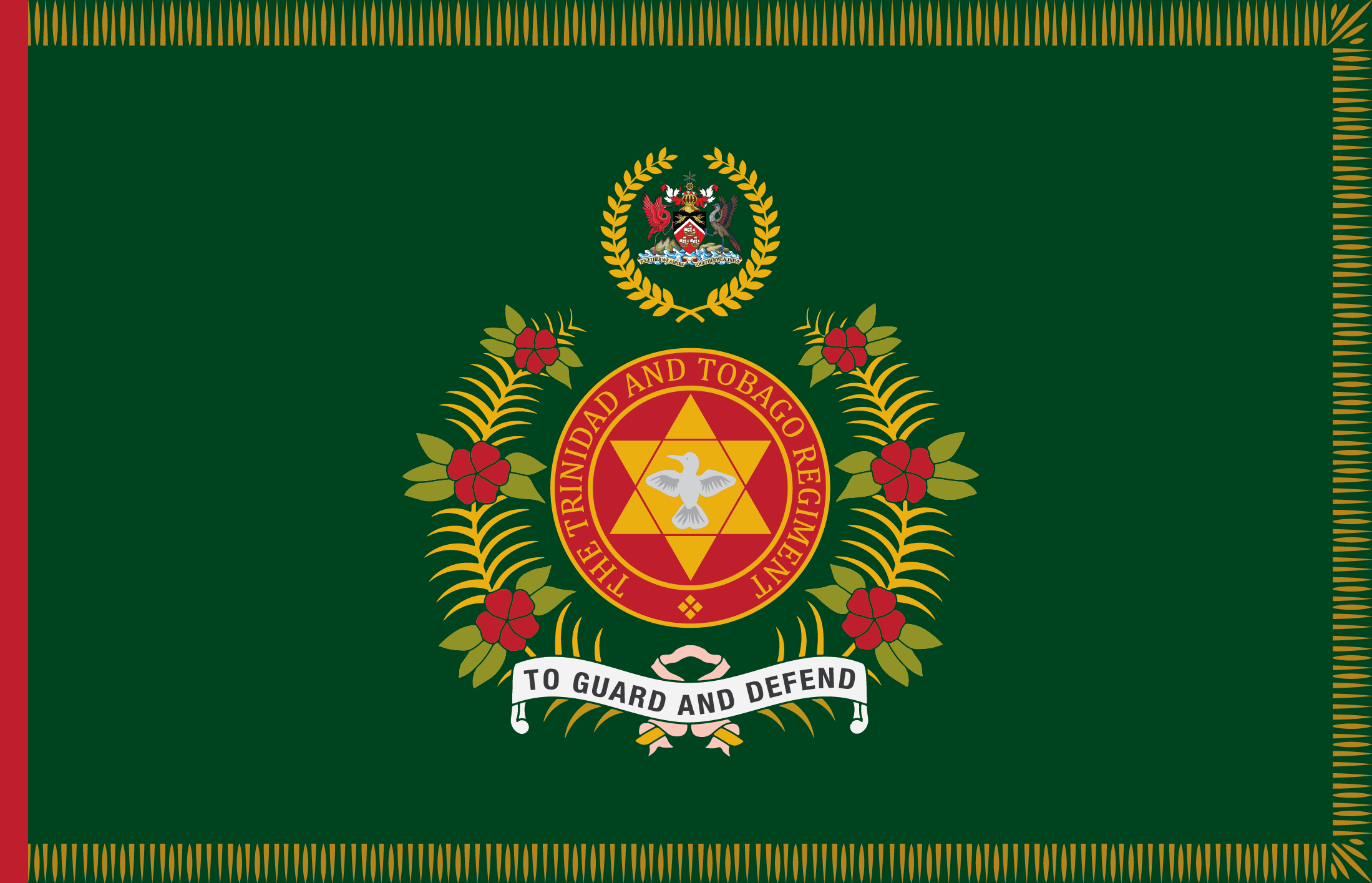
Regimental Colour of the Trinidad and Tobago Regiment

Although it is called the Trinidad & Tobago Regiment, the unit is in fact structured more like a light infantry brigade, with a pair of infantry battalions, plus engineering and logistic support units as well as a Headquarter and Special Forces Detachments:

- 1st Battalion: This is a regular infantry battalion. It is located at Camp Ogden, Long Circular Road, St James.
- 2nd Battalion: This a regular infantry battalion. Formerly located at Camp Mausica, since then it has been relocated to the Chaguaramas Heliport and was subsequently relocated to a new camp in La Romaine, Trinidad and Tobago.
- 1st Engineer Battalion: This provides engineering support. It is located at Cumuto Barracks, Wallerfield.
- Support and Services Battalion: This provides logistic and administrative support to the Regiment. It is located at Teteron Barracks, Teteron Bay, Chaguaramas.

The Regiment maintains a base at Camp Omega, also at Chaguaramas, used primarily for specialised training.

== Equipment ==
=== Infantry weapons ===
- (Belgium) Browning Hi-Power
- (Germany) Heckler and Koch USP 9mm handgun (75x)
- (Germany) Heckler & Koch HK417
- (Germany) Heckler & Koch HK416
- (Germany) Heckler & Koch G36
- (Germany) Heckler & Koch UMP
- (United States) Smith & Wesson M&P (1,500x)
- (United States) Smith & Wesson Model 36
- (Israel) IMI Uzi
- (Belgium) FN P90
- (Germany) H&K MP5
- (United Kingdom) Sterling L2A3 (178x)
- (United States) M16 (100x)
- (Israel) IMI Galil AR (1500x)
- (Israel) IWI Galil ACE
- (Belgium) FN FAL 50.00
- (United Kingdom) L1A1 SLR
- (Israel) IMI Negev
- (Israel) IMI Tavor TAR-21
- (Belgium) / (United Kingdom) FN MAG 60.20/L7A1
- (United Kingdom) Bren
- (United States) Saco M60 machine gun
- (United States) Browning M2HB
- (Israel) IMI B-300 82mm anti-tank rocket launchers (13x)
- (Sweden) Carl Gustav M2 84mm recoilless rifles (24x)
- (United Kingdom) L16A1 81mm medium mortar (6x)
- (France) Brandt 60 mm LR Gun-mortar

=== Ground vehicles ===
- (United Kingdom) Land Rover Defender
- (United Kingdom) Land Rover Defender with Armoured-Kit
- (United States) M35A1 trucks

=== Navy ===
- Patrol craft (6x)
- Fast Patrol boats (3x)
- Interceptor boats (6x)

=== Aircraft ===
==== Fixed wing aircraft ====
- (United States) Fairchild C-26 Metroliner (2x)

===== Helicopters =====
- (Italy) / (United Kingdom) AgustaWestland AW139 (4x)
- (United States) Sikorsky S-76A Spirit (4x)
- (Germany) MBB Bo 105CBS (4x)
- (France) (European Union) Eurocopter AS355 (1x)

== Ranks ==
The ranks employed by the Trinidad and Tobago Regiment:

Officers

Rank group	General / flag officers		Senior officers			Junior officers
Trinidad and Tobago Regiment
Trinidad and Tobago Regiment	Major general	Brigadier general	Colonel	Lieutenant colonel	Major	Captain	Lieutenant	Second lieutenant

Enlisted

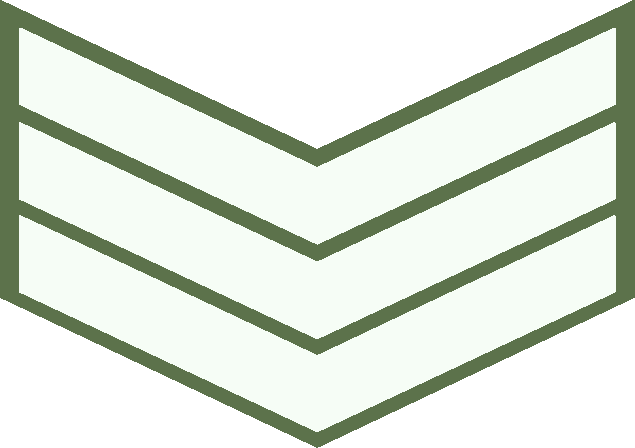
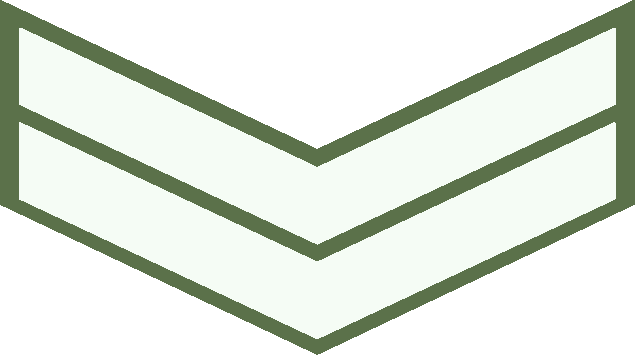
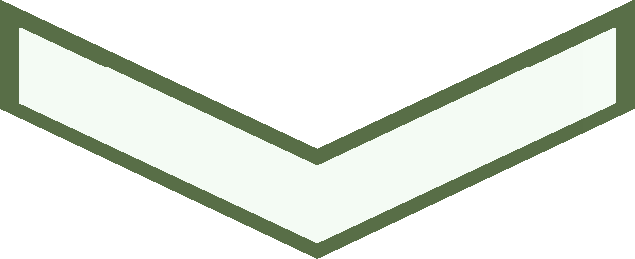
Rank group	Senior NCOs				Junior NCOs		Enlisted
Trinidad and Tobago Regiment							No insignia
Trinidad and Tobago Regiment	Warrant officer class 1	Warrant officer class 2	Staff sergeant	Sergeant	Corporal	Lance corporal	Private

== See also ==
- Chief of Defence Staff (Trinidad and Tobago)
- Trinidad and Tobago Police Service
- Ministry of National Security (Trinidad and Tobago)
- Barbados Regiment
- Royal Bermuda Regiment
