= St. Augustine (parliamentary constituency) =

Trinidad and Tobago parliamentary constituency

- Constituency for the Parliament of Trinidad and Tobago
- Electorate: 27,244 (2015)

Current constituency
- Created: 1961
- Number of members: 1
- Member of Parliament: Khadijah Ameen (UNC)

St. Augustine is a parliamentary electoral district in Trinidad and Tobago in the north of Trinidad. It has been represented since 2020 by Khadijah Ameen of the United National Congress.

== Constituency profile ==
The constituency was created prior to the 1961 general election. It borders D'Abadie/O'Meara, Arouca/Maloney, Tunapuna, Barataria/San Juan, Chaguanas West, La Horquetta/Talparo and Caroni East. The main towns are Piarco, Valsayn South, Curepe, Macoya, St Augustine and parts of Trincity and Tacarigua. It had an electorate of 27,244 as of 2015. It is considered a safe seat for the United National Congress although it was won by the Congress of the People in 2010 and 2015.

== Members of Parliament ==
This constituency has elected the following members of the House of Representatives of Trinidad and Tobago:

Election	Years	Member	Party	Notes
1961	29 December 1961 – 25 August 1966	Rudranath Capildeo	DLP	Also the Leader of the Opposition
1966	25 Nov 1966 - 22 April 1971	John Bharath	DLP	
1971	18 June 1971 – 19 June 1976	Ashraf Ali	PNM	
1976	24 September 1976 – 18 September 1981	Haffezar Khan	ULF	
1981	27 Nov 1981 - 29 Oct 1986	John Humphrey	ULF	
1986	12 Jan 1987 - 19 Nov 1991	John Humphrey	NAR	
1991	16 December 1991 – 10 December 2001	John Humphrey	UNC	
2001	10 December 2001 – 7 October 2002	Gerald Yetming	UNC	
2002	7 October 2002 – 5 November 2007	Winston Dookeran	UNC	
2007	5 November 2007 – 24 May 2010	Vasant Bharath	UNC	
2010	24 May 2010 – 10 August 2020	Prakash Ramadhar	COP	
2020	10 August 2020 – Present	Khadijah Ameen	UNC	

== Election results ==
=== Elections in the 2020s ===
2025 Trinidad and Tobago general election: St. Augustine
Party	Candidate	Votes	%	±%
UNC	Khadijah Ameen	12,664	73.6%	▲
PNM	Renuka Sagramsingh-Sooklal	3,865	22.5%	▼
PF	Daniel Maharaj	481	2.8%	Steady
NTA	Vera Dookie-Ramlal	129	0.8%	Steady
THC	Christopher Mathura	29	0.2%	Steady
Majority		8,799	51.1%	▲
Turnout		17,209	60.6%	
Registered electors		28,397		
UNC hold				

General election 2020: St. Augustine
Party	Candidate	Votes	%	±%
UNC	Khadijah Ameen	11,943	67.62	
PNM	Renuka Sagramsingh-Sooklal	5,264	29.80	
PEP	Sateesh Ramsaran	235	1.33	
COP	Carolyn Seepersad-Bachan	188	1.06	
THC	Michlin Hosein Phelps	33	0.19	
Majority		6,679	37.81	
Turnout		17,663	62.87	
UNC gain from COP		Swing		

=== Elections in the 2010s ===
General election 2015: St. Augustine
Party	Candidate	Votes	%	±%
COP	Prakash Ramadhar	12,606	65.92	
PNM	Alisha Shelley Romano	6,186	32.35	
NCT	Nalini Shoba Dial	331	1.73	
Majority		6,420	33.57	
Turnout		19,123	70.24	
COP hold		Swing		

General election 2010: St. Augustine
Party	Candidate	Votes	%	±%
COP	Prakash Ramadhar	15,271	79.19	
PNM	Balchandra Sharma	3,955	20.51	
Majority		11,316	58.68	
Turnout		19,284	75.38	
COP gain from UNC		Swing		
