= Terrence Deyalsingh =

Trinidad and Tobago politician

Terrence Deyalsingh is a Trinbagonian politician from the People's National Movement. He was MP for St. Joseph in the House of Representatives from 2013 until 2025. He was minister of health under Prime Ministers Keith Rowley and Stuart Young. Deyalsingh served as a senator between 2010 and 2013.

== Political career ==
Deyalsingh was a health minister during the COVID-19 pandemic in Trinidad and Tobago and was involved in the rollout of the COVID-19 vaccine in the country. During this time, he appeared on American talk show The Daily Show following the programme's coverage of the international attention surrounding false claims by singer Nicki Minaj on an acquaintance supposedly experiencing swollen testicles and impotence after receiving said vaccine. In September 2024, he was reportedly robbed at gunpoint in his constituency.

He was unseated in Aranguez/St Joseph in the 2025 Trinidad and Tobago general election by UNC candidate Devesh Maharaj.

== Electoral history ==
2025 Trinidad and Tobago general election: Aranguez/St Joseph
Party	Candidate	Votes	%	±%
UNC	Devesh Maharaj	9,908	57.1%	▲10.06
PNM	Terrence Deyalsingh	6,672	38.5%	▼13.08
PF	Anthony Darryl Dolland	350	2.0%	Steady
NTA	Gary Griffith	334	1.9%	Steady
THC	Marcus Ramkissoon	27	0.2%	Steady
Majority		3,236	18.6%	
Turnout		17,339	60.05%	
Registered electors		28,873		
UNC gain from PNM		Swing	11.57%	

== See also ==
- 12th Republican Parliament of Trinidad and Tobago
