= 2023 Trinidadian local elections =

- Monday, August 14, 2023

All 14 Municipal Corporation Electoral Areas
- Opinion polls
Turnout
30.3% (▼4.4 pp)
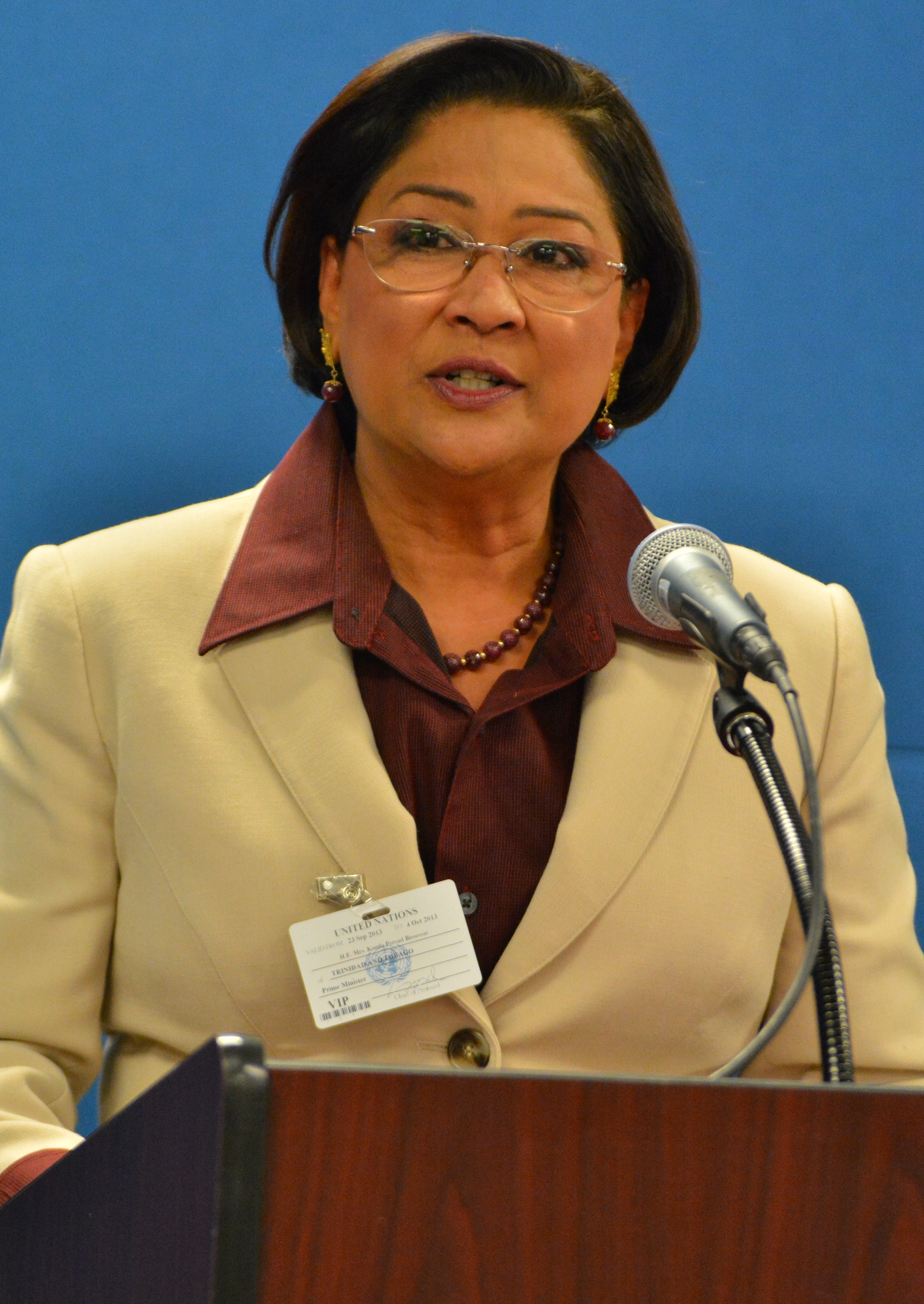

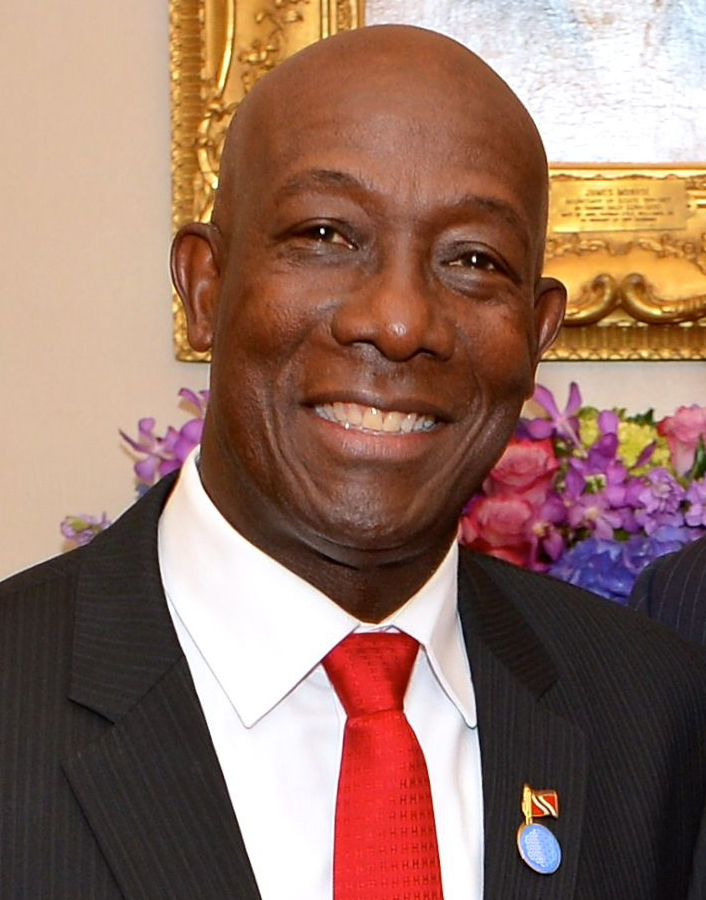
Leader	Kamla Persad-Bissesar	Keith Rowley
Party	UNC	PNM
Alliance	UNC/NTA
Leader since	24 January 2010	26 May 2010
Last election	67 councillors, 54.59% 7 municipal corporations	72 councillors, 43.60% 7 municipal corporations
Popular vote	173,961 52.51%	130,868 39.50%
Swing	▼2.08%	▼4.10%
Municipal Corporations	7 / 14	7 / 14
Municipal Corporations +/–	Steady	Steady
Councillors	70 / 141	70 / 141
Councillors +/–	▲3	▼2

The 2023 Trinidadian local elections were held on Monday, August 14, 2023, across all 41 electoral districts in Trinidad's 14 municipal corporation electoral areas. Both parties won control of seven of the 14 corporations.

The elections follow a 3-2 ruling on May 18, 2023, from the United Kingdom's Judicial Committee of the Privy Council, the Republic of Trinidad and Tobago's highest court of appeal, which stated that the government's one-year extension of the mandate of councillors and alderman was unlawful. The matter was brought before the Law Lords of the Privy Council by Ravi Balgobin Maharaj, and his legal team led by Anand Ramlogan, SC. The legal action taken by Ravi Balgobin Maharaj was necessary after the PNM government decided to extend the election by one year, which the Privy Council ruled was inconsistent with the rule of Democracy. The judgement handed down to Ravi Balgobin Maharaj by the Law Lords was a landmark ruling in the Commonwealth and marks the first time that a Court upheld the rights of citizens to vote in a Local Government Election.

The election also comes two years after the PNM's landslide loss in the December 2021 Tobago House of Assembly election, where the party was wiped out of office in the Tobago House of Assembly after two decades in power. Polls pointed to widespread rejection among the population for both the governing People's National Movement and the opposition United National Congress with both major parties and their leaders, Prime Minister Keith Rowley and Opposition Leader Kamla Persad-Bissessar being "extremely unpopular with unprecedented low approval ratings."

The Elections And Boundaries Commission (EBC) is yet to produce a map of the boundaries of all 141 electoral districts in Trinidad. With the exception of those areas that have had boundary changes, the seats up for election were last contested in the 2019 local elections. The number of electoral districts has increased from 139 to 141 with the creation of two new seats, Couva West/Roystonia in the Couva–Tabaquite–Talparo Regional Corporation and Mayaro North in the Mayaro–Rio Claro Regional Corporation and also 22 boundary changes in six other corporations: Chaguanas, Point Fortin, Couva–Tabaquite–Talparo, Penal–Debe, Siparia and Mayaro–Rio Claro. It i the first election since the establishment of regional corporations—Diego Martin and Siparia—as boroughs.

Since 1946, when the office of the mayor of the Port of Spain City Corporation was created, only men have officially served as mayor of the country's capital, despite voters in the last local elections electing a female majority city corporation slate in a historic first and the outcry from women's activists on the lack of gender equality with political parties in terms of a low number of nominations by parties of prospective female councillors and female aldermen. In 2019, both parties won control of seven of the fourteen corporations with the People's National Movement (PNM) losing their minority control status in the Sangre Grande Regional Corporation. The PNM won 72 of the then 139 electoral districts, but lost the popular vote and 11 electoral districts: Sangre Grande North West in the Sangre Grande regional corporation, Lengua/Indian Walk in the Princes Town Regional Corporation, Siparia West/Fyzabad in the Siparia Regional Corporation, Cocal/Mafeking in the Mayaro–Rio Claro Regional Corporation, Enterprise South/Longdenville North in the Chaguanas Borough Corporation, Caura/Paradise/Tacarigua in the Tunapuna–Piarco Regional Corporation, Les Effort West/La Romaine, Marabella West and Marabella West/Vistabella in the San Fernando City Corporation while gaining two from the United National Congress, in the San Juan–Laventille Regional Corporation, San Juan East and Barataria. The UNC also won the newly created districts of El Socorro/Aranguez North and La Fortune/Debe North, in the San Juan–Laventille and Penal–Debe Regional Corporation.

== Seats held prior to the election ==
The major political parties are defending the following numbers of electoral districts from municipal corporations on election day:

- People's National Movement (PNM) – 72 electoral districts from 7 municipal corporations
- United National Congress (UNC) – 67 electoral districts from 7 municipal corporations

These numbers are how many seats each party had won at the previous election, in 2019, rather than which party held the seat on the eve of the election.

== Eligibility to vote ==
All registered electors (Trinidadians and Tobagonians, Commonwealth and Non-Commonwealth citizens) who will be aged 18 or over, resided legally in Trinidad and Tobago and have resided in an electoral district/constituency for a least two months prior to the election date are entitled to vote in the local elections.

== Parties and standings ==
Political parties registered with the Elections and Boundaries Commission can contest the local elections.

Party	Founded	Ideology	Leader(s)	Leader since	Last election		At dissolution		Contested seats	Notes
Party	Founded	Ideology	Leader(s)	Leader since	Municipal Corporations	Electoral districts	Municipal Corporations	Electoral districts	Contested seats	Notes
Major party contesting all seats
People's National Movement (PNM)	1955	Liberalism, Social liberalism, Moderate nationalism	Keith Rowley	May 2010	7 / 14 (50%)	72 / 139 (52%)	7 / 14 (50%)	71 / 139 (51%)	141 seats	
UNC/NTA alliance
United National Congress(UNC)	1989	Social democracy, Third Way	Kamla Persad-Bissessar	January 2010	7 / 14 (50%)	67 / 139 (48%)	7 / 14 (50%)	66 / 139 (47%)	110 seats	
National Transformation Alliance (NTA)	2022	Social liberalism	Gary Griffith	April 2022	–	–	–	–	31 seats	
PEP/RFA alliance
Progressive Empowerment Party (PEP)	2017	Social democracy	Phillip Alexander	January 2017	–	–	–	–	48 seats	
Re-United Farmers Alliance (RFA)	2022	Agrarianism	Davica Thomas	April 2023	–	–	–	–	11 seats	
Minor parties not part of any alliance
Movement for Social Justice (MSJ)	2010	Social democracy, Socialism of the 21st century, Anti-imperialism, Labourism, Direct democracy	David Abdulah	January 2012	0 / 14 (0%)	0 / 139 (0%)	0 / 14 (0%)	0 / 139 (0%)	3 seats in Point Fortin	
Trinidad Humanity Campaign (THC)	2015	Social democracy	Marcus Ramkissoon	July 2015	–	–	–	–	4 seats	
Progressive Democratic Patriots (PDP)	2015	Labourism	Watson Duke	December 2015	–	–	–	–	17 seats	Has contested elections only in Tobago, first time contesting in Trinidad
The National Party (TNP)	2017		Valmiki Ramsingh	July 2017	–	–	–	–	1 seat, Les Efforts East Cipero in San Fernando	
Unity of the People (UTP)	2020		Nickocy Phillips	July 2020	–	–	–	–	1 seat in San Juan	Has only contested an election in Tobago, first time contesting in Trinidad

== Campaign slogans ==
Party	Slogan
People's National Movement (PNM)	Right people. Right reasons. Reform LG.
United National Congress (UNC)	Secure T&T.
National Transformation Alliance (NTA)	Believe. NTA is the way.
Progressive Empowerment Party (PEP)	We will fix it!
Re-United Farmers Alliance (RFA)	Time for real change. Pledge to feeding the nation
Movement for Social Justice (MSJ)	We represent Point!
Trinidad Humanity Campaign (THC)	Good governance is at your fingertips
Progressive Democratic Patriots (PDP)	People before politics. Putting people first.
The National Party (TNP)	You be the change!
Unity of the People (UTP)	Vote for change with a difference

== Opinion polls ==
The North American Caribbean Teachers Association (NACTA) which commissions opinion polling for elections in the region, sampling the electorates' opinions, has been criticized for not being quantitative and instead being qualitative by containing no statistical figures whatsoever and also for not publishing its methodology, with missing information such as sample size, how the sample is chosen and margin of error. The pollster has also been criticized for being outdated by not having a website where the full surveys can be accessible.

=== Municipal Corporation projections ===
Date	Pollster	Sample size	PNM	UNC	Other
14 August 2023	Local Election results	–	7	7	0
23 July 2023	NACTA	430	7	7	0
23 May 2023		Two UNC councillors resign			
6 December 2021		PNM faces a historic 14-1 loss in the December 2021 Tobago House of Assembly election; PNM ousted after 20 years in power			
25 January 2021		PNM loses the 2021 Trinidadian local by-elections and the January 2021 Tobago House of Assembly election			
2 December 2019	Local Election results	–	7	7	0

== Summary results ==
Elections are conducted under the first-past-the-post system. Preliminary results are shown below. Recounts are still ongoing.

Party	Party leader	Candidates	Councillors			% of councillors			Votes			% of Votes		
Party	Party leader	Candidates	2019	2023	+/-	2019	2023	+/-	2019	2023	+/-	2019	2023	+/-
United National Congress (UNC)	Kamla Persad-Bissessar	110	67	70		48.2%			202,584	173,961		54.59%	52.51%	
National Transformation Alliance (NTA)	Gary Griffith	31	-	0		-			-	15,997		-	4.83%	
UNC/NTA alliance total			67	70		48.2%			202,584	189,958		54.59%	57.34%	
People's National Movement (PNM)	Keith Rowley	141	72	70		51.8%			162,801	130,868		43.60%	39.50%	
Progressive Empowerment Party (PEP)	Phillip Alexander	48	-	0		-			-	5,930		-	1.79%	
Re-United Farmers Alliance (RFA)	Davica Thomas	11	-	0		-			-	1,041		-	0.31%	
PEP/RFA alliance total			-	0		-			-	6,971		-	2.10%	
Progressive Democratic Patriots (PDP)	Watson Duke	17	-	0		-			-	1,287		-	0.39%	
Trinidad Humanity Campaign (THC)	Marcus Ramkissoon	4	-	0		-			-	234		-	0.07%	
Movement for Social Justice (MSJ)	David Abdulah	3	0	0		0.0%			2,608	164		0.70%	0.05%	
Unity of the People (UTP)	Nickocy Phillips	1	-	0		-			-	110		-	0.03%	
The National Party (TNP)	Valmiki Ramsingh	1	-	0		-			-	45		-	0.01%	
Independents (IND)	N/A	6	0	0		0.0%			521			0.86%		
Total		373	139	141	▲2	100%	100%	Steady	373,437			100%	100%	Steady
Electorate: 1,091,936 Total votes: 331,300 Turnout:30.34 %

=== Results by municipal corporation electoral area ===
Municipal Corporation	Prior to election					Post election				
Municipal Corporation	Seats	Turnout	Control	PNM	UNC	Seats	Turnout	Control	PNM	UNC
Arima	7	33.29%	PNM	6	1	7		PNM	7	0
Chaguanas	8	38.05%	UNC	1	7	8		UNC	1	7
Couva–Tabaquite–Talparo	14	36.98%	UNC	0	14	15		UNC	0	15
Diego Martin	10	23.73%	PNM	10	0	10		PNM	10	0
Mayaro–Rio Claro	6	43.53%	UNC	1	5	7		UNC	1	6
Penal–Debe	10	39.92%	UNC	0	9	10		UNC	0	10
Point Fortin	6	34.74%	PNM	6	0	6		PNM	6	0
Port of Spain	12	24.40%	PNM	12	0	12		PNM	12	0
Princes Town	10	40.51%	UNC	0	10	10		UNC	0*	9*
San Fernando	9	35.72%	PNM	6	3	9		PNM	5	4
San Juan–Laventille	14	25.63%	PNM	12	2	14		PNM	11	3
Sangre Grande	8	42.02%	UNC	3	5	8		UNC	2	6
Siparia	9	41.92%	UNC	3	6	9		UNC	3	6
Tunapuna–Piarco	16	34.28%	PNM	11	5	16		PNM	11	5
All fourteen municipal corporations	139	34.71%		71	68	141			70	70
Source: Report of the Elections and Boundaries Commission on the Local Government Elections held on Monday, December 2, 2019

Municipal Corporation	Prior to election					Post election				
Municipal Corporation	Control	Councillors				Control	Councillors			
Municipal Corporation	Control	Total	PNM	UNC	Other	Control	Total	PNM	UNC	Other
Arima	PNM	7	6	1		PNM	PNM	7	0	
Chaguanas	UNC	8	1	7		UNC	UNC	1	7	
Couva–Tabaquite–Talparo	UNC	14	0	14		UNC	UNC	0	15	
Diego Martin	PNM	10	10	0		PNM	PNM	10	0	
Mayaro–Rio Claro	UNC	6	1	5		UNC	UNC	1	6	
Penal–Debe	UNC	10	0	10		UNC	UNC	0	10	
Point Fortin	PNM	6	6	0		PNM	PNM	6	0	
Port of Spain	PNM	12	12	0		PNM	PNM	12	0	
Princes Town	UNC	10	0	10		UNC	UNC	0*	9*	
San Fernando	PNM	9	6	3		PNM	PNM	5	4	
San Juan–Laventille	PNM	14	12	2		PNM	PNM	11	3	
Sangre Grande	UNC	8	3	5		UNC	UNC	2	6	
Siparia	UNC	9	3	6		UNC	UNC	3	6	
Tunapuna–Piarco	PNM	16	11	5		PNM	PNM	11	5	
Totals		139	71	68				70	70	

==== Allocation of Aldermen ====
	Prior to election				Post election				
Municipal Corporation	Aldermen				Aldermen				
Municipal Corporation	Total	PNM	UNC	Other	Total	PNM	UNC	NTA	Other
Arima	4	3	1		4	3	1	0	
Chaguanas	4	1	3		4	1	3	-	
Couva–Tabaquite–Talparo	4	1	3		4	0	4	-	
Diego Martin	4	3	1		4	3	0	1	
Mayaro–Rio Claro	4	1	3		4	1	3	-	
Penal–Debe	4	0	4		4	0	4	-	
Point Fortin	4	4	0		4	4	0	0	
Port of Spain	4	4	0		4	4	0	0	
Princes Town	4	1	3		4	1	3	-	
San Fernando	4	2	2		4	2	2	-	
San Juan–Laventille	4	3	1		4	2	2	0	
Sangre Grande	4	2	2		4	2	2	-	
Siparia	4	2	2		4	2	2	-	
Tunapuna–Piarco	4	2	2		4	2	2	0	
Totals	56	29	27		56	27	28	1	

For the Couva-Tabaquite-Talparo Regional Corporation the Aldermen appointed were Anil Kamal, Paul Bandoo, Lee Dharam-Singh and Wazim Dill Mohammed. Wazim Dill Mohammed was sworn in at the age of 25 making him one of the youngest Aldermen in the country's history to ever hold the position.

== See also ==
- 2022 People's National Movement internal election
- 2022 United National Congress internal election
- December 2021 Tobago House of Assembly election
- January 2021 Tobago House of Assembly election
- 2020 Trinidad and Tobago general election
- 2023 Guyanese local elections
