= Anand Ramlogan =

Legal advocate (born 1972)

Anand Ramlogan SC

Attorney General of Trinidad and Tobago
- In office 28 May 2010 – 2 February 2015
- Preceded by: John Jeremie
- Succeeded by: Garvin Nicholas

Personal details
- Born: August 26, 1972 (age 54) Ben Lomond, San Fernando, Victoria County, Trinidad and Tobago
- Party: United National Congress
- Spouse: Nalini Nanan
- Education: University of the West Indies; Queen Mary & Westfield College; University of Westminster
- Occupation: Attorney at Law, SC

Anand Ramlogan SC (born 26 August 1972) is a Trinidadian lawyer who served as Attorney General of Trinidad and Tobago from May 2010 to September 2015 under the People's Partnership administration, led by Prime Minister Kamla Persad-Bissessar. He was appointed following the People's Partnership coalition's victory in the 2010 Trinidad and Tobago general election, and was involved in governmental legal policy and public law litigation throughout his tenure.

After leaving office in 2015, Ramlogan returned to private legal practice and continues to work as a legal practitioner in Trinidad and Tobago.

== Early life and education ==
Anand Ramlogan was born on August 26, 1972, at Ben Lomond, Princes Town, in Trinidad and Tobago.

Ramlogan obtained his Bachelor of Laws (LLB) degree from the University of the West Indies at Cave Hill in Barbados. He later pursued postgraduate studies in the United Kingdom, earning a Master of Laws (LLM) with distinction in Public Law from the University of London.

== Legal career ==
Ramlogan is one of the founders and senior counselors of the Freedom Law Chambers in San Fernando, which handles constitutional and public interest litigation. He has practiced before the Privy Council and Caribbean Court of Justice, representing clients in constitutional and human rights litigation.

A member of the Honourable Society of the Middle Temple (U.K.), Ramlogan regularly appears in cases for or against the state in the superior courts, including the London-based final appellate court, the Privy Council. His recent cases in the Privy Council include:

- Maharaj v. The Cabinet of Trinidad (2023) UKPC 17, in which Ravi Balgobin Maharaj challenged the government's decision to postpone local government elections. The Judicial Committee of the Privy Council ruled against the government, forcing the Prime Minister to call the elections. The term of office of representatives came to an end in December 2023.
- JM v. The Attorney General (2022) UKPC 54 – This case concerned a teenage boy who was sexually abused for over five years while living in an industrial school and a psychiatric hospital, where he was wrongfully admitted on account of a genetic disorder. He was awarded a judgment sum of roughly 2 million TT$ for the breach of his constitutional rights; one million dollars for vindicatory damages and over $900,000 for compensatory damages - the largest sum ever awarded in a local case.
- Akili Charles v. The Attorney General (2022) UKPC – This case challenged a law that prohibited bail for murder suspects. In a unanimous decision, the Privy Council ruled that such a law was unconstitutional, thereby paving the way for persons accused of murder to apply for bail only in cases where the accused does not pose a threat to society.
- Akili Charles v. The Attorney General (2022) UKPC 49 – The state was ordered to pay the legal costs of a re-trial because it was the author of the "colossal misstep" that affected numerous prisoners who had been awaiting trial for over a decade.
- A&A Mechanical v. Petroleum Company of Trinidad (2022) – A commercial dispute that resulted in the national oil company having to pay millions of dollars to a local contractor. It is now a "leading case" on the law on "without prejudice" communications in the context of commercial negotiations.

== Private practice ==
Ramlogan has represented clients in human rights, constitutional, and public law cases, many of which have led to changes in Trinidad and Tobago law. He is admitted to practice in the British Virgin Islands (BVI), Saint Lucia, and Anguilla.

His recent legal work includes challenges to the appointment of Gary Griffith as Commissioner of Police, constitutional challenges to the Proceeds of Crime Act, and property tax legislation.

Ramlogan has appeared in over fifty Privy Council appeals and has also appeared before the Caribbean Court of Justice. He has worked on numerous cases in the High Court and Court of Appeal for breach of contract, defamation, discrimination, police brutality, medical negligence, personal injuries, and commercial law.

== Political and journalistic activities ==
Ramlogan has served on various committees and statutory bodies, including the Petroleum Company of Trinidad and Tobago, the Law Reform Commission, the Civil Aviation Authority, the Commission of Enquiry into the Administration of Justice, and the Vision 2020 plan for Constitutional Reform.

Anand entered politics as a candidate for the Congress of the People (COP) under the leadership of Professor Winston Dookeran. He contested the seat for the constituency of Tabaquite in 2007, but subsequently rejoined the United National Congress after Kamla Persad-Bissessar was elected political leader. He was then appointed as a government senator and Attorney General.

Before this appointment, Ramlogan was a lawyer who represented clients in constitutional and public interest litigation. He has also had many cases against the People's National Movement government for persons such as former San Fernando City Corporation CEO Marlene Coudray, Devant Maharaj, Feroza Ramjohn, George Daniel, and Damien Belfonte.

Ramlogan was also an active member of the media, hosted a radio talk show, and was a columnist with the Sunday Guardian, the Express, and the Newsday newspapers.

== Controversy ==
On 26 May 2010, two days after the success of the People's Partnership in the 2010 general election, Ramlogan was appointed a senator and Attorney General by Kamla Persad-Bissessar. During his tenure as Attorney General, he was associated with the implementation of Section 34 of the Administration of Justice (Indictable Proceedings) Act, which led to widespread public and political criticism after it was perceived to enable the early dismissal of corruption cases involving prominent businessmen.

In 2019, Ramlogan was charged with misconduct in public office. He maintained that he was the victim of a political conspiracy. The charges were eventually dropped by the DPP after it was discovered that millions of dollars had been secretly paid by the new PNM Government to the prosecution's lone witness as part of an undisclosed illicit indemnity agreement.
