= Devesh Maharaj =

Trinidad and Tobago politician

The Honourable Devesh Maharaj MP

Member of Parliament for Aranguez/St Joseph
- Incumbent
- Assumed office 3 May 2025
- Preceded by: Terrence Deyalsingh (Saint Joseph)

Personal details
- Party: UNC

Devesh Maharaj is a Trinidad and Tobago politician from the United National Congress (UNC). He has been MP for Aranguez/St Joseph in the House of Representatives since 2025.

== Career ==
Maharaj is an attorney. He has been active in the UNC since 1991. In the 2025 election, Maharaj unseated People's National Movement (PNM) MP Terrence Deyalsingh.

On 3 May 2025, Maharaj was appointed Minister of Justice, Minister in the Ministry of the Attorney General by Prime Minister Kamla Persad-Bissessar.

== Electoral history ==
2025 Trinidad and Tobago general election: Aranguez/St Joseph
Party	Candidate	Votes	%	±%
UNC	Devesh Maharaj	9,908	57.1%	▲10.06
PNM	Terrence Deyalsingh	6,672	38.5%	▼13.08
PF	Anthony Darryl Dolland	350	2.0%	Steady
NTA	Gary Griffith	334	1.9%	Steady
THC	Marcus Ramkissoon	27	0.2%	Steady
Majority		3,236	18.6%	
Turnout		17,339	60.05%	
Registered electors		28,873		
UNC gain from PNM		Swing	11.57%	

== See also ==
- 13th Republican Parliament of Trinidad and Tobago
