= Esmond Forde =

Trinidad and Tobago politician

The Honourable Esmond Forde MP

Member of Parliament for Tunapuna
- In office 7 September 2015 – 18 March 2025
- Preceded by: Winston Dookeran
- Succeeded by: Roger Alexander

Personal details
- Party: People's National Movement (PNM)

Esmond Irving Forde is a Trinidadian and Tobagonian politician representing the People's National Movement (PNM). He served as a Member of Parliament in the House of Representatives for Tunapuna from 2015 to 2025. He served as Deputy Speaker of the House until 2025.

== Early life ==
Forde attended Tunapuna Anglican School, Hillview College and St. Augustine Secondary School. He received a certificate in mass media and communications and photography from the University of the West Indies School of Continuing Studies, as well as a certificate in marketing and public relations from the London Chamber of Commerce & Industry.

He began work at the National Insurance Board in 1983, serving as public relations officer for education and publicity. He worked in management at Automotive Components Ltd, becoming manager of the services division until 2003. He worked as export sales executive at Lensyl Products Ltd from 2010 and 2013. He served previously on the board of directors for the Telecommunications Authority and the Eastern Credit Union.

== Political career ==
Forde was elected as a councillor for the Auzonville/Tunapuna region in 2010, a position that he held for five years. He was also vice-chairman of the Tunapuna–Piarco Regional Corporation. Forde was first elected as a Member of Parliament in the House of Representatives in the 2015 general election, succeeding Winston Dookeran of the Congress of the People (COP). He ran as the People's National Movement (PNM) candidate for Tunapuna against Wayne Munroe, the candidate for the United National Congress (UNC). He received 11, 228 votes, compared to the 7,613 votes received by Munroe. He was appointed as deputy speaker of the House of Representatives on 23 September 2015.

In the 2020 general election, Forde ran against David Nakhid, the UNC candidate. He filed his nomination papers on 17 July 2020, before the election on 10 August 2020. Forde received 9,409 votes to Nakhid's 7,613 votes, and retained his position as MP. He vowed to construct a road from Tacarigua to Tunapuna across the Caura River, to help young people in the area, and to increase the production of agriculture in Caura Valley and Mount St. Benedict.

Forde was re-elected as deputy speaker of the House on 28 August 2020. On 9 November 2020, he was appointed to the Human Rights, Equality and Diversity committee, the Social Services and Public Administration committee, and the Local Authorities, Service Commissions and Statutory Authorities committee. He also served on the joint standing committee on the Miscellaneous Provisions (Local Govt Reform) Bill, 2020.

In the 2025 Trinidad and Tobago general election, Monroe was unseated by UNC candidate Roger Alexander.

== Personal life ==
He is chairman of the Men's Ministry of the Reformation Life Centre Full Gospel Church and is on the executive of the Tunapuna Evangelical Association of Ministers.

== Electoral history ==
2025 Trinidad and Tobago general election: Tunapuna
Party	Candidate	Votes	%	±%
UNC	Roger Alexander	8,466	52.9%	▲
PNM	Esmond Forde	6,943	43.4%	▼
PF	Aleksei Henry	413	2.6%	Steady
NTA	Savita Pierre	127	0.8%	Steady
THC	Leshawn Gopee	28	0.2%	Steady
Majority		1,523	9.5%	
Turnout		16,016	58.27%	
Registered electors		27,485		
UNC gain from PNM		Swing	%	
