= Renuka Sagramsingh-Sooklal =

Trinidadian politician

The Honourable Renuka Sagramsingh-Sooklal Senator
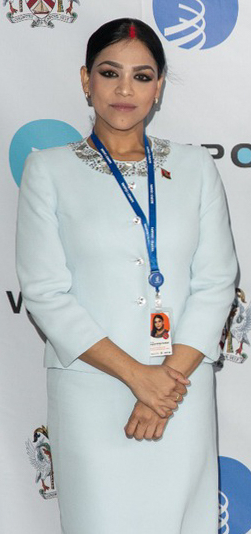
- At a meeting with Daren Tang in 2023

Member of the Senate of Trinidad and Tobago
- In office 19 August 2020 – 28 April 2025

Personal details
- Party: People's National Movement (PNM)
- Nickname: D' Sindoor Lady

Renuka Sagramsingh-Sooklal was a Trinidad and Tobago politician from the People's National Movement.

== Biography ==
Sagramsingh-Sooklal is a Hindu of Indo-Trinidadian descent. As an attorney she practiced primarily Family Law and Land Law. She unsuccessfully contested St. Augustine in the 2020 Trinidad and Tobago general election. She was a Senator and Minister in the Office of the Attorney General and Ministry of Legal Affairs.

She unsuccessfully contested St. Augustine in the 2025 Trinidad and Tobago general election.

== Electoral history ==
2025 Trinidad and Tobago general election: St. Augustine
Party	Candidate	Votes	%	±%
UNC	Khadijah Ameen	12,664	73.6%	▲
PNM	Renuka Sagramsingh-Sooklal	3,865	22.5%	▼
PF	Daniel Maharaj	481	2.8%	Steady
NTA	Vera Dookie-Ramlal	129	0.8%	Steady
THC	Christopher Mathura	29	0.2%	Steady
Majority		8,799	51.1%	▲
Turnout		17,209	60.6%	
Registered electors		28,397		
UNC hold				
