= Roger Alexander =

Trinidad and Tobago politician

The Honourable Roger Alexander MP

Member of Parliament for Tunapuna
- Incumbent
- Assumed office 3 May 2025
- Preceded by: Esmond Forde

Personal details
- Party: UNC

Roger Alexander is a Trinidad and Tobago politician who has served as Minister of Homeland Security since May 2025. A member of the United National Congress (UNC), he has been MP for Tunapuna in the House of Representatives since 2025. He was previously the senior superintendent in the Trinidad and Tobago Police Service.

== Pre-political career ==
Prior to becoming a politician, Alexander was co-host of the television program Beyond the Tape until 2024 and the former co-host of Crime Watch, alongside Ian Alleyne. Alexander was a senior superintendent in the Trinidad and Tobago Police Service until his resignation on March 26, 2025.

== Political career ==
Days after his resignation, Alexander was selected as the UNC candidate for Tunapuna during a campaign meeting in Sangre Grande on March 29, 2025.

He was elected for Tunapuna with a 52.86% share of the vote on a turnout of 58.27% in the 2025 general election held on April 28, 2025. He unseated incumbent Esmond Forde from the People's National Movement (PNM).

Alexander was appointed Minister of Homeland Security by Prime Minister Kamla Persad-Bissessar, and was sworn in on May 3, 2025 by President Christine Kangaloo during the swearing-in of the new cabinet.

== Electoral history ==
2025 Trinidad and Tobago general election: Tunapuna
Party	Candidate	Votes	%	±%
UNC	Roger Alexander	8,466	52.9%	▲
PNM	Esmond Forde	6,943	43.4%	▼
PF	Aleksei Henry	413	2.6%	Steady
NTA	Savita Pierre	127	0.8%	Steady
THC	Leshawn Gopee	28	0.2%	Steady
Majority		1,523	9.5%	
Turnout		16,016	58.27%	
Registered electors		27,485		
UNC gain from PNM		Swing	%	

== See also ==
- 13th Republican Parliament of Trinidad and Tobago
