= Aranguez/St. Joseph =

Trinidad and Tobago parliamentary constituency

Aranguez/St Joseph
- Constituency for the Parliament of Trinidad and Tobago
- St. Joseph is number 9 on this map
- Electorate: 27,653 (2015)
- Major settlements: Saint Joseph, Aranguez

Current constituency
- Created: 1956
- Number of members: 1
- Member of Parliament: Devesh Maharaj (UNC)

Aranguez/St Joseph is a parliamentary electoral district in Trinidad and Tobago. It was renamed from St. Joseph for the 2025 Trinidad and Tobago general election.

== Geography ==
It is based on the country's oldest town Saint Joseph. In 2025, the name was changed to incorporate the San Juan suburb of Aranguez. It had an electorate of 27,653 as of 2015.

== Members ==
St Joseph
| Election | Member | Party | Notes |
|---|---|---|---|
| 1956 | Kamaluddin Mohammed | PNM | |
| 1961 | Matthew Ramcharan | PNM | |
| 1966 | Frank Vincent Stephen | PNM | |
| 1971 | Frank Vincent Stephen | PNM | |
| 1976 | Shamshuddin Mohammed | PNM | |
| 1981 | Shamshuddin Mohammed | PNM | |
| 1986 | Carson Charles | NAR | |
| 1991 | Augustus Ramrekersingh | PNM | |
| 1995 | Mervyn Assam | UNC | |
| 2000 | Carlos John | UNC | |
| 2001 | Carlos John | UNC | |
| 2002 | Gerald Yetming | UNC | |
| 2007 | Kennedy Swaratsingh | PNM | |
| 2010 | Herbert Volney | UNC | |
| 2013 by-election | Terrence Deyalsingh | PNM | |
| 2015 | Terrence Deyalsingh | PNM | |
| 2020 | Terrence Deyalsingh | PNM | |
Aranguez/St Joseph
| 2025 | Devesh Maharaj | UNC | |

== Election results ==
=== Elections in the 2020s ===
2025 Trinidad and Tobago general election: Aranguez/St Joseph
| Party | Candidate | Votes | % | ±% |
|---|---|---|---|---|
| UNC | Devesh Maharaj | 9,908 | 57.1% | ▲10.06 |
| PNM | Terrence Deyalsingh | 6,672 | 38.5% | ▼13.08 |
| PF | Anthony Darryl Dolland | 350 | 2.0% | Steady |
| NTA | Gary Griffith | 334 | 1.9% | Steady |
| THC | Marcus Ramkissoon | 27 | 0.2% | Steady |
| Majority | | 3,236 | 18.6% | |
| Turnout | | 17,339 | 60.05% | |
| Registered electors | | 28,873 | | |
| UNC gain from PNM | | Swing | 11.57% | |
