= Richie Sookhai =

Trinidad and Tobago Senator

Member of the Senate of Trinidad and Tobago
- In office 18 January 2023 – 28 April 2025
- President: Christine Kangaloo; Paula-Mae Weekes
- Prime Minister: Keith Rowley
- Preceded by: Christine Kangaloo

President of the Chaguanas Chamber of Industry and Commerce
- In office 1 April 2021 – 18 January 2023
- Preceded by: Vishnu Charran
- Succeeded by: Baldath Maharaj
- In office 2014–2017
- Preceded by: Zamanath "Billy" Ali
- Succeeded by: Vishnu Charran

Deputy Chairman of InvesTT
- In office 2014–2015

Managing Director of Sookhai's Diesel Services Limited
- Incumbent
- Assumed office March 2001

Personal details
- Born: 7 March 1979 (age 47) Trinidad and Tobago
- Party: People's National Movement
- Education: College of Engineering and Computing, Florida International University (BS); College of Business, Florida International University (MIB)
- Profession: Politician; engineer; businessman

Richie G. Sookhai (born 7 March 1979) is a Trinidadian and Tobagonian politician, engineer and businessman. He served as a senator as Minister in the Ministry of Works and Transport

He was the president of the Chaguanas Chamber of Industry and Commerce (CCIC) prior to becoming a Government Senator. He is also the managing director of Sookhai's Diesel Services Limited.

He is a member of the ruling People's National Movement party and succeeded Christine Kangaloo as a Government Senator in January 2023, as she resigned to become President. His focus during his second term as chamber president was on small and medium-sized enterprises, the economic impact of the COVID-19 pandemic and educating entrepreneurs and business owners on digital media marketing. Sookhai is of Indo-Trinidadian descent. He was sworn in on the Bhagavad Gita. His maiden contribution in the Senate was The Firearms (Amendment) Bill, 2022. His appointment to the Senate by the PNM party leader and Prime Minister Keith Rowley was seen by political pundits as one of Rowley's best moves. They believe that Sookhai's popularity in Chaguanas, his family's Hindu religious roots there, and his clean track record will lead to Rowley selecting him as a candidate for the Chaguanas seat in the House in the next general elections to defeat the United National Congress. He obtained a Bachelor of Science in computer engineering from Florida International University College of Engineering and Computing in 2002 and he obtained his Master of International Business from Florida International University College of Business in 2020. He describes himself as a devout Hindu, a vegetarian, a teetotaler, a non-smoker, and an avid stamp and art collector. He has never been married and has no children.

== Electoral history ==
2025 Trinidad and Tobago general election: Chaguanas East
Party	Candidate	Votes	%	±%
UNC	Vandana Mohit	10,097	62.7%	▲
PNM	Richie Sookhai	5,317	33.0%	▼
PF	Afifah Mohammed	487	3.0%	Steady
NTA	Norman Dindial	125	0.8%	Steady
Independent	Ernesto Singh	47	0.3%	Steady
Majority		4,780	29.7%	
Turnout		16,110	58.10%	
Registered electors		27,728		
UNC hold				
