= Hillview College =

School in Tunapuna, Trinidad and Tobago

Location
- 1-5 College Road, El Dorado, Tunapuna 330236, Trinidad and Tobago

Information
- Type: Male Secondary School (Coed 6th Form)
- Motto: Latin: Humani Nihil Alienum (Literal: Nothing Concerning Humanity is Alien to Me)
- Established: January 17, 1955
- Principal: Derek Bissessar (Acting)
- Faculty: 60
- Enrollment: 860
- Campus: Suburban
- Colors: Maroon and Gold
- Affiliation: Presbyterian Board of Trinidad and Tobago

Hillview College is a government-assisted Presbyterian secondary school situated on the foothills of the Northern Range at the top of El Dorado Road in Tunapuna, Trinidad and Tobago. The motto Humani Nihil Alienum, which is adapted from a famous quotation from Roman African playwright Terence, means 'Nothing concerning humanity is alien to us'. Expressed in a positive way it means, 'I am interested in everything concerning mankind'.

Hillview is an all-boys school, however girls have been admitted to 6th Form since 1992. It is a seven-year school that prepares students for CSEC/O-Level Examinations at the 5th Form and CAPE/A-Level Examinations at the 6th Form. It offers education in the areas of the sciences, business studies and modern studies. In 2011, the Hillview College Senior Cricket Team swept all three titles in the InterCol Secondary Schools Cricket League.

== History ==
In July 1951, the official board of the Aramalaya Presbyterian Church appealed to the Presbyterian of the Canadian Mission Church for a boys' secondary school to be sited on Sheriff Street, Tunapuna.

Two years later, the Naparima College's board, which was governing only the Canadian missionary Secondary Boys' School in the country at the time, was instructed by the Presbytery to proceed with plans for a programme of secondary school expansion, giving priority to the oilfield area and the area in the vicinity of Tunapuna.

A committee of missionaries agreed to release buildings on Sheriff Street for use and on 27 September 1954, application was made to the Colonial Government for the recognition of a Provisional Assisted Secondary School in Tunapuna.

On Monday, 17 January 1955, the school was opened under the principalship of Rev. H. F. Swann. It was called Naparima College, Tunapuna Branch, with an enrollment of 44 students and two teachers. The church hall on Sheriff Street was used as the classroom and the portion of the grounds and cow-shed were used for games. The cow-shed was also used for teaching as a classroom.

Naparima College, Tunapuna Branch remained on this site until September 1957, when the Principal, staff and students entered the present site at the top of El Dorado Road. In November 1957, the government granted the college Permanent Status as a Government Assisted Secondary School. In 1962, the next principal, Dr. Stephen Moosai-Maharaj, renamed the school to Hillview College, gave it its motto, and composed the words for the college song.

In 1959, the science laboratories were built and the number of classrooms increased. In 1967, the main hall was extended to accommodate the increased number of staff, and an extension was made in 1996 to create offices for the administration and clerical staff. In 1986, a library was built and named in honour of Mr. Stephen R. Seepersad (Principal 1975-1988). In 1993, a 6th Form block was built, and in 1999, a pavilion was constructed and named in honour of Mr. Richard Kokaram (Principal 1989-1999).

In 2005, Amrik Singh Kochhar placed first in the world in Mathematics, Further Mathematics and fourth in Physics in the Cambridge A-level examinations, winning Hillview College their President's Gold Medal for the fourth time. Hillview continues to obtain scholarships in the CXC CAPE examinations.

In 2019, as a fifth-form student, Sanjeev Mahabir wrote SAT’S, SAT Subject Tests, Cambridge O-level examinations, Cambridge A-level examinations, CSEC, and CAPE all in one sitting. He received all grade I’s in the CSEC and CAPE examinations.

Hillview College is renowned for its cricket and football programs. In 2011, it became the first North East Zone school to win the PowerGen Secondary Schools Cricket League, and swept all other major competitions. The Hillview College football team, spearheaded by Mr. Sievan Siewsarran, is called the H.V.C. Spartans.

== Faculty ==
As a denominational school, Hillview College is under the jurisdiction of the Presbyterian Secondary Schools' Board of Education. The board, which is appointed every two years, oversees the progress and development of the five Presbyterian schools in the country. Hillview College has its own board of management that is responsible for the day-to-day management of the school. It approves the school budget, looks after other financial matters, and handles the maintenance of grounds and buildings.

Members of staff are appointed on the recommendation of the Presbyterian Secondary Schools' Board of Education.

There are five deans, a dean of studies, and ten heads of department who assist the principal and vice principal in the administration of the school.

A librarian and library assistant, four laboratory assistants, a bursar, a secretary, an office assistant, ten ancillary staff and four security guards complete the quota of staffing at Hillview College.

== The student council ==
As a means of training students to thrive within a democracy, Hillview College has founded its own internal "government", the student council. A school-wide election is carried out, in which the students vote digitally for a nominee of their choice for President, Vice President and Secretary. These positions are filled by members of Lower Six. Their role is to ensure that the needs and wants of the students are heard and further conveyed to the relevant authorities. Beyond this, however, each class holds an internal election to elect two class representatives. These representatives will then serve to present the issues of their class during the fortnightly Student Council meeting.

A rigid system of prefects has also been implemented. Like the student council heads, prefects must be members of Form Six. Every prefect is assigned to supervise a form class.

== Co/extracurricular activities ==
Hillview College's curriculum focuses on the holistic development of individuals. One of the ways by which this is achieved is through co-curricular and extra-curricular activities. A few of the most active clubs and organizations are listed below.

=== Astronomy club ===
The astronomy club was re-established in 2018 by students Ashvin Ramkissoon (President) and Samir Ali (Vice-President). It is currently headed by President and Captain, Ryker Harricharan. The club engages students with presentations and discussions about aerospace and space exploration. The club won the National Astronomy Quiz in 2016 and 2018. Hillview College has facilitated meetings of the Trinidad and Tobago Astro Club (TTAC) since 2019.

=== Hillview College Film and Photography Club ===
Founded in 2013, the Film and Photography Club has been one of the most popular, and well known aspects of Hillview. Within its time of existence, the Club has hosted five photography exhibitions and three film festivals. Its members have won awards nationally in recognition of their work, including Josiah Persad, whose short film ‘Sweat’ won the best short film and people's choice awards for the 2016 National Film Festival. The Club's activities focus on developing the creative digital arts of students and promoting the image of the school.

The Club is currently overseen by members of staff Mr. Stephen Bedase and Ms. Michelle Tappin-Davis.

=== Hillview Biological Organisation (HBO) ===
Founded in 2013, the Hillview Biological Organisation focuses on activities based on biology and social science. Students of the Club participate in various humanitarian exercises such as volunteering at animal shelters, assisting the dogs on campus, donating towards families in need in the Tunapuna area, and doing school cleanups.

HBO is currently overseen by member of staff Ms. Ria Rodriguez.

=== Hillview Journalism Society ===
Founded in 2014 by Dari Maharaj and Euan Ramnarine, and reinvigorated in 2019 by Dylan Kowlessar and Naveen Boodoo, is Hillview's Journalism Society. The activities of the club focus on documenting notable events of the school, as well as providing a forum for students to edit, grow, source, and harness report and aesthetic writing. The Club also features articles on fun facts and club activities.

Leading the Journalism Society is member of staff Mrs. Alana Ramlal.

=== Literary and Debating Society ===
Led by Co-Presidents Nathan Nancoo and Justin Sookdeo, the Literary and Debating Society aims to engage the students of Hillview College in healthy and productive debating, while sensitizing them to current events and pressing issues. The club's aim is to aid students in learning to express their views appropriately, as required in the workplace or any other public forum.

Leading this club is Mrs. Alana Ramlal.

=== HVC Engineering Team ===
Every year, accredited international engineering bodies, including IMechE and IStructE, host design and build competitions to give budding engineers various opportunities to explore the engineering field. The HVC Engineering Team showcase their talents in designing, and knowledge of form and function in these competitions. One notable achievement is 3rd Place School in the 2018 IMechE PCG Design and Build Competition, where students were required to construct a self-propelled vehicle.

This team is facilitated by members of staff Mr. Shane Baldeosingh, Mr. Ron Ramsingh and Mrs. Asha Parasram-Paltoo.

=== HVC Spartan Knights Chess Team ===
Members of the chess club undergo training to become a part of the team and earn the title of 'Spartan Knight'. Led by Captain Samir Ali (2018-2020), the team placed in several tournaments:

13th Annual Secondary Schools Chess Championship TT Chess Academy & Promotions & First Citizens Bank Secondary Schools Chess Championship: 2nd place school

SJC POS Secondary School Chess Tournament: 1st place school

First Citizens’ Bank (FCB) 14th Trinidad & Tobago (T&T) National Annual Secondary Schools Chess Championship: 2nd place school

This club is facilitated by member of staff Mr. Sievan Siewsarran and Coach Mr. Dev Soondarsingh.

=== HVC Spartan Swim Team ===
Hillview College has dominated the Secondary School arena in the field of competitive swimming. Since 2014, the HVC Spartan Swim Team has only once placed second at a swim meet.

The team is coached by ex-Hillview College teacher, Mr. Sterling Manchouk.

== Notable alumni ==
- Richard Kelly - Member of Trinidad and Tobago National Cricket Team
- Leon Romero - Member of Trinidad and Tobago and USA National Cricket Teams
- Carlyle Mitchell - Defender for Vancouver Whitecaps FC & Member of Trinidad and Tobago National Football Team
- Anthony Garcia - Former Minister of Education
- Esmond Forde - Member of Parliament for Tunapuna
- Kevin Ramnarine - Former Minister of Energy

== See also ==
- List of schools in Trinidad and Tobago
