= Muhammad Yunus Ibrahim =

Trinidadian politician

The Honourable Muhammad Yunus Ibrahim Senator
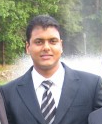

Member of the Senate of Trinidad and Tobago
- Incumbent
- Assumed office 11 June 2021

Vice President of the Senate of Trinidad and Tobago
- Incumbent
- Assumed office 22 March 2022
- Preceded by: Nigel De Freitas

Personal details
- Party: People's National Movement (PNM)

Muhammad Yunus Ibrahim is a Trinidad and Tobago politician from the People's National Movement.

== Career ==
Muhammad Yunus Ibrahim is a dental surgeon and businessman, and formerly served as president of the Supermarket Association of Trinidad and Tobago.

In 2021, Ibrahim was appointed a Senator. He is vice president. He holds a leadership role in the Parliament of Trinidad and Tobago.

In the 2025 Trinidad and Tobago general election, he was the PNM candidate in Barataria/San Juan.

== Electoral history ==
2025 Trinidad and Tobago general election: Barataria/San Juan
Party	Candidate	Votes	%	±%
UNC	Saddam Hosein	8,887	62.7%	▲10.0
PNM	Muhammad Yunus Ibrahim	4,742	33.5%	▼12.49
PF	Steffon Boodooram	365	2.6%	Steady
NTA	Da Vvian Bain	97	0.7%	Steady
All People's Party (Trinidad and Tobago)	Joshua Faline	37	0.3%	Steady
Majority		4,145	29.2%	
Turnout		14,164	56.24%	
Registered electors		25,183		
UNC hold				
