= Khadijah Ameen =

Trinidad and Tobago politician

Khadijah Ameen MP

Member of Parliament for St. Augustine
- Incumbent
- Assumed office 19 August 2020
- Preceded by: Prakash Ramadhar

Personal details
- Born: 9 May 1981 (age 45) Curepe, Trinidad and Tobago
- Party: United National Congress
- Children: 1
- Education: University of the West Indies

Khadijah Ameen is a Trinidadian and Tobagonian politician representing the United National Congress. She has served as a Member of Parliament in the House of Representatives for St. Augustine since the 2020 general election. She is the current deputy political leader of the UNC and Minister of Rural Development and Local Government.

== Early life ==
Ameen was born in Curepe but she grew up in Carapo. She attended St George's College and Arima Senior Comprehensive School. When she was seventeen, she became assistant secretary of the Evergreen Village Council, helping students with their homework, and organised a sports and youth group, the Evergreen Youth and Sports Group, from her house.

After graduation, she worked as a data entry clerk at the Unemployment Relief Programme and later worked in the data management department at the National Insurance Board until 2003. Ameen received her bachelor's degree in public administration at the University of the West Indies in 2010 and later graduated with a masters' of business administration in 2015. While completing her undergraduate degree, she served as the public relations officer for the university's Off Campus Renters Association.

== Political career ==
Ameen joined the United National Congress (UNC) when she was nineteen. She has held various roles in the party, including as the youth officer and as the social assistance coordinator, assistant office manager, and youth strategy officer for the constituency of Arouca North. She also worked as a campaign coordinator for the 2007 general elections and as a chairman for the UNC in the constituency of St. Augustine.

Ameen served as a local government councillor for ten years. In 2003, she ran to become councillor for the district of Valsayn/South Carapo at the age of twenty-one. While in this role, she was a consultant on the white paper for reform of the national youth policy. She also served as a member of the opposition committee on local government reform and the lead member of the opposition caucus of the Tunapuna–Piarco Regional Corporation.

In 2010, Ameen became the chairman of the Tunapuna–Piarco Regional Corporation at the age of twenty-eight, the youngest person to ever hold the position. She was the councillor for the St Augustine South/Piarco/St Helena local government district. She was the executive member of the Trinidad and Tobago Association of Local Government Authorities and chair of the sub-committee on education and training. The following year, she became the chairman of the women's arm of the UNC and a member of the national executive.

She contested the 2013 Chaguanas West by-election representing the UNC, where she was strongly supported by the UNC leader, Kamla Persad-Bissessar. She lost to Jack Warner of the Independent Liberal Party. She worked instead as an advisor to the Minister for Local Government from 2013 to 2015. Ameen was appointed as an opposition senator on 23 September 2015. She has served as the deputy political leader for the UNC since 2015.

She contested the St. Augustine constituency in the 2020 general election. Her campaign emphasised the issues of land regularisation, unemployment, crime, traffic, and flooding, as well as establishing an aircraft maintenance and repair hub at Piarco and a bio-technology manufacturing corridor. Ameen received 11,943 votes, compared to 5,264 votes for the People's National Movement’s candidate, Renuka Sagramsingh-Sooklal, who was her closest competitor. She is currently serving as the Shadow Local Government Minister for the UNC.

Ameen was re-elected in the 2025 Trinidad and Tobago general election. She was appointed Minister of Rural Development and Local Government by Prime Minister Kamla Persad-Bissessar.

== Personal life ==
Ameen is Muslim. She was married to Nigel Rostant for five years prior to their divorce. She has one child.

== Electoral history ==
2025 Trinidad and Tobago general election: St. Augustine
Party	Candidate	Votes	%	±%
UNC	Khadijah Ameen	12,664	73.6%	▲
PNM	Renuka Sagramsingh-Sooklal	3,865	22.5%	▼
PF	Daniel Maharaj	481	2.8%	Steady
NTA	Vera Dookie-Ramlal	129	0.8%	Steady
THC	Christopher Mathura	29	0.2%	Steady
Majority		8,799	51.1%	▲
Turnout		17,209	60.6%	
Registered electors		28,397		
UNC hold				

Political offices
Preceded by Prakash Ramadhar	Member of Parliament for St. Augustine; 2020–present	Incumbent
