= Barataria/San Juan =

Trinidad and Tobago parliamentary constituency

- Constituency for the Parliament of Trinidad and Tobago
- Barataria/San Juan is number 8 on this map
- Electorate: 25,529 (2015)
- Major settlements: Barataria, San Juan

Current constituency
- Created: 1986
- Number of members: 1
- Member of Parliament: Saddam Hosein (UNC)

Barataria/San Juan is a parliamentary electoral district in Trinidad and Tobago.

== Geography ==
It is based on the districts of Barataria and San Juan. It had an electorate of 25,529 as of 2015.

== Members ==
Election	Member	Party	Notes
1986	Kenneth Butcher	NAR	
1991	Linda Baboolal	PNM	
1995	Fuad Khan	UNC	
2000	Fuad Khan	UNC	
2001	Fuad Khan	UNC	
2002	Fuad Khan	UNC	
2007	Joseph Ross	PNM	
2010	Fuad Khan	UNC	
2015	Fuad Khan	UNC	
2020	Saddam Hosein	UNC	

== Elections ==
2025 Trinidad and Tobago general election: Barataria/San Juan
Party	Candidate	Votes	%	±%
UNC	Saddam Hosein	8,887	62.7%	▲10.0
PNM	Muhammad Yunus Ibrahim	4,742	33.5%	▼12.49
PF	Steffon Boodooram	365	2.6%	Steady
NTA	Da Vvian Bain	97	0.7%	Steady
All People's Party (Trinidad and Tobago)	Joshua Faline	37	0.3%	Steady
Majority		4,145	29.2%	
Turnout		14,164	56.24%	
Registered electors		25,183		
UNC hold				
