= Saddam Hosein =

Trinidad and Tobago politician

The Honourable Saddam Hosein MP

MP for Barataria/San Juan
- Incumbent
- Assumed office 19 August 2020
- Preceded by: Fuad Khan

Opposition Senator
- In office 29 September 2017 – 9 August 2020

Personal details
- Party: United National Congress (UNC)
- Education: University of the West Indies

Saddam Hosein is a Trinidad and Tobago politician from the United National Congress (UNC). He represents Barataria/San Juan in the House of Representatives and was the baby of the house of the 12th Republican Parliament. He was re-elected in the 2025 general election.

In May 2025, he was appointed Minister of Legal Affairs and Minister in the Ministry of Agriculture, Land and Fisheries by Prime Minister Kamla Persad-Bissessar.

== Electoral history ==
2025 Trinidad and Tobago general election: Barataria/San Juan
Party	Candidate	Votes	%	±%
UNC	Saddam Hosein	8,887	62.7%	▲10.0
PNM	Muhammad Yunus Ibrahim	4,742	33.5%	▼12.49
PF	Steffon Boodooram	365	2.6%	Steady
NTA	Da Vvian Bain	97	0.7%	Steady
All People's Party (Trinidad and Tobago)	Joshua Faline	37	0.3%	Steady
Majority		4,145	29.2%	
Turnout		14,164	56.24%	
Registered electors		25,183		
UNC hold				

== See also ==
- 12th Republican Parliament of Trinidad and Tobago
- 13th Republican Parliament of Trinidad and Tobago
