= Chaguanas East =

Trinidad and Tobago parliamentary constituency

- Constituency for the Parliament of Trinidad and Tobago
- Chaguanas East is number 21 on this map
- Electorate: 22,383 (2007); 23,653 (2010); 25,488 (2015)
- Major settlements: Chaguanas

Current constituency
- Created: 2007
- Number of members: 1
- Member of Parliament: Vandana Mohit (UNC)

Chaguanas East is a parliamentary constituency in Trinidad and Tobago. It was created in 2007 alongside Chaguanas West when the Chaguanas constituency was divided.

== Geography ==
The constituency contains the eastern areas of the town of Chaguanas. It had an electorate of 25,488 as of 2015.

== Members ==
Election	Member	Party	Notes
2007	Mustapha Abdul-Hamid	PNM	
2010	Stephen Cadiz	UNC	
2015	Fazal Karim	UNC	
2020	Vandana Mohit	UNC	
2025	Vandana Mohit	UNC	

== Elections ==
2025 Trinidad and Tobago general election: Chaguanas East
Party	Candidate	Votes	%	±%
UNC	Vandana Mohit	10,097	62.7%	▲
PNM	Richie Sookhai	5,317	33.0%	▼
PF	Afifah Mohammed	487	3.0%	Steady
NTA	Norman Dindial	125	0.8%	Steady
Independent	Ernesto Singh	47	0.3%	Steady
Majority		4,780	29.7%	
Turnout		16,110	58.10%	
Registered electors		27,728		
UNC hold				
