= Jill Lerner =

American architect

- Education: Cornell University College of Architecture, Art, and Planning (BArch, 1976)
- Occupation: Architect
- Employer: KPF
- Spouse: William Roy Bintzer (m. 1977)

Jill Nancy Lerner FAIA is an American architect who currently serves as the managing principal of Kohn Pedersen Fox.

== Family ==
Lerner's father, Arthur M. Lerner, was a vice president of Siemens in Iselin, New Jersey.

== Education ==
Lerner earned her Bachelor of Architecture degree from Cornell University College of Architecture, Art, and Planning in 1976.

== Career ==
=== Under Lerner's direction ===
- Chapman Graduate School of Business at Florida International University
- Huntsman Hall at the University of Pennsylvania's Wharton School of Business
- A facility building of New York University School of Law
- Oversaw Ross School of Business at the University of Michigan-Ann Arbor

== Positions held ==
Principal of Kohn Pedersen Fox Associates, PC. Ms. Lerner joined KPF in 1994 and is responsible for all aspects of the project and is the primary client contact during all phases - from initial programming and conceptual design through completion. (3) Principal at KPF, (2) she is responsible for all aspects of project management and design, and is the primary client contact during all phases—from initial programming and conceptual design through construction and project close-out.(1) Professional Practice to architecture students in Cornell’s New York City program.(1) responsible for overall direction of her projects from start to finish. Ms. Lerner has served on the Asian University for Women, Cornell University Board of Trustees (2004-2009)(2) President’s Council of Cornell Women and is past chair of the Cornell's College of Architecture, Art and Planning Alumni Advisory Council. Ms. Lerner is immediate past-president of the AIA New York(2) Trustee at Cornell University. She is an active member of the AIA and has served on the Board of Directors of the New York City chapter. She was a contributor and co-editor of Construction in Cities: Social, Environmental, Political and Economic Concerns, published by CRC Press in 2001. Ms. Lerner is licensed in New York and Pennsylvania. (3) She has had significant leadership roles at Cornell as a University Trustee, Chair of the Dean's Advisory Council for the College of Architecture Art & Planning, President's Council of Cornell Women, and Cornell University Council. Beyond Cornell, Lerner is on the President's Advisory Council of the College of Creative Studies in Detroit and chairs the Building Committee for the Asian University for Women, a new university in Bangladesh.(5)

== Buildings attributed ==
Chapman Graduate School of Business at Florida International University, Huntsman Hall at the University of Pennsylvania’s Wharton School of Business, and a new multi-use facility for New York University’s School of Law, Stephen M. Ross School of Business at the University of Michigan-Ann Arbor, and the Newman Vertical Campus mixed-use academic complex at City University of New York’s Baruch College. ed master planning efforts for several academic and research facilities, including the University of Chicago’s Graduate School of Business, the Walter B. Ford College for Creative Studies, and the Semel Institute and Center for Health Sciences at the University of California-Los Angeles.(1) Her projects include a mixed use facility at the City of New York's Baruch College in Manhattan; New York University's School of Law, New York City; a major expansion of the Children's Hospital of Philadelphia; a new campus for Amgen in Puerto Rico and an urban master plan for the United States Postal Service in Downtown Boston (3)

== Works ==
Work includes major projects for the Wharton School at the University of Pennsylvania in Philadelphia; the University of Maryland Medical Systems in Baltimore; The College of Creative Studies, Detroit, Michigan; Alvah S. Chapman Graduate School of Business at the Florida International University in Miami and the Stephen M. Ross School of Business at the University of Michigan in Ann Arbor. Following the World Trade Center disaster on September 11, 2001, she has co-chaired the New York New Visions Memorials Process team that is involved in research, outreach, temporary memorials and advocacy issues (3) recent work includes projects for NYU's new Shanghai campus, Michigan's Ross School in Ann Arbor, the Research Institute at Methodist Hospital in Houston, the Semel Institute of Neuroscience and Human Behavior at UCLA, and the Peking University School of Transnational Law in Shenzhen, China.(5)

== Personal life ==
She focused on "global city/global practice" and spoke frequently on women's leadership. (2) She has said her my own work, Baruch College Vertical Campus will always be a special project is her heart (2) She also pushes the idea of “resilient design” (4)

=== Affiliations ===
- Appointee of New York City Climate Advisory Board
- Fellow of American Institute of Architects New York Chapter, 2004
  - President - AIA New York Chapter, 2013
- Board member of Urban Green and Regional Plan Association
- Director of Urban Green Council
- Advisor of Cornell Atkinson Center for Sustainability Advisory Council at Cornell University
