= Avinash Singh =

Trinidad and Tobago politician (born 1989)

The Honourable Avinash Singh Senator

Member of the Senate of Trinidad and Tobago
- Incumbent
- Assumed office 10 December 2013

Minister in the Ministry of Agriculture, Land and Fisheries
- Incumbent
- Assumed office 19 August 2020

Personal details
- Born: 1989 (age 36–37)
- Party: People's National Movement (PNM)
- Education: Anglia Ruskin University; University of the West Indies

Avinash G. Singh (born 1989) is a Trinidad and Tobago politician from the People's National Movement.

== Education ==
Singh is a graduate of Anglia Ruskin University and the University of the West Indies.

== Career ==
Singh was a candidate in the 2013 Chaguanas West by-election. He came in third place behind Jack Warner and Khadijah Ameen. He was later appointed to the Senate.

Singh served as Minister in the Ministry of Agriculture, Land and Fisheries under Keith Rowley. As minister he advocated for the revitalisation of the coconut industry.

== Personal life ==
Singh is a Hindu and is married to Ria Ragoo-Singh.
