= Vandana Mohit =

Trinidad and Tobago politician (born 1990)

The Honourable Vandana Mohit MP

Member of Parliament for Chaguanas East
- Incumbent
- Assumed office 19 August 2020
- Preceded by: Fazal Karim

Personal details
- Born: 30 October 1990 (age 35)
- Party: UNC

Vandana Mohit (born 1990) is a Trinidad and Tobago politician from the United National Congress. She has been MP for Chaguanas East in the House of Representatives since 2020.

== Career ==
Mohit formerly worked at the Social Development Ministry. Mohit first became a councillor at the age of 21. In 2019, Mohit became Mayor of Chaguanas.

Mohit was re-elected in the 2025 Trinidad and Tobago general election. She was appointed Minister of the People, Social Development and Family Services by Prime Minister Kamla Persad-Bissessar.

== Electoral history ==
2025 Trinidad and Tobago general election: Chaguanas East
Party	Candidate	Votes	%	±%
UNC	Vandana Mohit	10,097	62.7%	▲
PNM	Richie Sookhai	5,317	33.0%	▼
PF	Afifah Mohammed	487	3.0%	Steady
NTA	Norman Dindial	125	0.8%	Steady
Independent	Ernesto Singh	47	0.3%	Steady
Majority		4,780	29.7%	
Turnout		16,110	58.10%	
Registered electors		27,728		
UNC hold				

== See also ==
- 12th Republican Parliament of Trinidad and Tobago
- 13th Republican Parliament of Trinidad and Tobago
