= Carson Charles =

Trinidad and Tobago politician

Carson Charles is a Trinidad and Tobago politician and former Minister of Works and Transportation. He is currently the political leader of the National Alliance for Reconstruction (NAR).

In the 1986 Trinidad and Tobago general election, Charles was elected in the St. Joseph constituency. After the resignation of A.N.R. Robinson as NAR leader in 1991 following defeat in the 1991 General Elections, Charles stepped in as party leader in 1992, but was replaced by Selby Wilson in 1993. He then went on to form the short-lived National Development Party, before contesting the St. Ann's East constituency on a United National Congress ticket in 2002. He then returned to the NAR, where in the capacity of deputy political leader he tried unsuccessfully to negotiate an agreement in the Democratic Action Congress before the 2005 Tobago House of Assembly elections.

On October 23, 2005 Charles was elected political leader of the NAR, replacing outgoing leader Lennox Sankersingh.

In December 2007, he was made a senator the Leader of the Opposition.

In July 2010, he was named as the President of National Infrastructure Development Company Limited (NIDCO).
