= Fuad Khan =

Trinidad and Tobago politician (born 1955)

Member of Parliament for Barataria/San Juan
- In office 6 November 1995 – 19 August 2020
- Preceded by: Linda Savitri Baboolal
- Succeeded by: Saddam Hosein

Personal details
- Born: 1 February 1955 (age 71) Port of Spain, Trinidad and Tobago
- Party: United National Congress
- Education: University of the West Indies

Fuad Khan (born 1 February 1955) is a Trinidadian and Tobagonian doctor and politician.

Fuad Khan first entered Parliament as the elected Member for Barataria/San Juan in 1995, a position he would retain on three subsequent occasions until 2007. Under the United National Congress administration, Khan was appointed Deputy Speaker of the 5th Republican Parliament (1995 to 2001) and Minister in the Ministry of Health returned as the representative for Barataria/San Juan and a Member of the 10th Republican Parliament. He was elected Deputy Speaker for a second occasion on Friday June 18, 2010. As of June 2011, Khan is a medical doctor specialising in urology.

== Portfolios held ==
Minister of Health, 28 June 2011 – 7 September 2015
Deputy Speaker, 18 June 2010 – 27 June 2011
Opposition Senator (Temporary), 28 July 2009 - 28 July 2009
Opposition Member, 17 October 2002 - 28 September 2007
Opposition Member, 5 April 2002 - 28 August 2002
Minister in the Ministry of Health, 12 January 2001 - 24 December 2001
Deputy Speaker, 27 November 1995 - 3 November 2000
