= COVID-19 pandemic in Trinidad and Tobago =

Ongoing COVID-19 viral pandemic in Trinidad and Tobago

- Disease: COVID-19
- Pathogen: SARS-CoV-2
- Location: Trinidad and Tobago
- First outbreak: Wuhan, China
- Index case: Trinidad
- Arrival date: 12 March 2020 (6 years, 7 months, 2 weeks and 2 days)
- Confirmed cases: 63865 (as of 17 November)
- Active cases: 7689 (as of 17 November)
- Recovered: 54285 (as of 17 November)
- Deaths: 1891 (as of 17 November)
- Fatality rate: 2.96% (as of 17 November)

Government website
- covid19.gov.tt

The COVID-19 pandemic in Trinidad and Tobago is part of the ongoing global viral pandemic of COVID-19, which was confirmed to have reached the Republic of Trinidad and Tobago on 12 March 2020.

== Background ==
On 12 January 2020, the World Health Organization (WHO) confirmed that a novel coronavirus was the cause of a respiratory illness in a cluster of people in Wuhan City, Hubei Province, China, which was reported to the WHO on 31 December 2019.

The case fatality ratio for COVID-19 has been much lower than SARS of 2003, but the transmission has been significantly greater, with a significant total death toll.

== Prevention efforts ==
Health Minister Terrence Deyalsingh, announced that Trinidad and Tobago had decided to implement restrictions on persons traveling from China. Persons who are living or who have visited China, will be barred from entering Trinidad and Tobago unless they had already been out of China 14 days prior to attempting to travel to Trinidad & Tobago. Travellers whose flights originate from Italy, South Korea, Singapore, Japan, Iran, Germany, Spain, and France are also to be restricted. On 16 March, Prime Minister Keith Rowley announced that the country will close its borders to everyone except Trinidad and Tobago nationals and health workers for the next 14 days. Additionally, bars were to be closed and the school closures extended until 20 April. The closure will come into effect by midnight on 17 March.

On 13 March, Rowley announced that schools and universities would be closed across the nation for one week due to the coronavirus fears. On 16 March, the closure was extended until 20 April.

On 15 March, Police Commissioner of T&T Gary Griffith said he would be going into self-quarantine.

Many Hindu associations cancelled Phagwa, Navratri, Ram Navami, and Hanuman Jayanti celebrations. Many other events were also cancelled or postponed.

Restrictions were put in place with regards to prisons nationwide. BPTT closed their offices in their response to the coronavirus. Deyalsingh said there were 3,000 test kits in Trinidad as of 16 March and 1000 more would be coming. Labour Minister Jennifer Baptiste-Primus announced that pandemic leave would be made available to workers with children. On 21 March, National Security Minister Stuart Young announced the closure of all borders to everyone (including nationals & non nationals) effective midnight on Sunday 22 March. He said no international flights would be allowed to enter the country. However, cargo vessels bringing food and pharmaceuticals into the country would be allowed entry.

On 6 April, Rowley extended the stay-at-home order to 30 April (later extended again to 10 May). He announced that until that date all restaurants would be closed, and several business such as supermarkets, bakeries, pharmacies and hardwares would have adjusted opening hours. He also said that people were to wear facemasks when in public, and that the government would work on distributing masks.

On 31 August, citizens were required by law to wear masks once they were out in public.

In May 2021, the twin island state was experiencing a third wave of COVID-19, and imposed a state of emergency with curfew from 9 p.m. to 5 a.m. with some exceptions to essential services including the energy sector, supermarkets, and pharmacies.

== Vaccines ==
In April 2021, Ministry of Foreign and CARICOM Affairs announced that it had received 40,000 doses of the Oxford–AstraZeneca COVID-19 vaccine (manufactured by the Serum Institute of India as Covishield) from India as part of the latter's Vaccine Maitri initiative. In June 2021, the US embassy to Trinidad and Tobago was widely mocked after it announced a donation of 80 vials of vaccines (totaling 400 doses) to a country with a population of 1.4 million.

Prime Minister Rowley announced mandatory vaccination for government employees in December 2021, though allowing medical exemptions.

== Criticisms of government accounts ==
Even though the first case of COVID-19 was formally diagnosed on March 12, 2020, and attributed to a traveler from Switzerland, there have been suspicions about the virus circulating locally before then. A visitor to Trinidad and Tobago who returned to Alberta, Canada, was formally diagnosed with the virus there in early March. The province's chief medical officer of health made the announcement on March 11, a day before the first case in Trinidad and Tobago.

On April 16, 2020, Kamla Persad-Bissessar, the former Prime Minister and current Opposition Leader, demanded that the government "come clean" about their testing capacity as well as the "true state of the coronavirus spread in Trinidad and Tobago."

== Statistics ==
=== New cases per day ===
View source data.

=== Deaths per day ===
View source data.

== Graphics ==
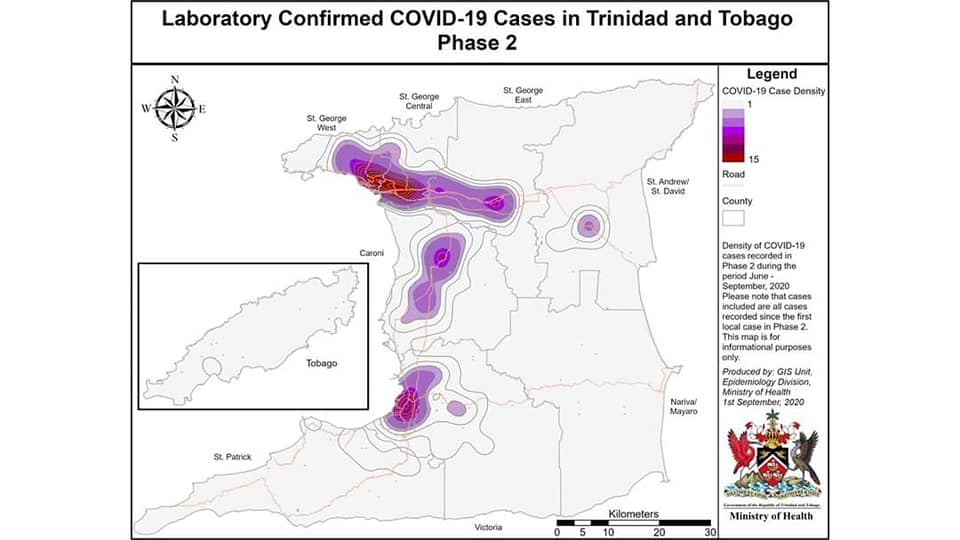
Density of COVID-19 cases recorded in Phase 2 (Sep 2020).

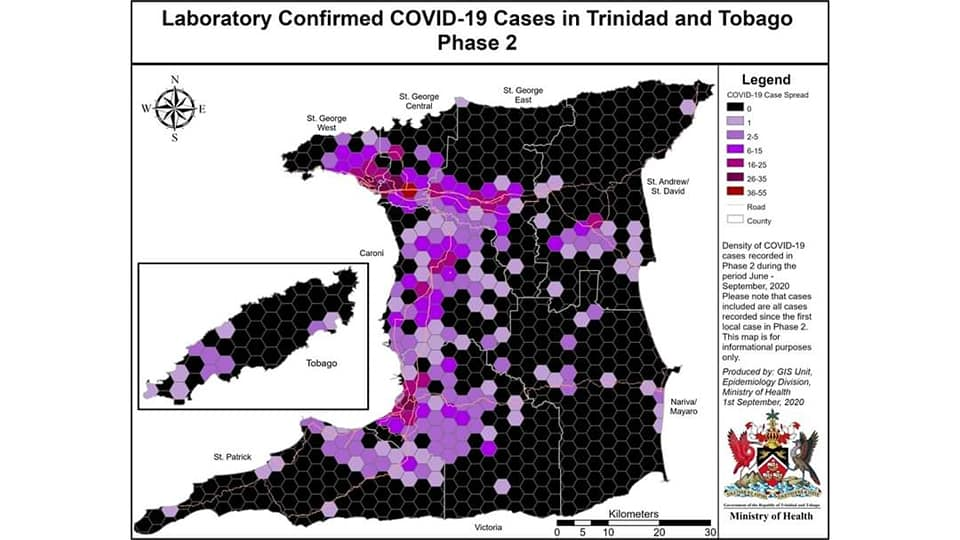
Locations where the COVID-19 cases were recorded.

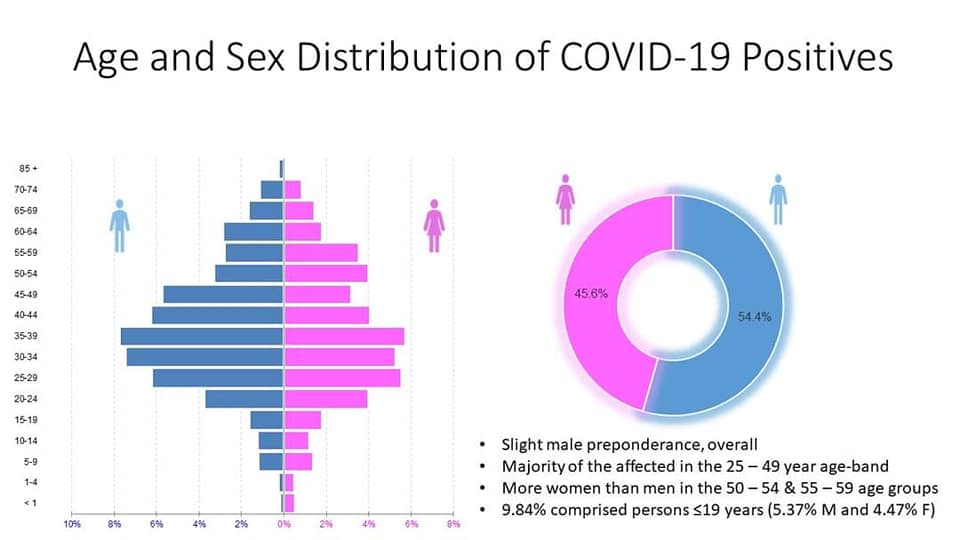
Age and Sex Distribution of COVID-19 Positive cases.

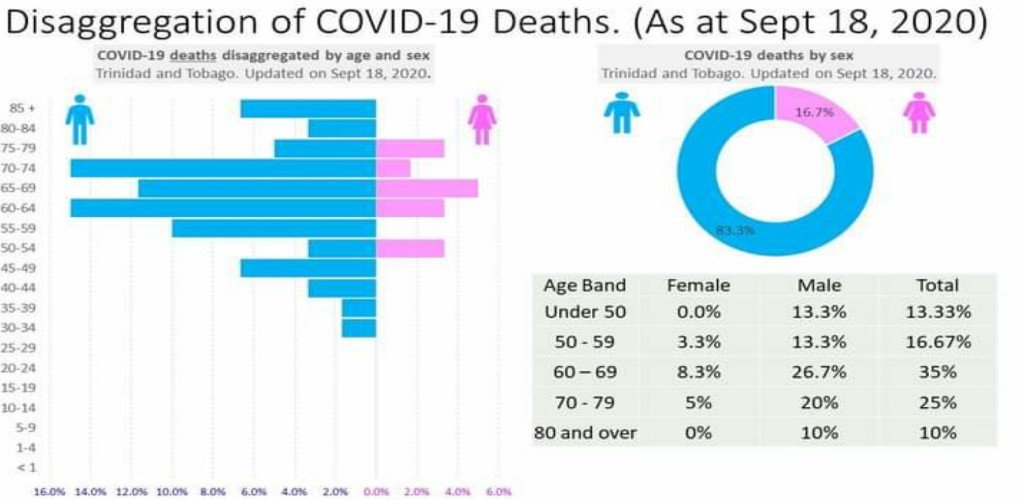
Age and Sex Distribution of COVID-19 deaths.

== See also ==
- COVID-19 pandemic in North America
- COVID-19 pandemic in Grenada
- COVID-19 pandemic by country
- Caribbean Public Health Agency
