= Tunapuna (parliamentary constituency) =

Trinidad and Tobago parliamentary constituency

- Constituency for the Parliament of Trinidad and Tobago
- Electorate: 26,650 (2015)

Current constituency
- Created: 1956
- Number of members: 1
- Member of Parliament: Roger Alexander (UNC)

Tunapuna is a parliamentary electoral district in Trinidad and Tobago. It has been represented since the 2020 general election by Esmond Forde of the People's National Movement (PNM).

== Constituency profile ==
The constituency was created prior to the 1956 general election. It had an electorate of 26,650 as of 2015. It is considered a marginal seat. Since the 2000 general election, the political party that has won the constituency has also won the general election.

== Members of Parliament ==
This constituency has elected the following members of the House of Representatives of Trinidad and Tobago:

Election	Years	Member	Party	Notes
1956	25 September 1956 – 4 December 1961	Learie Constantine	PNM	
1961	4 December 1961 – 24 May 1971	Alfred Thompson	PNM	
1971	24 May 1971 – 13 September 1976	Hector McClean	PNM	
1976	13 September 1976 – 9 November 1981	Bertie Fraser	PNM	
1981	9 November 1981 – 15 December 1986	John Scott	PNM	
1986	15 December 1986 – 16 December 1991	Emanuel Hosein	NAR	
1991	16 December 1991 – 11 December 2000	Edward Hart	PNM	
2000	11 December 2000 – 10 December 2001	Mervyn Assam	UNC	
2001	10 December 2001 – 5 November 2007	Edward Hart	PNM	
2007	5 November 2007 – 24 May 2010	Esther Le Gendre	PNM	
2010	24 May 2010 – 7 September 2015	Winston Dookeran	COP	
2015	7 September 2015 – 28 April 2025	Esmond Forde	PNM	
2025	28 April 2025 – Present	Roger Alexander	UNC	

== Election results ==
=== Elections in the 2020s ===
2025 Trinidad and Tobago general election: Tunapuna
Party	Candidate	Votes	%	±%
UNC	Roger Alexander	8,466	52.9%	▲
PNM	Esmond Forde	6,943	43.4%	▼
PF	Aleksei Henry	413	2.6%	Steady
NTA	Savita Pierre	127	0.8%	Steady
THC	Leshawn Gopee	28	0.2%	Steady
Majority		1,523	9.5%	
Turnout		16,016	58.27%	
Registered electors		27,485		
UNC gain from PNM		Swing	%	

General election 2020: Tunapuna
Party	Candidate	Votes	%	±%
PNM	Esmond Forde	9,460	54.75	
UNC	David Nakhid	7,533	43.60	
PEP	Maurice Downes	228	1.32	
THC	Marcus Ramkissoon	58	0.34	
Majority		1,927	11.15	
Turnout		17,279	62.99	
PNM hold		Swing		

=== Elections in the 2010s ===
General election 2015: Tunapuna
Party	Candidate	Votes	%	±%
PNM	Esmond Forde	11,228	59.42	
UNC	Wayne Munroe	7,613	40.29	
THC	Marcus Ramkissoon	55	0.29	
Majority		3,615	19.13	
Turnout		18,896	70.90	
PNM gain from COP		Swing		

General election 2010: Tunapuna
Party	Candidate	Votes	%	±%
COP	Winston Dookeran	10,446	55.97	
PNM	Esther Le Gendre	8,149	43.67	
Majority		2,297	12.31	
Turnout		18,662	74.08	
COP gain from PNM		Swing		
