= Ravi Balgobin Maharaj =

Political commentator and social activist (born 1984)

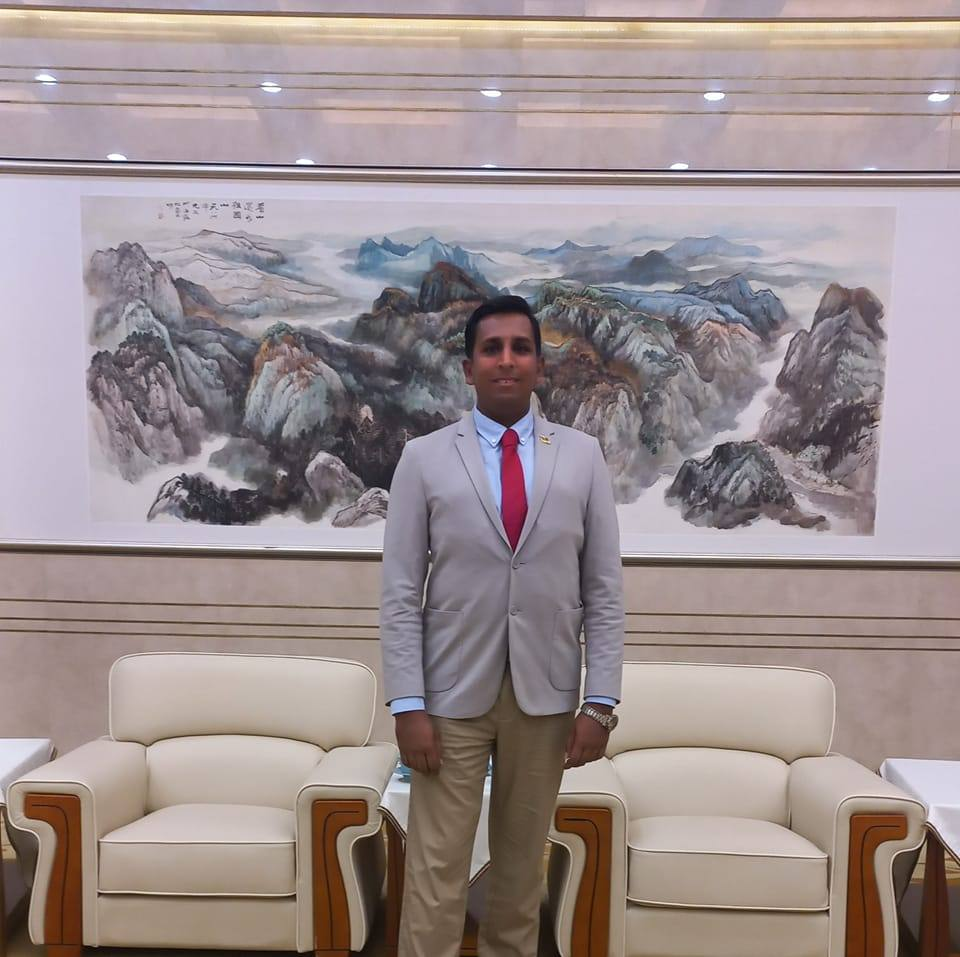
- Born: 16 November 1984 (age 41); Curepe, Trinidad and Tobago
- Occupation: International Syndicated Columnist
- Spouse: Nandita Sahadeo Maharaj (m. 2021)

Ravi Balgobin Maharaj (born 16 November 1984) is a political commentator and social activist in Trinidad and Tobago. He is known for initiating legal challenges concerning government actions, particularly in matters involving constitutional law and public administration.

Maharaj has been involved in several legal proceedings related to governance, constitutional issues, and civil rights. His court actions have challenged decisions of public authorities and government officials on questions of legality and constitutional compliance.

== Personal life ==
Ravi Balgobin Maharaj was born on 16 November 1984 in Curepe, Trinidad and Tobago, where he was raised by his grandmother, Radha Maharaj. In March 2010, he met Nandita Sahadeo Maharaj, whom he married in November 2021.

== Political Commentary ==
In 2013, Ravi Balgobin Maharaj began publishing commentary on political affairs in a number of local outlets in Trinidad and Tobago, writing on topics including democracy and governance. His commentary has since expanded in both scope and geography to now focus on issues such as transatlantic affairs, U.S. policy, and diplomatic relations across the Northern Atlantic and Western Hemisphere.

Maharaj has published opinion pieces and commentary in a number of international journals and media outlets, including Istituto Affari Internazionali the Trinidad Express, the Trinidad and Tobago Guardian, the St. Vincent Times, AZP News, the Indo-Caribbean Diaspora News, the European Times, The European Magazine, the DC Journal, Canadian Affairs, The Baltic Review, the Norfolk Daily News, the Las Vegas Sun and Forbes Magazine.

== Recognition by the U.S. Congress ==
On 5 February 2026, the U.S. House Committee on Appropriations published a press release written by Ravi Balgobin Maharaj entitled Outside Perspective: Disciplined and Focused American Foreign Policy. The press release discussed the enactment of the Fiscal Year 2026 National Security, Department of State, and Related Programs appropriations legislation, describing it as reflecting an "America First" and peace through strength approach to U.S. foreign policy. It stated that the legislation reduced overall spending by approximately US$9.3 billion while redirecting foreign assistance toward priorities including counterterrorism, counternarcotics, anti-trafficking initiatives, and efforts to counter the influence of the Chinese Communist Party. The press release also described the legislation as representing a more restrained and strategically focused U.S. approach to engagement in the Western Hemisphere.

== COVID-19 Pandemic ==
In 2020, Maharaj, through his attorneys, issued a pre-action protocol letter indicating his intention to challenge the government's stay-at-home regulations introduced during the COVID-19 pandemic in Trinidad and Tobago, arguing that aspects of the measures were inconsistent with constitutional rights and freedoms. Following the threatened legal action, the government amended the regulations governing restrictions on public movement.

In 2022, Maharaj again threatened legal action over COVID-19 public health regulations, arguing that restrictions preventing access to rivers for religious observances disproportionately affected members of the Hindu community. At the time, access to beaches had been restored while restrictions on rivers remained in effect. Following the threatened legal action, the government subsequently permitted access to rivers for religious purposes.

== Constitutional Litigation ==
Maharaj has been involved in a number of legal challenges concerning constitutional law, public administration, and the application of the Freedom of Information Act in Trinidad and Tobago. His litigation has produced several outcomes of national significance, among them a Privy Council ruling that led to the 2023 local government elections being held on schedule, a High Court ruling that invalidated the acting appointments of the Commissioner of Police and a deputy, and a series of FOIA decisions on the disclosure of information held by state bodies.

== Freedom of Information litigation ==
=== Petrotrin witness statements ===
In March 2016 Maharaj asked the state oil company Petrotrin under the FOIA for documents connected to an arbitration between Petrotrin and World GTL over the failed gas-to-liquids plant project. Petrotrin supplied the arbitration judgment but refused to release the witness statements filed in the proceedings. Maharaj's interest in them arose because they were relied upon by the British barrister Vincent Nelson QC in advice that led the State to discontinue a multi-million-dollar claim against Petrotrin's former executive chairman, Malcolm Jones.

His application for judicial review was unsuccessful in the High Court and the Court of Appeal. On 20 May 2019 the Privy Council allowed his appeal, holding that he had an arguable case and that, on the evidence available, there appeared to be some grounds for thinking that the State's decision to abandon the claim may have been influenced by political factors. The Prime Minister then said that he had instructed the Energy Minister to direct Petrotrin to release the statements, and in June 2019 Maharaj received two of the four statements he had sought, those of Charmaine Baptiste and Anthony Chan Tack; the statements of two other employees were not provided.

Commentators differed on the ruling's significance. One Trinidad Express article described it as a routine procedural decision rather than a landmark, while a Newsday column called it a victory for transparency.

=== Strategic Services Agency ===
In March 2017 Maharaj asked the Strategic Services Agency (SSA), the State's intelligence unit, how many communications interceptions it had carried out without judicial warrants in 2015 and 2016, and how many regional and international conferences and seminars its staff had attended. The SSA refused on national security grounds, and Maharaj brought judicial review proceedings. The litigation lasted several years. In February 2026 the Court of Appeal dismissed the SSA's appeal against the order requiring disclosure.

=== Ministry of Finance legal fees ===
In 2026 the High Court upheld a FOIA claim by Maharaj against the Ministry of Finance concerning legal fees paid by public bodies under its control and supervision between 2015 and 2022. The court ordered disclosure within a month and rejected the ministry's argument that the request could be refused because the information was not held in a single document.

=== Telecommunications Services of Trinidad and Tobago ===
In a further FOIA case, Maharaj successfully argued that the Telecommunications Services of Trinidad and Tobago (TSTT) is a public authority for the purposes of the Act.

== Local government elections (2023) ==
Local government elections were last held in Trinidad and Tobago on 2 December 2019. In July 2022 Parliament passed the Miscellaneous Provisions (Local Government Reform) Act 2022, which among other changes lengthened the terms of councillors and aldermen. The Government took the view that the change applied to incumbents, which extended their terms by a year and postponed the elections until 2024. Maharaj challenged that reading. In February 2023 the Court of Appeal ruled against him unanimously, holding that the constitutional right to vote applied to general elections and not local government elections.

On 18 May 2023, in Maharaj v The Cabinet of the Republic of Trinidad and Tobago [2023] UKPC 17, the Privy Council allowed his appeal by a 3–2 majority. The case turned on statutory construction and the principle of legality, and the Board held that the amendments did not extend the terms of incumbent councillors and aldermen, whose terms had expired in December 2022 and whose successors were due to be elected by March 2023. The Prime Minister subsequently announced that the elections would be held on 14 August 2023, and they took place on that date.

== Commissioner of Police appointments (2021) ==
The three-year term of Police Commissioner Gary Griffith ended on 17 August 2021, and the Police Service Commission appointed him to act in the post. In September 2021 Maharaj filed an interpretation summons in the High Court, with the Attorney General as defendant, arguing that section 123 of the Constitution required the commission to submit a list of nominees through the President to the House of Representatives for approval, for acting as well as substantive appointments.

In October 2021 Justice Nadia Kangaloo upheld the claim in a 58-page judgment. She declared the acting appointment of Griffith unconstitutional, and also invalidated the acting appointment of Deputy Commissioner McDonald Jacob, who had been appointed to act while Griffith was on leave. The ruling left the country temporarily without a Commissioner of Police for the first time since Independence, and a new acting appointment could proceed only after the commission had been reconstituted. The decision concerned the constitutional procedure for the appointments and made no finding about the conduct of the individuals concerned.

== Other proceedings ==
- 2015 general election polling hours. After the Elections and Boundaries Commission (EBC) extended polling hours by one hour on election day in the 2015 Trinidad and Tobago general election, Maharaj filed a FOIA request for records relating to the decision. Separate judicial review proceedings, in which Anand Ramlogan was involved, resulted in a High Court ruling that the EBC had acted outside its statutory authority.
- Witness statement and the Chief Justice (2015). In March 2015 Maharaj wrote to the Chief Justice asking for an investigation into how a witness statement relating to David West had been published on the Facebook page of Fixing TNT before it had been admitted into evidence. He cited Civil Proceedings Rule 29.1.4 and the Data Protection Act 2011, noting that the statement had been hosted using Dropbox on servers in the United States.
- Prohibited imports (2020). Maharaj successfully challenged a decision of the Comptroller of Customs and Excise relating to an expansion of the list of prohibited imports.
- Public procurement legislation (2023). Maharaj sent a pre-action protocol letter about amendments to the Public Procurement and Disposal of Public Property Act. Parliament subsequently reconvened and enacted amendments to the legislation.
