= National Freedom Party (Trinidad and Tobago) =

The National Freedom Party was a political party in Trinidad and Tobago. It contested the 1981 general elections, but received just 864 votes and failed to win a seat. The party did not contest any further elections.
