= West Indian Political Congress Movement =

The West Indian Political Congress Movement was a political party in Trinidad and Tobago. It contested the 1981 general elections, but received just 130 votes and failed to win a seat. The party did not contest any further national elections.
