= 2013 Chaguanas West by-election =

- July 29, 2013

Constituency of Chaguanas West
- Registered: 27,045
- Turnout: 67.66%
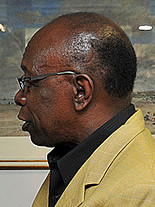
| | First party | Second party |
|---|---|---|
| | | UNC |
| Candidate | Jack Warner | Khadijah Ameen |
| Party | ILP | UNC |
| Popular vote | 12,642 | 5,130 |
| Percentage | 69.26% | 28.10% |
MP before election
Jack Warner
UNC
Elected MP
Jack Warner
ILP

A by-election was held in the Trinidad and Tobago constituency of Chaguanas West on July 29, 2013 following the forced resignation of Jack Warner just three months prior.

== Results ==
| Candidate | Party | Votes | % |
|---|---|---|---|
| Jack Warner | Independent Liberal Party | 12,642 | 69.26 |
| Khadijah Ameen | United National Congress | 5,130 | 28.10 |
| Avinash Singh | People's National Movement | 426 | 2.33 |
| Kirk Meighoo | Democratic National Assembly | 35 | 0.19 |
| Oliver Norman | National Coalition for Transformation | 21 | 0.12 |
| Total | | 18,254 | 100.00 |
| Valid votes | | 18,254 | 99.75 |
| Invalid/blank votes | | 45 | 0.25 |
| Total votes | | 18,299 | 100.00 |
| Registered voters/turnout | | 27,045 | 67.66 |
Source: EBCTT
