= Gerald Yetming =

Trinidad and Tobago politician and businessman

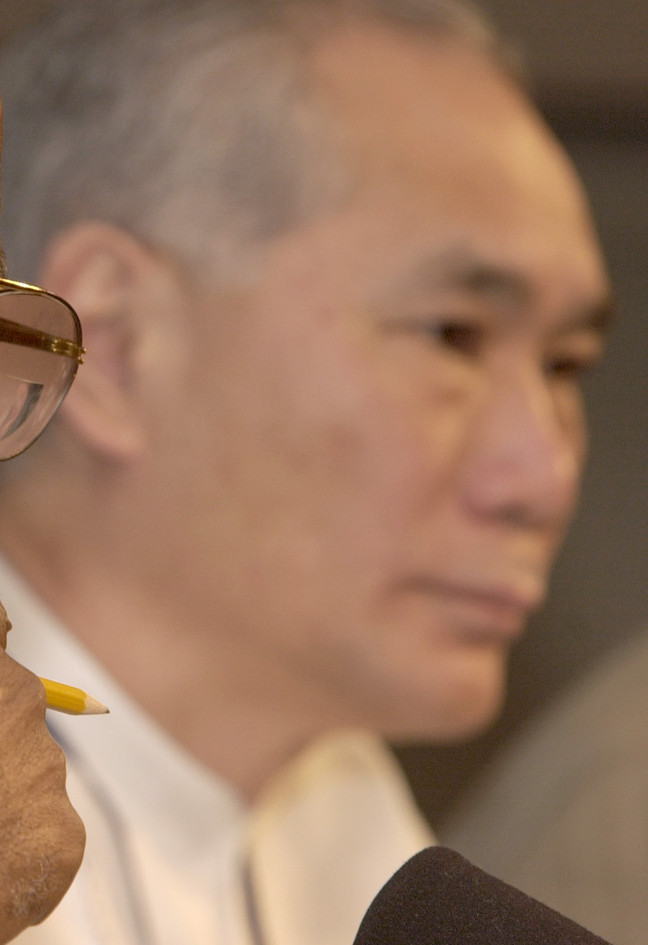
Gerald Yetming during his tenure as minister of finance in 2001

Gerald Yetming (葉明 born 4 January 1945) is a Trinidad and Tobago politician and businessman. Since 2002, he has been the member of parliament representing the constituency of Saint Joseph in the House of Representatives of Trinidad and Tobago for the opposition United National Congress (UNC). Prior to that he was a senator from 2000 to 2001, and minister of finance from 2000 to 2001.

A founding member of the Organisation for National Reconstruction, Yetming was the high commissioner to Canada between 1987 and 1989. Between 1964 and 2000, he worked for the Royal Bank of Canada and, later, its successor company, the Royal Bank of Trinidad and Tobago, retiring as group director – regional banking RBTT Financial Holdings Ltd.

Following the election of Winston Dookeran as UNC political leader in October 2005, Yetming announced that he no longer supported the former UNC politician leader Basdeo Panday as leader of the opposition and moved to the opposition back benches.

On 8 March 2006, Yetming officially resigned from the UNC party. He remained the MP for the Saint Joseph constituency and said that he would operate as an independent member of parliament.
