= Kenneth Butcher =

Trinidadian footballer (1948–2025)

Personal information
- Full name: Kenneth Butcher
- Date of birth: 15 January 1949 (age 77)
- Place of birth: Barataria, San Juan–Laventille, Trinidad and Tobago
- Position: Midfielder

Youth career
- Belmont Secondary

Senior career*
Years	Team	Apps	(Gls)
1968–1970	Queen's Park		

International career
1968	Trinidad and Tobago	3	(0)
- * Club domestic league appearances and goals

Kenneth Butcher (born 15 January 1949) is a retired Trinidadian footballer. Nicknamed "The Smooth", he played as a midfielder for Queen's Park throughout the late 1960s and early 1970s. He also represented his native Trinidad and Tobago for the 1970 FIFA World Cup qualifiers.

== International career ==
Butcher was first called up for Trinidad and Tobago on the second legged match against Guatemala on 20 November 1968 during the 1970 FIFA World Cup qualifiers. His other two matches were against Haiti on 23 and 25 November 1968 that resulted in an initial 4–0 defeat only to be followed with a 2–4 victory despite the Soca Warriors ultimately not qualifying for the 1970 FIFA World Cup.

== Later life ==
Since his retirement, Butcher had been serving as a National Technical Director until around the mid-2000s. He has also served as the Minister of Sport and currently works as a football analyst. He has notably been a sharp critic of the current Trinidad and Tobago Football Association's operations from their failures on the Soca Warriors being unable to qualify for both the 2026 FIFA World Cup and the 2027 FIFA Women's World Cup.

== Personal life ==
Kenneth was born into the Butcher family with his international career being the first athlete from the family to achieve national attention with his brother Noel also becoming a footballer in 1971. His sister Lyris also represented Trinidad internationally in field hockey in 1977. His son Nick Butcher has also represented the United States in field hockey at the 1966 Summer Olympics.
