= Vindicatory damages =

Type of legal damages

In common law legal systems, the term of art 'vindicatory damages' is a taxonomic label to describe a certain type of damages awarded by courts to individuals who have suffered a legal wrong.

Vindicatory damages are distinct from other forms of damages, as they are awarded for the primary purpose of recognizing and affirming the inherent value of legal rights held by an affected party. This may be contrasted with other forms of damages, such as compensatory damages, or punitive damages, which are awarded for a different purpose.

The concept of 'vindicatory damages' has been articulated by legal academics and practitioners as an explanation, or justification, for awards of damages in cases involving an award of damages that could not easily be rationalized by reference to principles such as compensation or deterrence. (Note: The Privy Council in Attorney General of Trinidad and Tobago v Ramanoop 2005 2 WLR 1324, articulated a 'vindicatory approach' for the purpose of rationalizing the constitutional damages formulation by Lord Diplock in Maharaj v Attorney General of Trinidad and Tobago (No 2) 1979 AC 385.)

== Jurisdictional approaches ==
For some jurisdictions, a 'vindicatory approach' has informed awards of damages in response to breaches of constitutional rights. This has been the case for both the Supreme Court of Canada in respect of the Canadian Charter, as well as the Constitutional Court of South Africa in respect of the South African Bill of Rights.

In other jurisdictions, such as Australia and the United Kingdom; apex courts have denied the applicability of vindicatory principles in the award of damages.

== Academic commentary ==
Jason Varuhas, a scholar of the common law has argued that vindicatory damages are a part of a long-standing tradition in common law legal systems; and criticized recent decisions by courts decline damage awards in some contexts as a 'deviation from orthodoxy'. In his book Damages and Human Rights, he has pointed to the struggles faced by court systems when attempting to rationalize damages awarded for breaches of bills of rights, and argues for courts to adopt a vindicatory approach modeled on the rules and principles applied in tort cases where basic rights are violated.
