= Florida International University College of Business =

Business school of Florida International University

Coordinates: 25.75752°N 80.37649°W

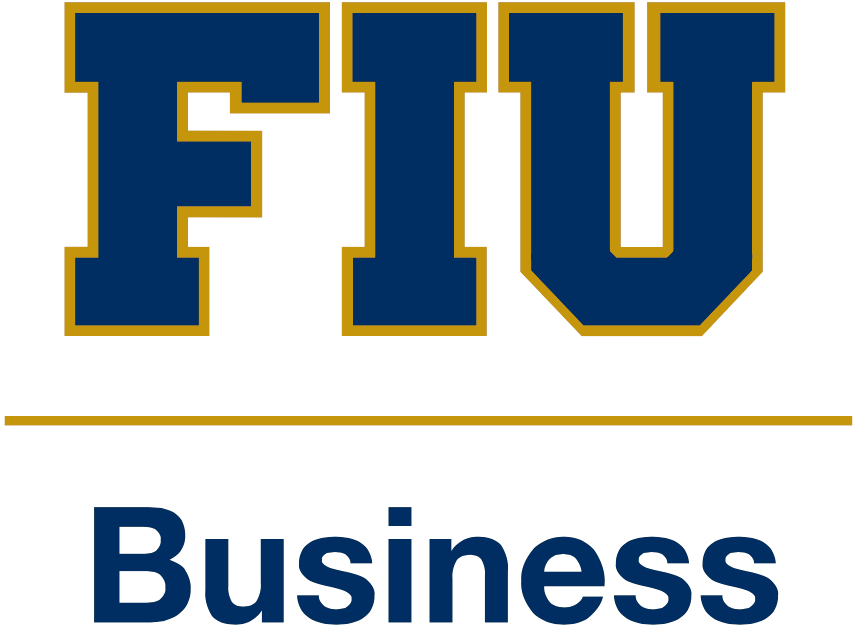
- Type: Public
- Established: 1965
- Dean: William G. Hardin III
- Students: 9,9415 (Spring 2022)
- Location: Miami, Florida, U.S.
- Website: business.fiu.edu

The Florida International University College of Business, also known as FIU Business, is the business school of Florida International University, a public R1 research university in Miami, Florida. The college includes the R. Kirk Landon Undergraduate School of Business and the Alvah H. Chapman Jr. Graduate School of Business.

The college and its School of Accounting are accredited by the Association to Advance Collegiate Schools of Business (AACSB).

== History ==
Florida International University was authorized by the Florida Legislature in 1965 and began operating under founding president Charles E. Perry in 1969. The university opened to students in 1972 on the site of the former Tamiami Airport in western Miami-Dade County. The College of Business opened the same year as one of FIU's founding academic units.

Originally known as the College of Business Administration, the college developed undergraduate, graduate, and executive education programs during FIU's early decades. In 2001, FIU formally named its graduate business school the Alvah H. Chapman Jr. Graduate School of Business, in honor of Miami business and civic leader Alvah H. Chapman Jr., a former chief executive officer of Knight Ridder and supporter of the university. At the time of its establishment, the Chapman Graduate School brought together the college's graduate and executive business programs, including MBA, specialized master's, graduate certificate, and doctoral programs.

In 2004, the undergraduate business school was officially named the R. Kirk Landon Undergraduate School of Business after R. Kirk Landon committed $5 million to the university. The College of Business is organized around the Chapman Graduate School of Business and the Landon Undergraduate School of Business.

== Campuses ==
FIU Business is based at Florida International University's Modesto A. Maidique Campus in southwest Miami and also offers programs at FIU Downtown on Brickell and FIU at I-75 in Miramar. At the Modesto A. Maidique Campus, the college occupies three main buildings: the College of Business Complex (CBC), Ryder Center (RC), and the Management and New Growth Opportunities (MANGO) building.

FIU Downtown on Brickell is located at 1101 Brickell Avenue in downtown Miami and houses graduate business programs for the Chapman Graduate School of Business. FIU at I-75 is located in Miramar and offers early morning, evening, weekend, and fast-track programs for working professionals.

The Department of Marketing and Logistics, Department of Finance, and Department of Information Systems and Business Analytics are housed in Ryder Center. The Department of International Business, Department of Global Leadership and Management, and School of Accounting are located in MANGO. MANGO also houses the college's undergraduate academic advising office.

The College of Business Complex houses offices and services associated with the Chapman Graduate School of Business, including graduate program offices and Business Career Management.

== Academics ==
The College of Business offers undergraduate, graduate, doctoral, and certificate programs in business-related fields. Undergraduate programs are offered through the Landon Undergraduate School of Business, while graduate programs are offered through the Chapman Graduate School of Business.

=== Undergraduate programs ===
The Landon Undergraduate School of Business offers:

- Accounting (BACC)
- Business Analytics (BBA)
- Finance (BBA)
- Human Resource Management (BBA)
- International Business (BBA)
- Information Systems (BBA)
- Logistics and Supply Chain Management (BBA)
- Management (BBA)
- Marketing (BBA)
- Real Estate (BBA)

=== Graduate programs ===
The Chapman Graduate School of Business offers MBA programs, specialized master's degrees, doctoral programs, and graduate certificates. MBA programs include the International MBA, Healthcare MBA, Professional MBA, Professional MBA Online, Executive MBA, MBA in Business Analytics, and MBA in Cybersecurity Management.

Specialized master's programs include accounting, finance, health informatics and analytics, human resource management, information systems, international business, international real estate, logistics and supply chain management, and marketing. Several graduate programs are offered in online or hybrid formats.

The college also offers doctoral study through the Ph.D. in Business Administration and the Doctorate in Business Administration. The Doctorate in Business Administration is a three-year program designed for working professionals and is offered as a track under the Ph.D. degree.

== Centers and Institutes ==
FIU Business houses several centers, institutes, and experiential learning initiatives connected to research, entrepreneurship, real estate, supply chain management, international business, sales, financial literacy, small business development, and business technology. These include the Center for International Business Education and Research (CIBER), the Eugenio Pino and Family Global Entrepreneurship Center, the Global Sales Center, the Ryder Center for Supply Chain Management, the Florida Small Business Development Center at FIU Business, the Tibor and Sheila Hollo School of Real Estate, the Jerome Bain Real Estate Institute, the Capital Markets Lab, the Truist FIU Financial Wellness Clinic, the ATOM Think Tank Experiential Learning Programs, and the Business Innovation and Growth Accelerator program.

== Rankings and Accreditation ==
FIU Business and its School of Accounting are accredited by the Association to Advance Collegiate Schools of Business (AACSB). The college's Healthcare MBA program is accredited by the Commission on Accreditation of Healthcare Management Education (CAHME). FIU's Master of Science in Health Informatics & Analytics is accredited by the Commission on Accreditation for Health Informatics and Information Management Education (CAHIIM).

FIU's undergraduate international business program was ranked No. 3 in the United States by U.S. News & World Report in 2025.

In the 2026 U.S. News & World Report graduate rankings, FIU's International MBA was ranked No. 5 among public universities and No. 11 nationally. FIU Business's online master's in business programs, excluding MBA, were ranked No. 1 in Florida by U.S. News & World Report in its 2026 Best Online Programs rankings.

QS ranked FIU's Online MBA No. 10 globally and No. 5 in the United States in its 2026 Online MBA rankings. QS also ranked FIU's master's programs No. 6 in the United States for supply chain management and No. 9 for marketing in 2026.

FIU's online Master of Science in International Real Estate was ranked No. 1 in the United States among online real estate master's programs by Forbes Advisor in 2026. The same FIU release reported that the Real Estate Academic Leadership rankings placed FIU first globally for real estate research productivity for 2021 to 2025.

FIU's Master of Science in Human Resource Management has been ranked No. 1 in the United States multiple times by HR.com. FIU's undergraduate and graduate human resource management programs were ranked No. 1 by HR.com in 2019.

In 2025, FIU received the CAHME/Canon Award for Excellence in Sustainability in Healthcare Management Education and Practice.

== Deans ==
- Joyce Elam, 1997–2012
- David Klock, 2012–2014
- Jose Aldrich, interim, 2015–2017
- Joanne Li, 2017–2021
- William G. Hardin III, 2021–present
