= Gary Griffith =

Former commissioner of the Trinidad and Tobago Police Service

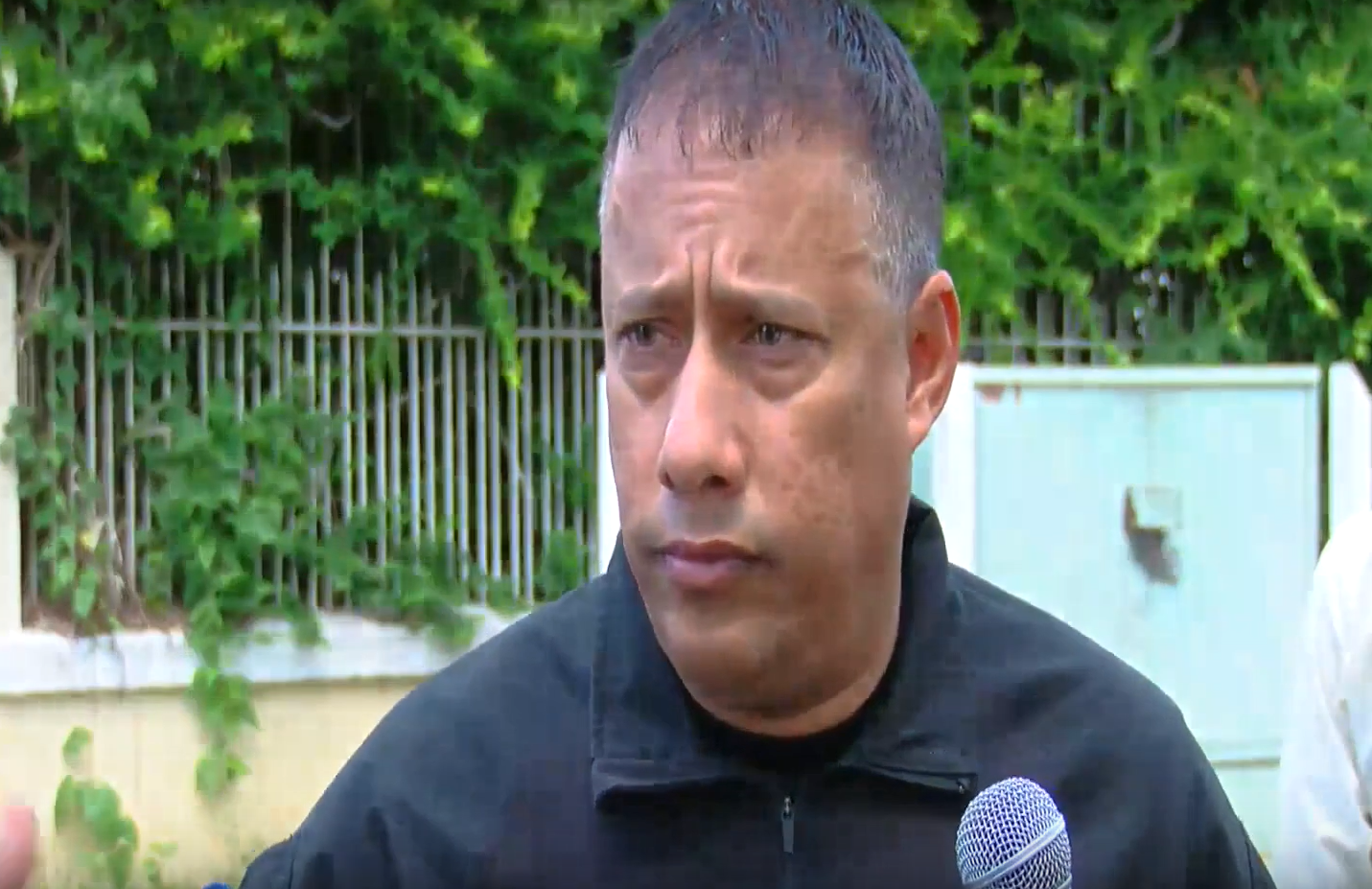
- Gary Griffith speaking in 2019

Commissioner of Police
- In office 6 August 2018 – 15 September 2020

Minister of National Security
- In office 6 September 2013 – 2 February 2015

Personal details
- Party: National Transformation Alliance

Gary Griffith is a former commissioner of the Trinidad and Tobago Police Service, serving between August 2018 to August 2021 Under the previous government, led by a coalition including the party currently in Opposition, he had been appointed as Minister of National Security in Trinidad and Tobago on Friday 6 September 2013.

Between May 2010 and September 2013, he served as National Security Advisor to the Prime Minister. Griffith was a member of the Trinidad and Tobago Defence Force for 15 years, where he attained the rank of captain in 1998. He retired his Commissioned Officer position in May 2005. This attainment to the rank of captain was achieved after just six years service, which was an unprecedented achievement. He was the first military officer from this country to return home with a United Nations Peacekeeping Medal. He received the Efficiency decoration medal [EDM] for 12 years distinguished service and the Meritorious medal for duties performed during the 1990 attempted coup in the Republic of Trinidad and Tobago.

== Education and early career ==
Gary Griffith attended St. Mary's College from 1976 to 1984. After completing his Advanced Level studies, he began a career in the Military, and was enlisted on 1 June 1988. Griffith is the holder of a MSc in Security Management from the Department of Criminology in the University of Leicester, United Kingdom. As can be noted from his achievements and experience, his managerial capabilities is not limited to security alone but also General Management, Public Relations, Protocol, Event Management and Human Resources to name a few.

== Military career ==
1988–1990

In 1988, Gary Griffith enlisted into the Regiment and was immediately Commissioned by His Excellency the President Noor Hassanali to the rank of Second Lieutenant. After undergoing an intensive one year recruiting training programme in Trinidad, he was selected to attend the prestigious and world-renowned Royal Military Academy Sandhurst in Surrey, England, where he attended a one-year Platoon Commander's Course in England, Wales and Cyprus. After successfully completing the course, he was also awarded the Brunei Award.
1990–1995

From 1990 to 1995, after returning to Trinidad and Tobago, he held several levels of command, including Platoon Commander, Detachment Commander, Company Second in Command, and Adjutant. In 1990, he was actively engaged in Operations during the Attempted Coup in Trinidad and Tobago, to ensure that democracy was maintained and upheld.

1995–1999

In 1995, he was appointed as the aide to the Chief of Defence Staff under Brigadier General C Alfonso. He remained in this position from 1995 to 1999, under both Brigadier General C Alfonso [1995–1999], and Commodore A. Franklin [1999]. In 1998, he was promoted to captain, after just six years' service, which was an unprecedented achievement. He was then appointed Administrative, Finance, Welfare and Logistics Officer for over 300 troops from the CARICOM Forces that participated in the United Nations Mission in Haiti.

The United Nations Peacekeeping Mission was a six-month tour of duty. It was Trinidad and Tobago's first-ever deployment of troops to participate in a peacekeeping operation under the United Nations. At the end of a successful tour of duty, he was the first-ever military officer from this country to return home with a United Nations Peacekeeping Medal.

== Law enforcement career ==
On 6 August 2018, the Police Service Commission of Trinidad and Tobago announced the appointment of Gary Griffith as the new commissioner of police of the Trinidad and Tobago Police Service. Mr. Griffith received his letter of appointment on Friday 3 August 2018, as the new commissioner from Ms. Bliss Seepersad, chairman of the Police Service Commission.

== Political affiliations ==
In September 2000, Captain Griffith was personally requested by the prime minister of the Republic of Trinidad and Tobago, the Honourable Basdeo Panday, to be reassigned to work directly with the prime minister, initially as the Comptroller of the Prime Minister's Residence. He was appointed as the military attaché to the prime minister, whereby Captain Griffith acquired several other responsibilities. His role became similar to that of the aide de camp to the president. Hence, he was also required to accompany the prime minister at most of his engagements.

He was previously an acting senator for the Opposition and the advisor for two Opposition parties on National Security matters. From 2004 to 2006, he was the security adviser to the political party the United National Congress. From 2006 to 2010, he was the security adviser to the political party Congress of the People, when he was appointed as the National Security Adviser. In 2013, under the People's Partnership, Gary Griffith was appointed National Security Minister, becoming the fourth person to hold the critical post, since the People's Partnership Government took power in 2010. In 2022, Gary Griffith formed a new political party, the National Transformation Alliance (NTA).

== Removal from office ==
On 2 February 2015 the former Minister of National Security, Gary Griffith and former attorney general Anand Ramlogan were revoked of their appointment to office under request by former prime minister of Trinidad and Tobago Kamla Persad-Bissessar, along with a call for resignation from the former director of the Police Complaints Authority (PCA) David West, following their roles in a witness-tampering investigation, ordered by acting police commissioner Stephen Williams.

The former prime minister also revoked the appointments of former senate president Timothy Hamel-Smith, former sports minister Rupert Griffith, former Ministry in the Works and Transport Minister Stacy Roopnarine, former minister in the National Security Ministry Embau Moheni, and former justice minister Emmanuel George. Persad-Bissessar had also given up the portfolio of Social Development and People Ministry. Griffith was succeeded by retired brigadier general Carlton Alfonso, who held the position as Minister of National Security until the general elections of 2015, in which the People's National Movement was elected into government.

The allegations started when former director of the Police Complaints Authority (PCA) David West, signed a statement in which he claimed that the former attorney general Anand Ramlogan had asked the director of the PCA to withdraw a witness statement he had made in a defamation matter against the Opposition Leader at the time. Ramlogan denied the allegation, and an investigation was launched by the Trinidad and Tobago Police Service. Shortly following, it was alleged that Gary Griffith, upon the advice of Anand Ramlogan, telephoned the director of the PCA to query whether or not he had withdrawn the witness statement in question.

The former minister later confirmed that such a call had taken place. On the night of 2 February 2015, the former prime minister addressed the public and press on the matters surrounding the investigation, in which she stated, "While I am not in a position to determine neither guilt nor innocence in this matter, it is of grave enough consequence to warrant serious consideration and immediate action." This was followed by stating that a request had been made to former president Anthony Carmona for the immediate removal of former attorney general Anand Ramlogan and former minister of national security Gary Griffith, along with the removal of former senate president Timothy Hamel-Smith, former sports minister Rupert Griffith, former Ministry in the Works and Transport Minister Stacy Roopnarine, former Minister in the National Security Ministry Embau Moheni, and former justice minister Emmanuel George.

The former prime minister subsequently requested the appointment of the former minister of legal affairs Prakash Ramadar to also serve as the minister of justice, Christine Hosein as Minister of the People and Social Development, Brent Sancho as Minister of Sport, Kwasi Mutema as Minister in the Ministry of National Security, Garvin Nicholas as Attorney General, and retired brigadier general Carlton Alfonso as Minister of National Security.

== Electoral history ==
2025 Trinidad and Tobago general election: Aranguez/St Joseph
Party	Candidate	Votes	%	±%
UNC	Devesh Maharaj	9,908	57.1%	▲10.06
PNM	Terrence Deyalsingh	6,672	38.5%	▼13.08
PF	Anthony Darryl Dolland	350	2.0%	Steady
NTA	Gary Griffith	334	1.9%	Steady
THC	Marcus Ramkissoon	27	0.2%	Steady
Majority		3,236	18.6%	
Turnout		17,339	60.05%	
Registered electors		28,873		
UNC gain from PNM		Swing	11.57%	
