= 1981 Trinidad and Tobago general election =

General election in Trinidad and Tobago

- 9 November 1981

All 36 seats in the House of Representatives 19 seats needed for a majority
- Turnout: 56.43%
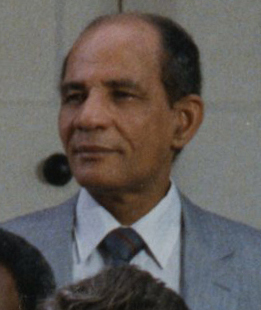

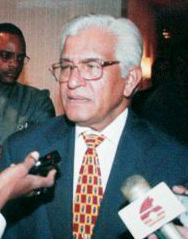

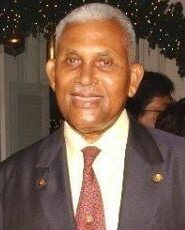
	First party	Second party	Third party
Leader	George Chambers	Basdeo Panday	A. N. R. Robinson
Party	PNM	ULF	DAC
Alliance		National Alliance	National Alliance
Leader since	30 March 1981	1975	1971
Leader's seat	St. Ann's East	Couva North	Tobago East
Last election	54.23%, 24 seats	27.17%, 10 seats	8.20%, 2 seats
Seats won	26 / 36	8 / 36	2 / 36
Seat change	▲2	▼2	Steady
Popular vote	218,557	62,781	15,390
Percentage	52.95%	15.21%	3.73%
Swing	▼1.28pp	▼11.96pp	▼4.47pp
Prime Minister before election
George Chambers
PNM
Subsequent Prime Minister
George Chambers
PNM

General elections were held in Trinidad and Tobago on 9 November 1981. The result was a victory for the People's National Movement, which won 26 of the 36 seats. Voter turnout was 56.4%.

== Results ==
Party	Votes	%	Seats	+/–
People's National Movement	218,557	52.95	26	+2
Organisation for National Reconstruction	91,704	22.22	0	New
United Labour Front	62,781	15.21	8	–2
Democratic Action Congress	15,390	3.73	2	0
National Joint Action Committee	13,710	3.32	0	New
Tapia House Movement	9,401	2.28	0	0
National Freedom Party	864	0.21	0	New
Fargo House Movement	143	0.03	0	New
West Indian Political Congress Movement	130	0.03	0	New
Trinidad Labour Party	34	0.01	0	New
People's Republican Party	25	0.01	0	New
Independents	39	0.01	0	0
Total	412,778	100.00	36	0
Valid votes	412,778	99.36		
Invalid/blank votes	2,638	0.64		
Total votes	415,416	100.00		
Registered voters/turnout	736,104	56.43		
Source: EBCTT, Nohlen
