= Trinidad Humanity Campaign =

- Leader: Marcus Ramkissoon
- Founder: Marcus Ramkissoon
- Founded: 2010
- Headquarters: Valsayn South

The Trinidad Humanity Campaign is a political party in Trinidad and Tobago. Founded in 2010 by Marcus Ramkissoon, the party has contested the general elections in 2010, 2015 and 2020, and the local government elections in 2023.

In the 2025 general elections, the party is contesting three seats — Aranguez/St Joseph, St. Augustine and Tunapuna.

== History ==
The party was founded by Marcus Ramkissoon in 2010. According to Ramkissoon, he founded the party after serving as a volunteer host on a three-hour radio programme discussing "problems and solutions in the country". This experience led him to consider the "massive gap" between the number of registered electors and actual turnout, and decided to offer an alternative to the existing parties that might appeal to those people.

In the 2010 general elections Ramkissoon ran for the St. Joseph constituency as an independent.

== Political positions ==
The party offered itself as an alternative to the "tribal politics" that dominates the country's political system, and compared voting for either major party (the People's National Movement or the United National Congress) as "insanely choosing between two failing managers to run your business hoping that each time they are hired they will somehow improve".

Its 2010 manifesto promised to decriminalise possession of small quantities of marijuana, which Ramkisson said, became a reality "without ever setting foot in Parliament". In 2020 the party proposed the creation of an electronic medical records system, implement a "gun amnesty" which would allow people to trade guns for groceries, while also increasing the penalties for illegal gun possession.

The party has stated that it has "nothing to do with cannabis" and its ideology is distinct from Ramkisson's career as a marijuana activist.
