= National Transformation Alliance =

Political party in Trinidad and Tobago

The National Transformation Alliance is a political party formed in Trinidad and Tobago by former Commissioner of Police and Minister of National Security Gary Griffith in April 2022. They were previously in an alliance with the United National Congress to contest the 2023 local elections. They choose to not continue the alliance ahead of the 2025 general election, instead forming the People's Alliance with Honesty, Opportunity, Performance and Empowerment (HOPE) and the Community Reformation Network (CRN) on 12 March 2025. However, HOPE decided to not put up any candidates but to just support the NTA's candidates and continue collaborating with them. Gary Griffith resigned from the part as political leader after the 2025 election results. The party is now led by Lieutenant Commander Norman Dindial.

== Election results ==
=== House of Representatives ===
Election	Party leader	Votes			Seats		Position	Government
Election	Party leader	No.	%	±	No.	±	Position	Government
2025	Gary Griffith	5,860	0.94	New	0 / 41	New	7th	Extra-parliamentary
