= Trincity/Maloney =

Trinidad and Tobago parliamentary constituency

Arouca/Maloney
- Constituency for the Parliament of Trinidad and Tobago
- Electorate: 26,321 (2015)
- Major settlements: Arouca

Current constituency
- Created: 2007
- Number of members: 1
- Member of Parliament: Camille Robinson-Regis (PNM)

Trincity/Maloney is a parliamentary electoral district in Trinidad and Tobago in the centre of Trinidad. It has been represented since 2015 by Camille Robinson-Regis of the People's National Movement. The constituency was renamed from Arouca/Maloney for the 2025 Trinidad and Tobago general election.

== Constituency profile ==
The constituency was created prior to the 2007 Trinidad and Tobago general election by combining seventeen polling divisions from the former Arouca South constituency with two polling divisions from St. Augustine. It borders Lopinot/Bon Air West, St. Augustine, and D'Abadie/O'Meara. The main towns are Arouca, Maloney Gardens, Red Hill, Trincity and portions of Tacarigua. It had an electorate of 26,321 as of 2015. It is considered a safe seat for the People's National Movement.

In 2025, it was renamed to include the town of Trincity.

== Members of Parliament ==
This constituency has elected the following members of the House of Representatives of Trinidad and Tobago:

Election	Years	Member	Party	Notes
2007	5 November 2007 – 7 September 2015	Alicia Hospedales	PNM	
2015	7 September 2015 – Present	Camille Robinson-Regis	PNM	

== Election results ==
=== Elections in the 2020s ===
2025 Trinidad and Tobago general election: Trincity/Maloney
Party	Candidate	Votes	%	±%
PNM	Camille Robinson-Regis	9,858	64.2%	▼
UNC	Richard Smith	4,443	28.9%	▲
PF	Jamel Hunte	987	6.4%	Steady
Majority		5,415	35.3%	
Turnout		15,350	53.02%	
Registered electors		28,953		
PNM hold				

General election 2020: Arouca/Maloney
Party	Candidate	Votes	%	±%
PNM	Camille Robinson-Regis	12,184	78.78	
UNC	Cherry-Ann David	2,579	16.68	
Majority		9,605	62.11	
Turnout		15,465	57.98	
PNM hold		Swing		

=== Elections in the 2010s ===
General election 2015: Arouca/Maloney
Party	Candidate	Votes	%	±%
PNM	Camille Robinson-Regis	14,843	82.46	
COP	Wendell Eversley	3,157	17.54	
Majority		11,686	64.92	
Turnout		18,000	68.39	
PNM hold		Swing		

General election 2010: Arouca/Maloney
Party	Candidate	Votes	%	±%
PNM	Alicia Hospedales	10,507	67.71	
COP	Anna Maria Mora	4,864	31.35	
Independent	Enoch John	103	0.66	
Majority		5,540	35.7	
Turnout		15,517	68.42	
PNM hold		Swing		
