= Red Hill, Trinidad and Tobago =

Red Hill
- Town
- Interactive map of Red Hill
- Coordinates: 10°37′37.2″N 61°19′15.24″W
- Country: Trinidad and Tobago
- Region: Tunapuna–Piarco

Population (2011)
  - Total: 2,784

Red Hill is a town in Trinidad and Tobago, which is part of the Tunapuna–Piarco region.

== Toponymy ==
The town is also known as Redhill.

== Geography ==
The town covers part of the island of Trinidad and is bordered to the north by D'Abadie, to the south by Oropuna Village-Piarco and Maloney Gardens, to the east by Mausica, and to the west by Bon Air Development and Arouca.

== Demography ==
Demographic data for the town of Red Hill:

Population vertical bar chart of Red Hill between 2000 and 2011

== Politics ==
Red Hill is part of the Arouca/Lopinot constituency for elections to the Parliament of Trinidad and Tobago.
