= Malabar/Mausica =

Trinidad and Tobago parliamentary constituency

- Constituency for the Parliament of Trinidad and Tobago
- Electorate: 19,535 (2015)
- Major settlements: Malabar Settlement, Mausica

Current constituency
- Created: 2010
- Number of members: 1
- Member of Parliament: Dominic Romain (PNM)

Malabar/Mausica is a parliamentary electoral district in Trinidad and Tobago in the center of Trinidad. It has been represented since the 2020 general election by Lisa Morris-Julian of the People's National Movement (PNM).

The constituency was renamed from D'Abadie/O'Meara for the 2025 Trinidad and Tobago general election.

== Constituency profile ==
The constituency was created prior to the 2010 general election. It borders the constituencies of St. Augustine, Arima, Lopinot/Bon Air West, La Horquetta/Talparo and Arouca/Maloney. The main towns are D'Abadie, O'Meara, and Malabar. It had an electorate of 19,535 as of 2015.

In 2025, the name was changed to refer to Malabar Settlement and the town of Mausica.

== Members of Parliament ==
This constituency has elected the following members of the House of Representatives of Trinidad and Tobago:

D'Abadie/O'Meara
Election	Years	Member	Party	Notes
2010	24 May 2010 – 7 September 2015	Anil Roberts	COP	
2015	7 September 2015 – 10 August 2020	Ancil Antoine	PNM	
2020	10 August 2020 – 16 December 2024	Lisa Morris-Julian	PNM	
Malabar/Mausica
2025	3 May 2025 – Present	Dominic Romain	PNM	

== Election results ==
=== Elections in the 2020s ===
2025 Trinidad and Tobago general election: Malabar/Mausica
Party	Candidate	Votes	%	±%
PNM	Dominic Romain	7,690	48.1%	▼18.60
UNC	Dominic Smith	7,428	46.4%	▲13.89
PF	Anita Margaret Hankey	834	5.2%	Steady
Majority		262	1.7%	
Turnout		15,952	54.2%	
Registered electors		29,515		
PNM hold				

General election 2020: D'Abadie/O'Meara
Party	Candidate	Votes	%	±%
PNM	Lisa Morris-Julian	11,864	66.7	
UNC	Maurice Hoyte	5,783	32.51	
NCT	Peter Amann	139	0.78	
Majority		6,081	34.19	
Turnout		17,786	57.77	
PNM hold		Swing		

=== Elections in the 2010s ===
General election 2015: D'Abadie/O'Meara
Party	Candidate	Votes	%	±%
PNM	Ancil Antoine	12,929	66.34	
COP	Patricia Cedeno-Metivier	6,233	31.98	
ILP	Dominic Romain	173	0.89	
DDP	Peter Amann	153	0.79	
Majority		6,696	34.36	
Turnout		19,488	67.03	
PNM gain from COP		Swing		

General election 2010: D'Abadie/O'Meara
Party	Candidate	Votes	%	±%
COP	Anil Roberts	9,695	53.5	
PNM	Karen Tesheira	8,352	46.1	
Majority		1,343	7.41	
Turnout		18,121	69.65	
COP win (new seat)				
