= Mausica =

- Town
- Interactive map of Mausica
- Coordinates: 10°37′16.68″N 61°18′38.52″W
- Country: Trinidad and Tobago
- Region: Tunapuna–Piarco

Population (2011)
  - Total: 3,214

Mausica is a town in Trinidad and Tobago, which is part of the Tunapuna–Piarco region.

== Geography ==
The locality covers part of the island of Trinidad and is bordered to the north and east by D'Abadie, to the south by Centeno and Carapo, and to the west by Red Hill and Maloney Gardens.

== Demography ==
Demographic data of the town of Mausica:

Population vertical bar chart of Mausica between 2000 and 2011

== Politics ==
Mausica is part of the Malabar/Mausica constituency for elections to the Parliament of Trinidad and Tobago.

== Education ==
- Mausica Teachers' College

== See also ==
- List of cities and towns in Trinidad and Tobago
