= Bon Air Development =

- Locality
- Interactive map of Bon Air Development
- Coordinates: 10°37′42.24″N 61°19′42.96″W
- Country: Trinidad and Tobago

Population (2011)
  - Total: 5,748

Bon Air Development is a locality in Trinidad and Tobago, part of the Tunapuna-Piarco Region.

== Geography ==
The locality covers part of the island of Trinidad and is bordered to the north by Arouca and D'Abadie, to the south by Arouca and Red Hill, to the east by Red Hill and to the west by Arouca.

Historical population
Year	Pop.	±%
2000	5,288	—
2011	5,748	+8.7%

== Politics ==
Bon Air is part of the Lopinot/Bon Air West constituency for elections to the Parliament of Trinidad and Tobago.
