= Autistic Society of Trinidad and Tobago =

Non-governmental organization in Trinidad and Tobago

The Autistic Society of Trinidad and Tobago (ASTT) is a non-governmental organization for families of autistic people in Trinidad and Tobago. It was founded in 1990 and is currently active.

== History ==
In 1989, Teresina Sieunarine, whose son Kester is autistic, began an unofficial support group with a few families with autistic children. The group was formally established as The Autistic Society of Trinidad and Tobago on May 31, 1990, with Sieunarine and Gina Mohammed as two of its founding members. Sieunarine's son was diagnosed with autism in Florida, but on returning to Trinidad she found that there was stigma facing people with disabilities and that some autistic children were living in hospitals.

Since 1998, autism specialists Kari Dunn Buron and Joyce Santo from Minnesota, USA have consulted with and advised members of the ASTT. The ASTT has collaborated with the Trinidad & Tobago Innovative Parenting Support group and the Caribbean Kids and Family Therapy Organisation.

In 2003, Gina Mohammed, one of the founding members of the ASTT, founded the Life Skill Centre in Point Fortin. Originally called Parents and Caregivers for Autistic Persons (PACAP), the Life Skill Centre supports low-income and marginalized parents and families of autistic persons in rural south Trinidad. She continued her work with the ASTT for 34 years, even after her autistic son, Rance, died in 2015. Mohammed received the 2025 InterClub International Women's Day Award for her work with the ASTT.

In 2013, the ASTT was the first non-governmental organization to receive the Service Provider of the Year Award from Trinidad and Tobago Coalition of Service Industries.

== Modern organization ==
ASTT has two parent support centers - one in D'Abadie and one in Point Fortin. As of May 2026, more than 1,000 families were registered with the society. It conducts a yearly therapy camp for children, which was virtual in 2021 and 2022 due to the COVID-19 pandemic. The ASTT designates April autism awareness month.

ASTT is a member of the Consortium of Disability Organizations (CODO) and the Foundation for the Enhancement and Enrichment of Life (FEEL).
