= Dominic Romain =

Trinidad and Tobago politician

The Honourable Dominic Romain MP

Member of Parliament for Malabar/Mausica
- Incumbent
- Assumed office 3 May 2025
- Preceded by: Lisa Morris-Julian (D'Abadie/O'Meara)

Personal details
- Born: 1984 or 1985 (age 41–42)
- Party: PNM

Dominic Romain (born 1984 or 1985) is a Trinidad and Tobago politician from the People's National Movement (PNM). He has been MP for Malabar/Mausica in the House of Representatives since 2025.

== Career ==
Romain is a financial consultant and social media influencer. In the 2025 Trinidad and Tobago general election, Romain succeeded Lisa Morris-Julian.

== Electoral history ==
2025 Trinidad and Tobago general election: Malabar/Mausica
Party	Candidate	Votes	%	±%
PNM	Dominic Romain	7,690	48.1%	▼18.60
UNC	Dominic Smith	7,428	46.4%	▲13.89
PF	Anita Margaret Hankey	834	5.2%	Steady
Majority		262	1.7%	
Turnout		15,952	54.2%	
Registered electors		29,515		
PNM hold				

== See also ==
- 13th Republican Parliament of Trinidad and Tobago
