= Counties of Trinidad and Tobago =

Historic administrative divisions

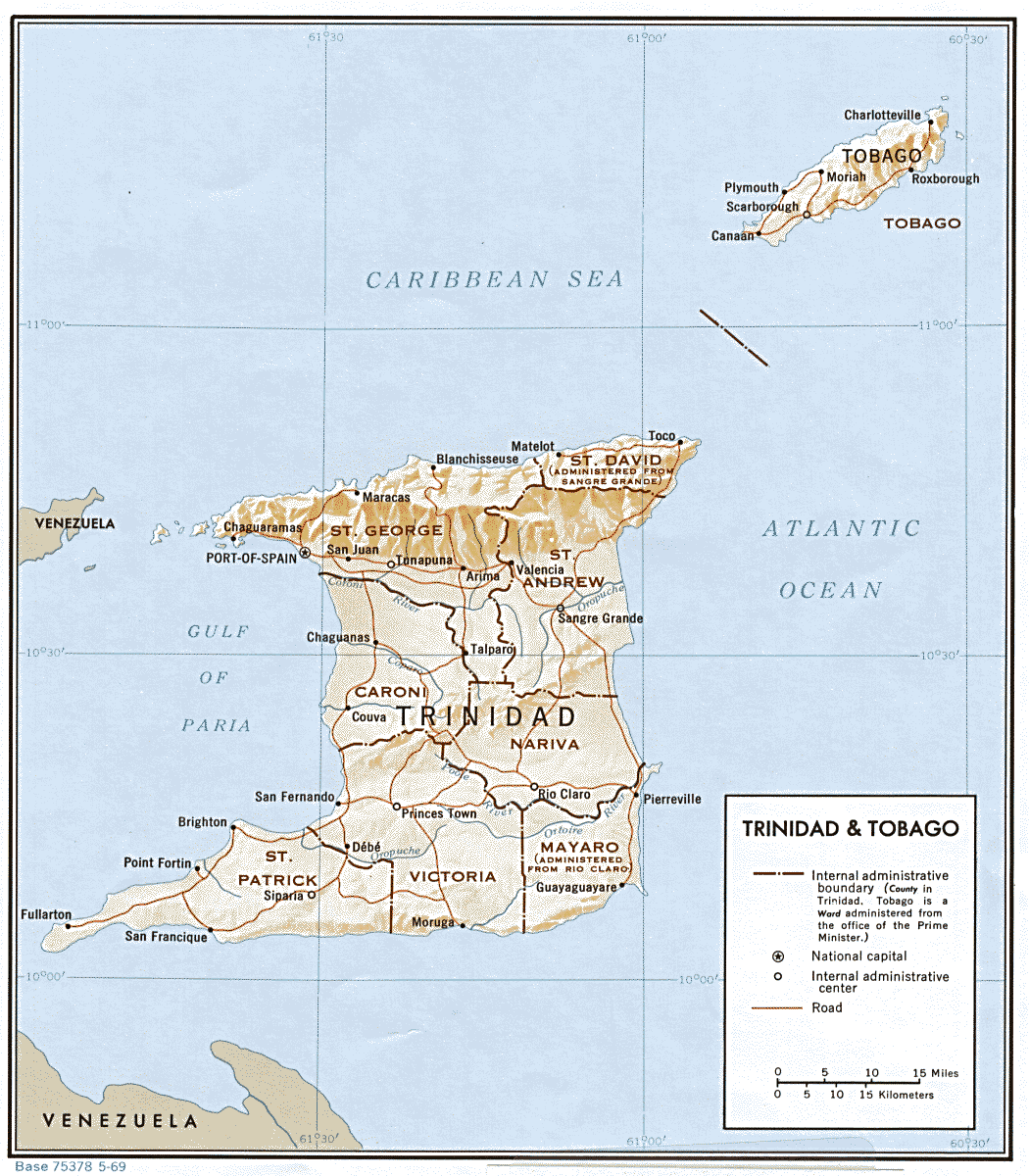
Map showing old counties of Trinidad

The counties of Trinidad and Tobago are historic administrative divisions of Trinidad and Tobago. Trinidad was divided into eight counties, and these counties were subdivided into wards. Tobago was administered as a ward of Saint David County.

The counties are:

- Caroni
- Mayaro
- Nariva
- Saint Andrew
- Saint David
- Saint George
- Saint Patrick
- Victoria

Prior to reform of the system in the early 1990s these counties functioned as the administrative bodies for local government with the following modifications:

- Saint George was divided into Saint George East, Saint George West, the City of Port of Spain and the Royal Chartered Borough of Arima.
- The Borough (City after 1988) of San Fernando was separated from County Victoria.
- After 1980 the Republic Borough of Point Fortin was separated from County Saint Patrick.
- Saint Andrew and Saint David were combined under a single county council.
- Nariva and Mayaro were combined under a single county council.
- Since its establishment in 1980, the Tobago House of Assembly has gradually assumed many of the roles of the central government, in addition to those of local government.
- Caroni was divided into the regions of Couva, Tabaquite–Talparo, Tunapuna, Piarco and the borough of Chaguanas. In 1992, Couva and Tabaquite–Talparo merged to form Couva–Tabaquite–Talparo and Tunapuna and Piarco merged to form Tunapuna–Piarco.

Counties and Wards still play a role in revenue collection by the government.

== See also ==
- Regions and municipalities of Trinidad and Tobago
