= Lopinot =

Coordinates: 10°41′N 61°19′W

Lopinot is a village in Trinidad and Tobago.

It is located in the foothills of the Northern Range, just north of Arouca. It is governed by the Tunapuna–Piarco Regional Corporation. Lopinot, which was named after Charles Joseph Count de Loppinot (1738–1819) is located five and three quarters of a mile from Arouca. Loppinot was a young knight who rose to the rank of Lieutenant-General in the French army. He left France to serve time in the North American French colony of Acadie (which is today divided into the Canadian territories of New Brunswick, Nova Scotia and Prince Edward Island).

He left the colony of Acadie circa 1755, when the French were expelled from the area. He then headed to Louisiana until he recognized signs of future annexation by the United States. His journey then continued to the Caribbean territory of Saint Domingue (known as Haiti today) which was, at the time, one of the wealthiest sugar-producing territories of the world.

It was at this time that Loppinot seized the economically viable opportunity to become a sugar planter. He soon amassed great wealth and acquired land, slaves and a good reputation among his fellow associates. However, his stay in Saint Domingue was curtailed as a result of slave uprisings which began in 1791. After fighting alongside the British in an attempt to reclaim the island, he fled when victory proved unattainable.

After this stint, Loppinot petitioned the British Secretary of State for the Colonies to get compensation for property lost in Saint Domingue. Thus, when the British annexed Trinidad in 1797, the Secretary of State for the Colonies gave Loppinot instructions to go to the island to receive a grant of land by the Governor, Thomas Picton. Loppinot entered Trinidad in 1800 along with his wife, children and about one hundred slaves but was disappointed to learn that Picton had not been informed by the British Secretary of State for the Colonies and so no grant of land was made. Loppinot remained in Trinidad despite this and purchased a sugar estate in Tacarigua. In 1805, the then Governor, Thomas Hislop, appointed him Brigadier-General of the Trinidad Militia. Loppinot used this position to again request a grant of land and this time he was successful. Thus, the Count trekked up the mountains of north Arouca until he discovered flat land amidst the mountainous terrain. He decided this time around to grow cocoa on the estate, La Reconnaissance, which proved a successful venture. In 1806, he built a home on the property. Loppinot was later appointed to the Council of Government by the Governor, Ralph Woodford, and remained a member until his death in 1819. The development of the estate resulted in the development of the nearby Lopinot Village.

The La Reconnaissance estate had remained virtually unchanged until the Government decided to build a dam at the nearby Caura Village. The village was taken over by the government and in order to protect the water supply, in 1943 and 1944, all the adjacent areas including La Reconnaissance were taken over. The village was then renamed "Lopinot" after the man who first established it. After the villagers of Caura were evacuated from the area, they were given the option of re-settling on the newly acquired Government lands at Lopinot. The people transferred the Caura Church (the Church of La Veronica), the la Veronica R.C. School, and their customs, culture and Spanish language to the Patois speaking community of Lopinot. Many of the original residents of the area are descendants of French Creole migrants to the island following the Cedula of Population (1783).

Today, the small village of Lopinot remains largely unchanged despite the fact that the cocoa estates have been cleared to a large extent to facilitate the building of the school, the church and houses. Cocoa estates still remain, and many people still engage in agriculture for a living. Also, remains of his cocoa houses and a jail are still evident in the village. By the 1970s, the Trinidad and Tobago Tourist Board found that the Lopinot Village had great potential as a historic site and began to restore old structures to maintain the historical appeal of the village. Today the area is known as the Lopinot Historical Complex.

The village is reportedly haunted by a soucouyant, and the ghost of Loppinot himself (as seen in Ghost Hunters International).

== Politics ==
Lopinot is part of the Lopinot/Bon Air West constituency for elections to the Parliament of Trinidad and Tobago.
