= Marvin Gonzales =

Trinidad and Tobago politician

Member of Parliament for Arouca/Lopinot (since 2025) Lopinot/Bon Air West (2020-2025)
- Incumbent
- Assumed office 10 August 2020
- Preceded by: Cherrie Ann Crichlow-Cockburn

Personal details
- Party: People's National Movement

Marvin Gonzales is a Trinidad and Tobago politician from the People's National Movement. He has been MP for Lopinot/Bon Air West in the House of Representatives since 2020.

In March 2025, he was appointed Minister of National Security. He was also made acting attorney general.

== Electoral history ==
2025 Trinidad and Tobago general election: Arouca/Lopinot
Party	Candidate	Votes	%	±%
PNM	Marvin Gonzales	7,961	48.6%	Steady
UNC	Natalie Chaitan-Maharaj	7,699	47.0%	Steady
PF	Kenny Nicholas Lee	538	3.3%	Steady
NTA	Nicolene Taylor-Chinchamee	146	0.9%	Steady
Majority		262	1.6	
Turnout		16,381	57.49%	
Registered electors		28,493		
PNM hold				

== See also ==
- 12th Republican Parliament of Trinidad and Tobago
- 13th Republican Parliament of Trinidad and Tobago
