= Kelly Village =

- Village
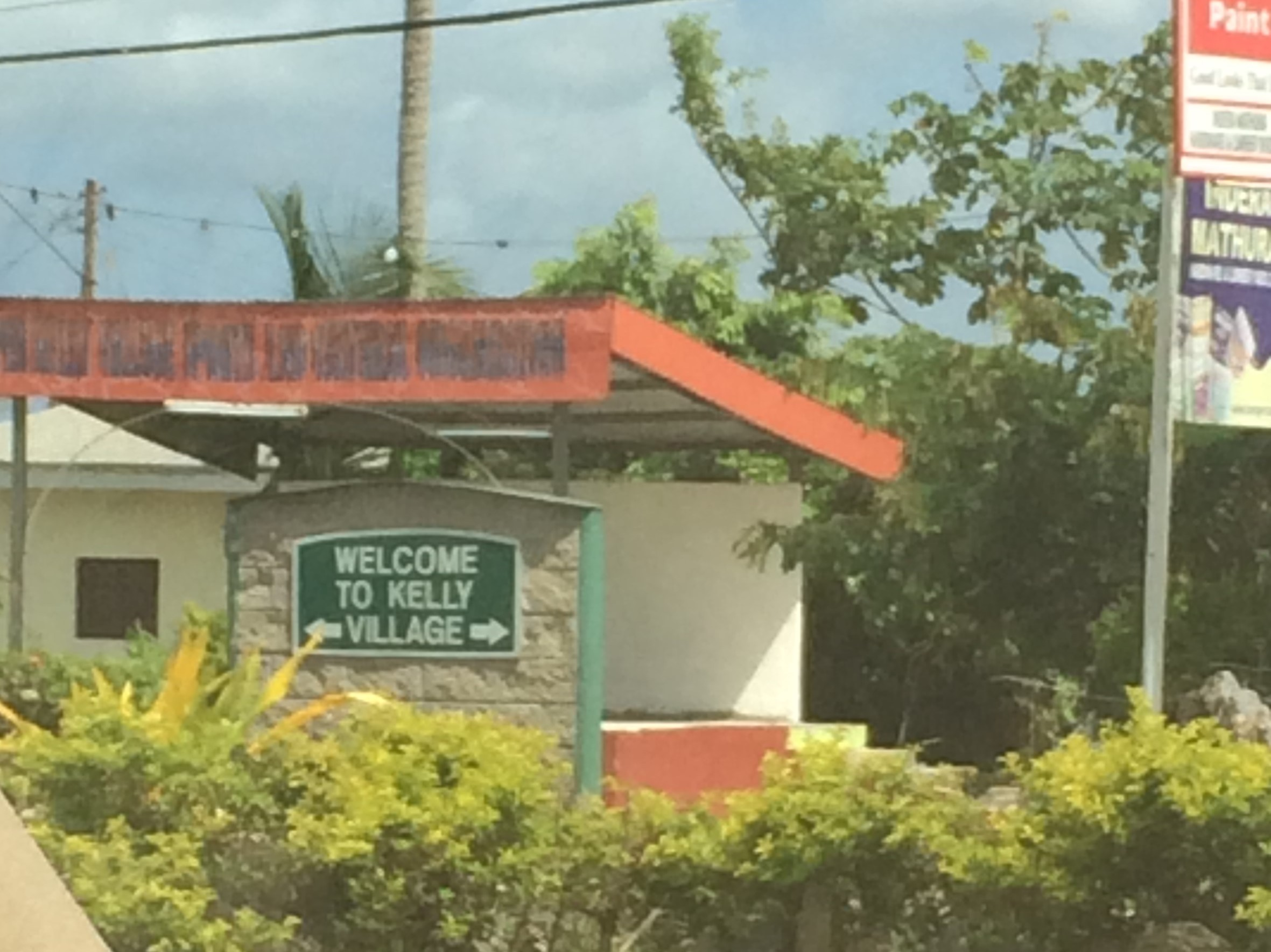

- Kelly Village (Trinidad and Tobago)
- Coordinates: 10°35′N 61°22′W
- Country: Trinidad and Tobago
- Region: Tunapuna–Piarco
- Historic County: Caroni

Government
  - Governing Body: Village Council
  - Member of Parliament: Rishad Seecheran (Caroni East)

Population (2011)
  - Total: 4,178

Languages
  - Official: English
- Time zone: UTC−4 (AST)
- Postal Code: 51xxxx
- Area code: +1(868)-669

Kelly Village is a village in the Tunapuna–Piarco region of Trinidad and Tobago. The village is bordered by the Caroni River to the north, Caroni Village to the northwest, Frederick Settlement to the west, Warren to the southwest, Piarco to the north and east, St. Helena to the southeast, and Cunupia to the south. Kelly Village is located right next to the Piarco International Airport. The Caroni South Bank Road runs through the center of the village. The village is governed by the Kelly Village Council. Their member of parliament is Rishad Seecheran for Caroni East. The village has an online channel named Kelly Village TV (KVTV) that broadcasts the news and affairs of the village. The village has a Hindu temple: the Kelly Village Shiv Mandir. Kelly Village also has the Islamic Center Mosque. The village also has the Bethel's Spiritual Baptist Church, Hydraulic Road Kelly Village Community Bible Church, the Kelly Presbyterian Church, the Kelly Community Bible Church, and the Jesus Life Center Pentecostal Church.

== Notable residents ==
- Ustad Jameer Hosein, Indian classical and chutney singer
- Asha Kamachee, chutney singer
