= Historic counties =

Historic counties may refer to:

- Historic counties of England, subdivisions of England established for administration by the Normans
- Historic counties of Ireland, areas in Ireland separate from the county corporates that existed in some of the larger towns and cities
- Historic counties of Scotland, the principal local government divisions of Scotland until 1975
- Historic counties of Wales, ancient sub-divisions of Wales
- Counties of Trinidad and Tobago
- Counties of Moldova
- Former counties of Romania
