= Delaware Bank =

Bank in Trinidad and Tobago

- Location within Trinidad and Tobago
- Coordinates: 10°55′30″N 60°37′49″W
- Type: Bank
- Basin countries: Trinidad and Tobago Trinidad and Tobago

The Delaware Bank is an area of shallow water 20 miles off Galera Point on the east coast of Trinidad to the south of Tobago. The seafloor comes to within six fathoms (11 meters) of the surface, making the bank a hazard for shipping.
