= Galera Point =

Coordinates: 10.8346°N 60.9092°W

Galera Point is the easternmost point in Trinidad, in the island's far northeast. It is in the county of St David and nearby to the town of Toco. The Toco Lighthouse, also known as the Galera Point Lighthouse, is found at the location.

In 2024, Trinidadian resident Mark Hypolite became one of the first residents to walk the coast of the country from Icacos Point to Galera Point, a distance of 117 miles.
