= Natalie Chaitan-Maharaj =

Trinidad and Tobago politician

The Honourable Natalie Chaitan-Maharaj Senator

Senator of Trinidad and Tobago
- Incumbent
- Assumed office 3 May 2025

Personal details
- Party: United National Congress

Natalie Chaitan-Maharaj is a Trinidad and Tobago politician representing the United National Congress (UNC).

== Career ==
Chaitan-Maharaj is a physician specializing in obstetrics and gynaecology. She was the UNC candidate in Arouca/Lopinot in the 2025 Trinidad and Tobago general election. After the general elections she was appointed to the Senate. She was appointed Parliamentary Secretary at the Ministry of the People, Social Development and Family Services by prime minister Kamla Persad-Bissessar.

== Electoral history ==
2025 Trinidad and Tobago general election: Arouca/Lopinot
Party	Candidate	Votes	%	±%
PNM	Marvin Gonzales	7,961	48.6%	Steady
UNC	Natalie Chaitan-Maharaj	7,699	47.0%	Steady
PF	Kenny Nicholas Lee	538	3.3%	Steady
NTA	Nicolene Taylor-Chinchamee	146	0.9%	Steady
Majority		262	1.6	
Turnout		16,381	57.49%	
Registered electors		28,493		
PNM hold				
