= La Horquetta, Arima =

La Horquetta
- Neighbourhood
- Interactive map of La Horquetta
- Country: Trinidad and Tobago
- Region: Tunapuna–Piarco
- City: Arima
- ZIP code: 350462
- Area code: 643

La Horquetta is a mixed neighbourhood in south Arima, 9 km (5 mi) south of the Arima town center in east Trinidad, Trinidad and Tobago. It is located in the south-eastern corner of the Tunapuna–Piarco region. La Horquetta is bounded by the Churchill–Roosevelt Highway to the north, Arima river to the west, Brazil river to the south, and the Aripo Savannas to the east, and is adjacent to two other Arima neighborhoods: Malabar to the north, and Carapo to the west. La Horquetta is divided into 9 sections: Single Units, Phase 1, Phase 2, Phase 3, Phase 4, Phase 5, Phase 6, Phase 7 and the newly built Greenvale Park. It is the home of the first regenerative agricultural Eco park in Trinidad by Green Army TT located in phase two. It also claims the title of being the largest housing project completed by the Government of Trinidad and Tobago.

== Transportation ==
=== Bus network ===
La Horquetta's bus network provides extensive service across the neighborhood, as well as to the borough center of Arima in central Arima, and to the country's capital city of Port of Spain. Nearly all bus lines serving La Horquetta terminate there; most do so at the last stop for the La Horquetta route at the Phase 7 bus stop.

There is also an extensive Yellow School Bus servicing the Primary Schools and Early Childhood learning centers in the neighborhood as well as the outskirts.

=== Major roadways ===
- Churchill–Roosevelt Highway is a major highway network north of La Horquetta that links the neighborhood with Port of Spain on the westbound lane and Valencia on the eastbound lane.
- Tumpuna Road is a main road linking the neighborhood to Arima on the northbound lane and Brazil on the southbound lane.
- De Freitas Boulevard is the main road that links the northern phases of the neighborhood with the southern phases.

== Education ==
La Horquetta's public schools are operated by the Ministry of Education. There are no secondary or high schools in La Horquetta. Public primary schools in La Horquetta include La Horquetta North Government School and La Horquetta South Government School.

La Horquetta has La Horquetta Early Childhood Care And Education Center.

== Infrastructure ==
=== Health ===
The La Horquetta health center is a government-owned health facility for the neighborhood, located in Phase 3 next to the Post Office, and is the only health facility in the La Horquetta neighborhood.

=== Community facilities ===
- La Horquetta Community Swimming Pool, located on Slinger Francisco Boulevard in Phase 4, La Horquetta and is open to the public 6 days a week (Monday, Tuesday, Wednesday, Thursday, Friday Saturday: 11:30 AM – 6:30 AM)
- La Horquetta Regional Complex, located on Marjorie Padmore Avenue in Phase 2 is a multi-purpose center use for meetings, conferences and neighborhood games.
- Phase 7 Basketball Court
- Phase 5 Pavilion
- La Horquetta Village Plaza
- La Horquetta Steel Drum Complex
- La Horquetta Police Station

=== Churches ===
There are 6 established churches in the neighborhood.

- La Horquetta Roman Catholic Church (Phase 3)
- La Horquetta Seventh Day Adventist Church (Phase 2)
- La Horquetta Gospel Foundation Church (Phase 4)
- Corner Stone Pentecostal Church (Phase 7)
- La Horquetta Deliverance Temple (Sandpiper Avenue)
- True Worshipers Assembly (C.O.G.O.P) (Phase 4)
- Church of God (Prophecy Avenue)
- Christian Brethren Assemblies

== Notable residents ==
- Jamal Gay
- Andre Rampersad
