= Saint George County =

County in Trinidad and Tobago

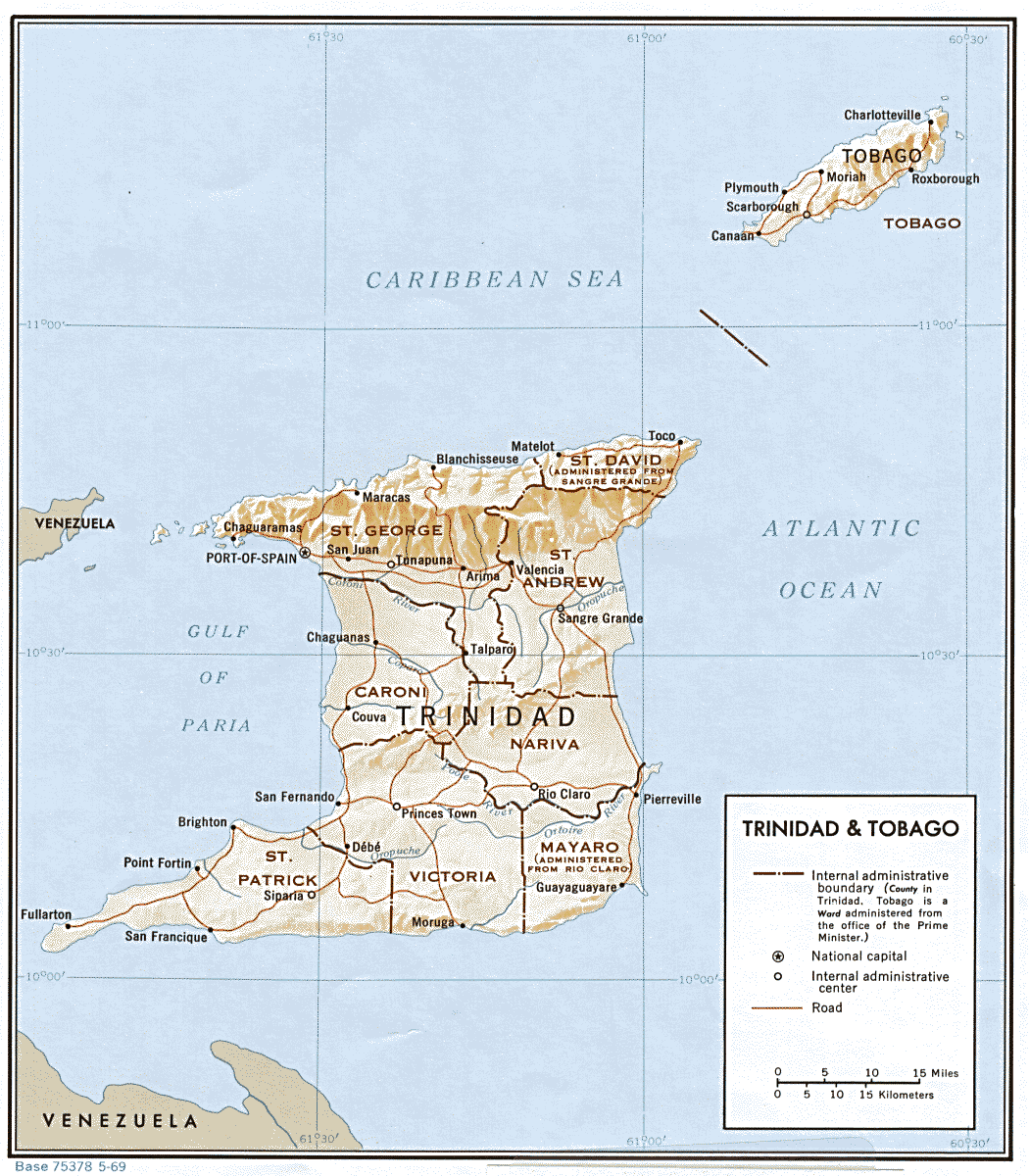
Map showing old counties of Trinidad

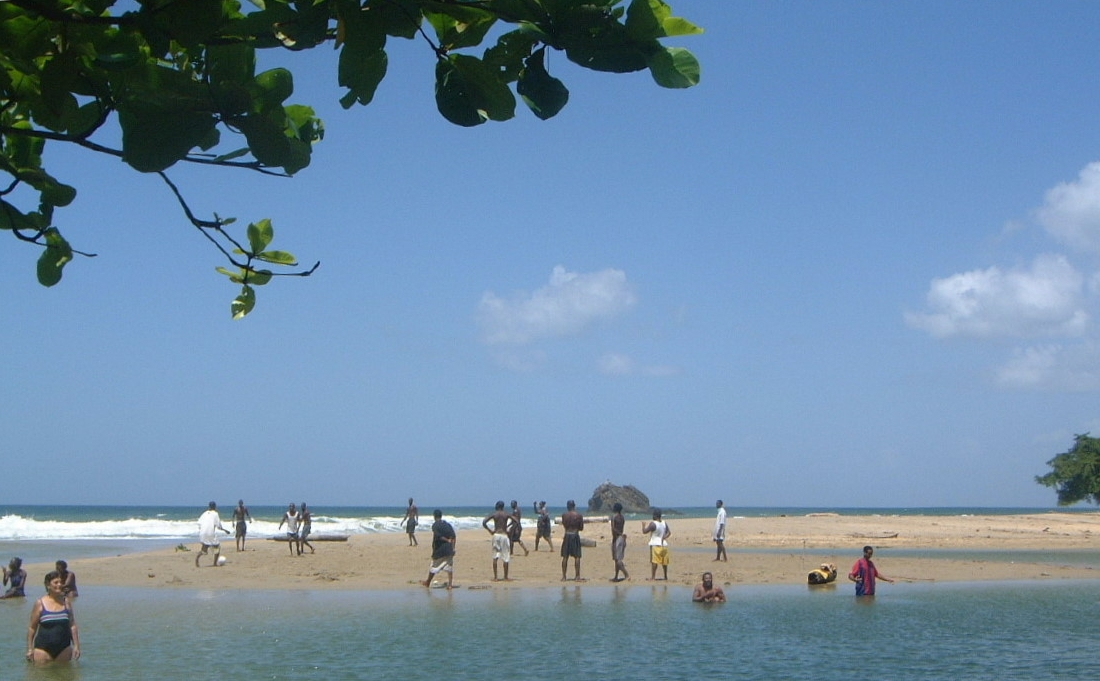
Blanchisseuse beach, Saint George

Saint George is a county in Trinidad and Tobago. It occupies the northwestern portion of the island of Trinidad and is bounded by the Caribbean Sea to the north, the Gulf of Paria to the west, Caroni County to the south and Saint David County and Saint Andrew County to the east. It occupies an area of 912 km^{2} (352 sq mi). The county includes the Bocas Islands and the towns of Port of Spain and Arima. It also includes the small town of Blanchisseuse and its attractive beach, backed by a forest-fringed lagoon. County Saint George is divided into six Wards: Diego Martin, Saint Ann's, Blanchisseuse, Tacarigua, Arima and San Raphael.

Saint George County is one of the most biodiverse and populated counties in Trinidad and Tobago. The county has the majority of the biodiverse Northern Range mountains. The nation's highest peak, El Cerro del Aripo, 940 m (3,085 feet) high, lies on the border of the Saint George and Saint Andrew counties. The second highest peak, El Tucuche is also located in the county.

The nation's largest river, Caroni River meanders through the northern plains and rich Caroni Swamp. Towards the north coast lies some of the country's most iconic beaches, including Maracas Beach and Blanchisseuse.

The nation's bustling capital, Port Of Spain, lies towards the west, and is one of the richest and most successful cities in the Caribbean.

The Piarco International Airport is located in Saint George County. It is one out of two international airports serving Trinidad and Tobago, the other being Arthur Napoleon Raymond Robinson International Airport.

Prior to 1990, local government was administered by Saint George East County Council, Saint George West County Council, Port of Spain City Corporation and Arima Borough Corporation. After 1990, areas formerly administered by the Saint George East and West County Councils were divided between Couva–Tabaquite–Talparo Regional Corporation, Diego Martin, San Juan–Laventille Regional Corporation and Tunapuna–Piarco Regional Corporation.
