= Alicia Hospedales =

Politician from Trinidad and Tobago

Member of the House of Representatives for Arouca/Maloney
- In office 5 November 2007 – 7 September 2015
- Preceded by: constituency established
- Succeeded by: Camille Robinson-Regis

Personal details
- Party: People's National Movement

Alicia Hospedales is a Trinidad and Tobago politician from the People's National Movement. She was member of the House of Representatives for Arouca/Maloney from 2007 to 2015.

== Career ==
She was elected MP in the 2007 Trinidad and Tobago general election. She served as minister of state in the ministry of social development in the Patrick Manning administration. After leaving parliament she advocated for preventive measures on domestic violence. She worked as strategic partnership officer of the Digicel Foundation. In 2022, she was a candidate for PNM welfare officer. In the 2025 Trinidad and Tobago general election, she applied to be the PNM candidate for the newly renamed seat of Trincity/Maloney. However Camille Robinson-Regis was reselected.

== See also ==
- List of Trinidad and Tobago Members of Parliament
