= Cherrie Ann Crichlow-Cockburn =

Trinidad and Tobago politician

Cherrie Ann Crichlow-Cockburn is a Trinidad and Tobago politician from the People's National Movement. She was MP for Lopinot/Bon Air West in the House of Representatives from 2015 to 2020.

She served as Minister of Social Development and Family Services until 2019 when she was replaced by Camille Robinson-Regis.
