= Maloney Gardens =

- Town
- Interactive map of Maloney Gardens
- Coordinates: 10°37′9.48″N 61°19′37.92″W
- Country: Trinidad and Tobago
- Region: Tunapuna–Piarco

Population (2011)
  - Total: 10,768

Maloney Gardens is a town in Trinidad and Tobago, which is part of the Tunapuna–Piarco region.

== Toponymy ==
The town is also known as Maloney.

== Geography ==
The locality covers part of the island of Trinidad and is bordered to the north and west by Red Hill, to the south by Oropuna Village-Piarco and to the east by Mausica. The housing development has 12 car parks.

== Demography ==
Demographic data for the town of Maloney Gardens:

Population vertical bar chart of Maloney Gardens between 2000 and 2011

== Politics ==
Maloney Gardens is part of the Arouca/Lopinot constituency for elections to the Parliament of Trinidad and Tobago.
