= Dominic Smith (politician) =

Trinidad and Tobago politician

The Honourable Dominic Smith Senator

Senator of Trinidad and Tobago
- Incumbent
- Assumed office 3 May 2025
- In office 29 November 2022 – 21 January 2025

Personal details
- Party: United National Congress

Dominic Smith is a Trinidad and Tobago politician representing the United National Congress (UNC).

== Career ==
Smith was the UNC candidate in Malabar/Mausica in the 2025 Trinidad and Tobago general election. After the election he joined the Senate. He was appointed Minister of Public Administration and Artificial Intelligence by prime minister Kamla Persad-Bissessar.

== Electoral history ==
2025 Trinidad and Tobago general election: Malabar/Mausica
Party	Candidate	Votes	%	±%
PNM	Dominic Romain	7,690	48.1%	▼18.60
UNC	Dominic Smith	7,428	46.4%	▲13.89
PF	Anita Margaret Hankey	834	5.2%	Steady
Majority		262	1.7%	
Turnout		15,952	54.2%	
Registered electors		29,515		
PNM hold				
