= Toco =

Village in Trinidad and Tobago

Coordinates: 10°50′N 60°57′W

Toco is the most northeasterly village on the island of Trinidad in Trinidad and Tobago. The island of Tobago is 35 kilometres (22 mi) to the northeast, making Toco the closest point in Trinidad to the sister island. The name Toco was ascribed to the area by its early Amerindian inhabitants. The meaning of the name is uncertain.

Punta Galera (now Galera Point) is one of the sights of Toco. Galera is a slight corruption of the word "galea", the name originally given to the southeastern point, Galeota Point, by Christopher Columbus. The name was accidentally given to this point as well. The name stuck and it remains a popular tourist destination. The Galera Point Lighthouse in Toco was built in 1897 and today is surrounded by a park and picnic area.

== History ==
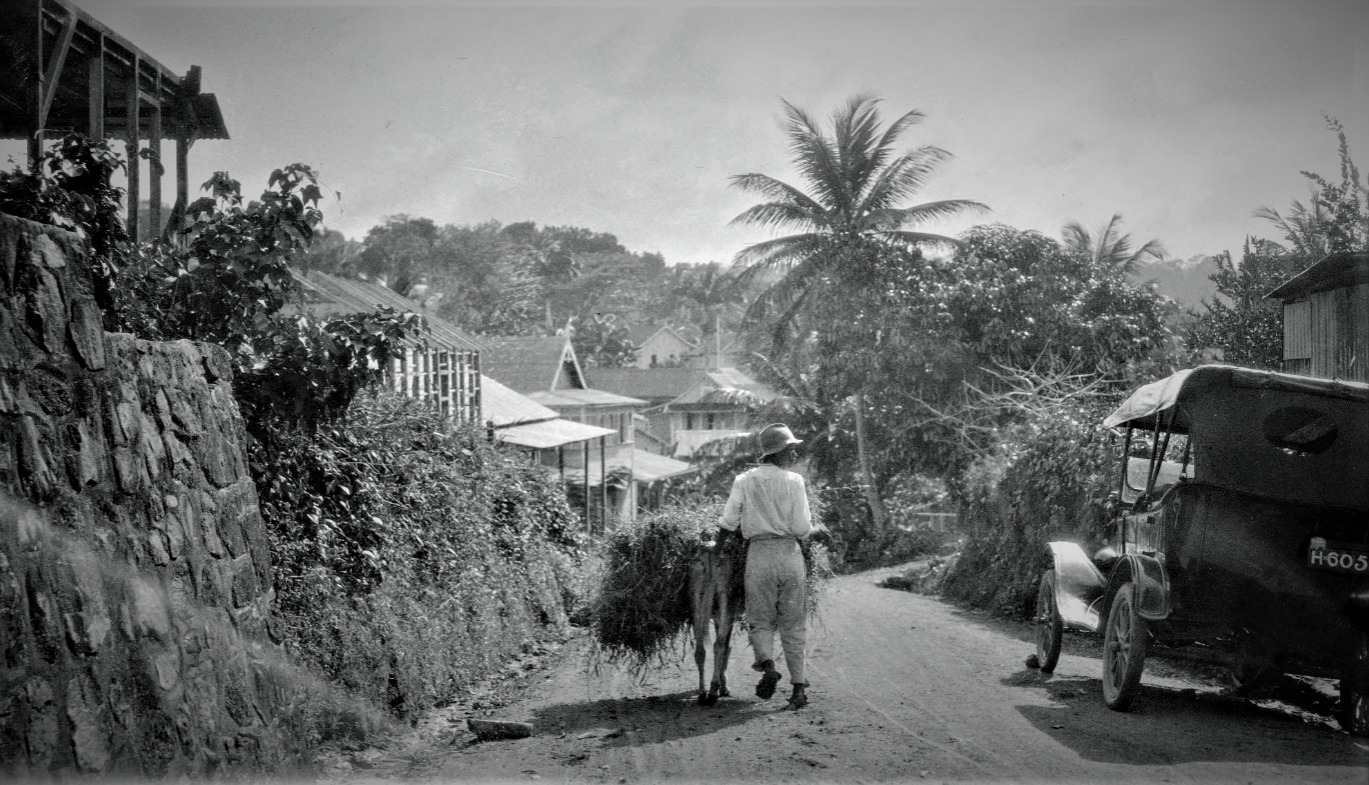
Toco (1923)

Not much activity took place in Toco after the Spanish colonized Trinidad in 1531 until 1631, when Sir Henry Colt and English forces entered the territory without the knowledge of the Spanish. In 1637, the British were expelled by the Dutch, who had formed an alliance with the Amerindians in the area and were, not too long after, expelled by the Spanish.

One hundred years later, Capuchin priests from Spain came to convert the Amerindians to Roman Catholicism. The mission village in Toco was named Mission Village and existed even after the British came. There was another mission near Cumana and was adjoined to the mission in Toco by way of the Anglais Road.

The French also had a big part to play in the history of Toco. They flocked to the region a few years after 1783, when the Cedula of Population came into effect encouraging French islanders immigration into Trinidad. In an attempt to seal off the northeast and the eastern areas, the six parcels of land (the Toco area) were sold. Some of these settlers included the D'Godets, the Moniques, the Ponnes, the Trailles, the Narcises and the Rotans.

Unlike many other areas in Trinidad and Tobago, the land in Toco was not suitable for extensive sugarcane cultivation. Thus, by 1797, there was only one sugar mill in the entire district. However, the land was quite suitable for cotton production. In 1797, there were as many as 59 cotton mills and the population during that period consisted of 159 African slaves, 62 "free" blacks, 28 French settlers and 155 Amerindians who supposedly lived on the missions. Amerindians (Caribs) also lived in other areas of Toco and Cumana during that period.

There were no roads connecting Toco with the rest of the island. So, in 1818, Toco benefited from the round island steamer service started by Governor Ralph Woodford to accommodate the trade in cocoa and other goods.

In 1830, the Catholic Church made Toco a parish and dedicated the newly built Our Lady of the Assumption Church at Mission Village to it. The Capuchins had established the first church in the area.

In 1849, Lord Harris was responsible for creating ward boundaries. Toco was also one of the earliest villages to receive schools under the ward system as early as 1862. Despite the supposed functionality of the ward system, residents of the area had refused to pay ward rates for developmental purposes and so by 1852, approximately 64 Toco estates were put up for sale. This and other factors could have contributed to the sparse population of the area.

However, by 1881, the population of Toco grew due to the popularity of the cocoa and coffee industry and the influx of workers from Tobago. In fact, at one point in time, Toco was mainly populated by people from the island of Tobago.

By 1930, the first road into Toco linking it with Sangre Grande was built ending the dependence on the round island ferry service and the influx of people from Tobago into the area.

Today, Toco remains sparsely populated, although the numbers have grown since the olden days. In 1980, census reports indicate that the population was about 1311. The villagers of Toco are often very friendly. With its serene atmosphere and picturesque beaches, Toco remains one of the most popular surfing and vacationing spots in Trinidad and Tobago though it is not celebrated as much as other parts of Trinidad such as Maracas and Las Cuevas. In Toco, there are several coconut estates some of which still remain. Toco is considered to be a fishing village. Locals can get an education at Toco Secondary formerly Toco Composite, Toco Roman Catholic School and Toco Anglican School.

== Politics ==
For elections to the Parliament of Trinidad and Tobago, the village is part of the Toco/Sangre Grande parliamentary constituency.

== Personalities from Toco ==
- Keshorn Walcott, Olympic javelin thrower
- Mervyn Dillon, cricketer
- Patrice Roberts, female soca singer, musician, songwriter
- Jules Bernard, former Commissioner of Police of Trinidad & Tobago
- Samantha Wallace, netballer
