= Saint Andrew County =

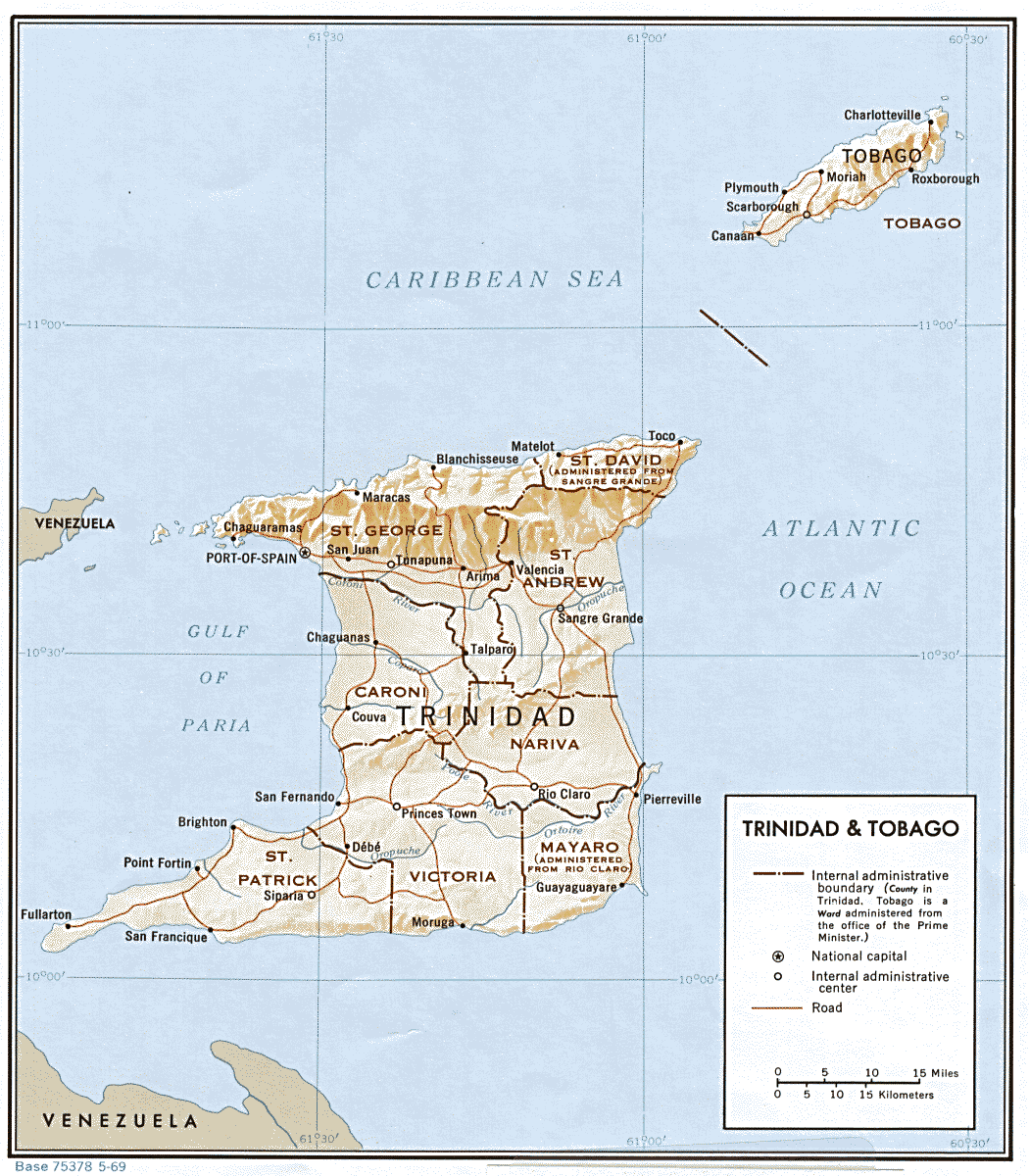
Map showing old counties of Trinidad

Saint Andrew is a county in Trinidad and Tobago which occupies 740 km^{2} (290 sq mi). It is located in northeastern Trinidad, east of Saint George County, south of Saint David County and north of Nariva County. To the east it is bounded by the Atlantic Ocean. The major town in the county is Sangre Grande. Saint Andrew is divided into five Wards - Valencia, Matura, Manzanilla, Tamana and Turure.

Prior to 1990 local government was administered by the Saint Andrew–Saint David County Council. After 1990, this area was administered by the Sangre Grande Regional Corporation.
