= Lisa Morris-Julian =

Trinidadian politician (1975 or 1976 – 2024)

Minister in the Ministry of Education
- In office August 19, 2020 – December 16, 2024

Member of Parliament for D'Abadie/O'Meara
- In office August 10, 2020 – December 16, 2024

Mayor of Arima
- In office 2016–2020

Councillor for Arima Central
- In office 2013–2020

Personal details
- Born: 1975 or 1976 Trinidad and Tobago
- Died: December 16, 2024 Trinidad and Tobago
- Party: People's National Movement
- Spouse: Daniel Julian
- Children: 5

Lisa Morris-Julian (1975 or 1976 – 16 December 2024) was a Trinidadian politician for the People's National Movement. She served as a Member of Parliament in the House of Representatives for D'Abadie/O'Meara from the 2020 general election. She last held the position of a Minister in the Ministry of Education. She was the mayor of Arima between 2013 and 2020.

== Early life ==
Her mother is Ann Morris and she was the eldest of seven children: five girls and two boy. Her grandfather, Leroy Morris, was a former mayor of Arima and her grandmother and great-uncle were both councillors. She attended Arima Girls’ RC School, St. Joseph's Convent, St. Joseph, and St Augustine Secondary School. She studied literature at the University of the West Indies at St. Augustine with a minor in politics.

She became a teacher and taught English literature and language, communication, and theatre at Barataria South Secondary School and Arima Central Secondary School. She also worked as a Caribbean Examinations Council examiner. Morris-Julian became an amateur playwright as a teacher, winning several awards at the Secondary Schools' Drama Festival and appearing on the Cropper Foundation's list of emerging Caribbean writers.

== Political career ==
Morris-Julian first became involved in politics in 2013, when she ran as a People's National Movement (PNM) candidate to be the councillor for Arima Central. She was the councillor from 2013 to 2020, becoming the deputy mayor in 2015. In 2016, she became the mayor of Arima, replacing Anthony Garcia.

Morris-Julian was first elected to the House of Representatives on 10 August 2020 at the 2020 general election. She was a member of the PNM for D'Abadie/O'Meara. On 19 August 2020, she was appointed to be a Minister in the Ministry of Education. On 9 November 2020, she was named to the joint select committees of public administration and appropriations, government assurances, human rights, equality and diversity, land and physical infrastructure, and local authorities, service commissions and statutory authorities.

== Personal life and death ==
Morris-Julian was married to Daniel Julian, and they had five children: two sons, two daughters, and a foster daughter.

Lisa Morris-Julian died in a house fire on 16 December 2024, along with two of her children. She was 48.
