= Tunapuna–Piarco =

Tunapuna–Piarco TPRC
- Region
- Region of Tunapuna–Piarco
- Coat of arms
- Motto: Serving the Burgesses of our Region.
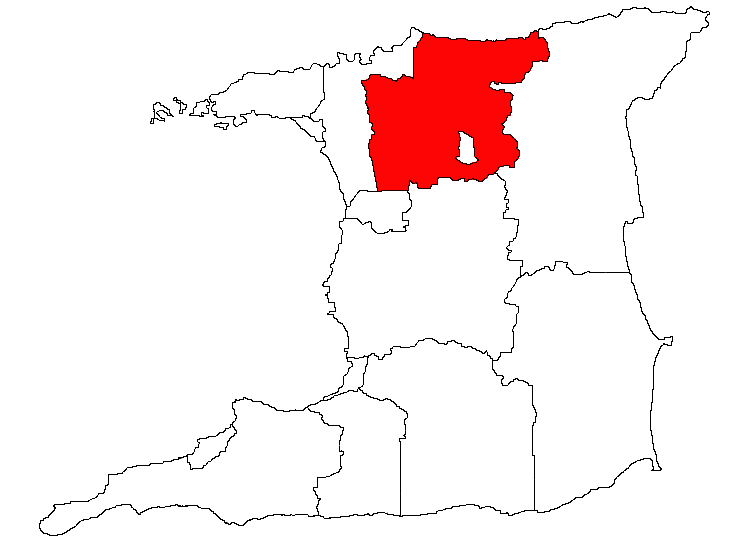
- Location of Tunapuna–Piarco in Trinidad

- Location within Trinidad and Tobago
- Country: Trinidad and Tobago
- Former Counties: Saint George; Caroni
- Former Regions: Tunapuna; Piarco
- Coastline: Caribbean Sea
- Founded: 17 July 1992
- Capital: Tunapuna

Area
  - Total: 527.23 km^{2} (203.56 sq mi)

Population (2011)
  - Total: 212,825
  - Density: 403.67/km^{2} (1,045.5/sq mi)
- Time zone: UTC−4 (Atlantic Standard Time)
- Area code: +1 (868), Exchange: 827, 640, 643, 826, 663, 662, 645, 669, 828, 646, 642, 696
- ISO 3166-2: TT-TUP
- Website: Official website

Tunapuna–Piarco is one of the 9 regions of Trinidad and Tobago. It is the most populous region in the country by total population and the fifth-largest by total land area. Geographically located in Northern Trinidad, Tunapuna–Piarco shares its borders with the regions of San Juan–Laventille to the west, Couva–Tabaquite–Talparo to the south, the Borough of Chaguanas to the south-west, Sangre Grande to the east and the Caribbean Sea to the north. The region also completely surrounds the Royal Chartered Borough of Arima, which is located in the south-eastern corner of the region.

Tunapuna–Piarco is one of the most geographically diverse regions in Trinidad and Tobago. It features the country's two highest mountain peaks, El Cerro del Aripo at 3,084 feet and El Tucuche standing at a soaring 3,070 feet, which both tower the north of the region and the Northern Coast of Trinidad forming a part of the Northern Range.

== Geography ==
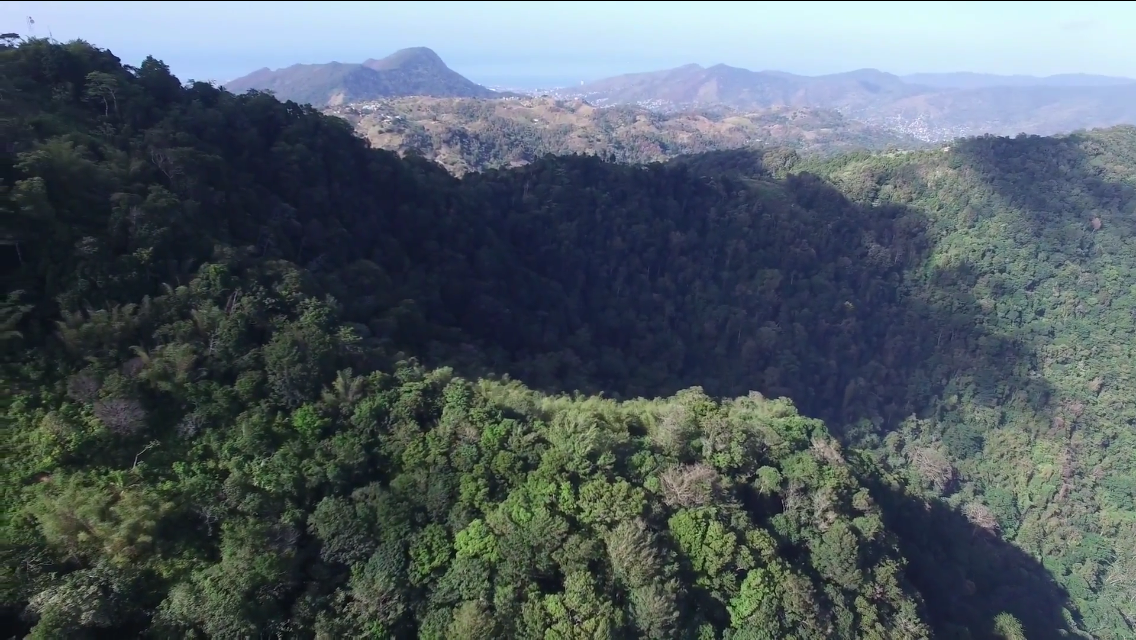
Aerial view over the Northern Range looking west.

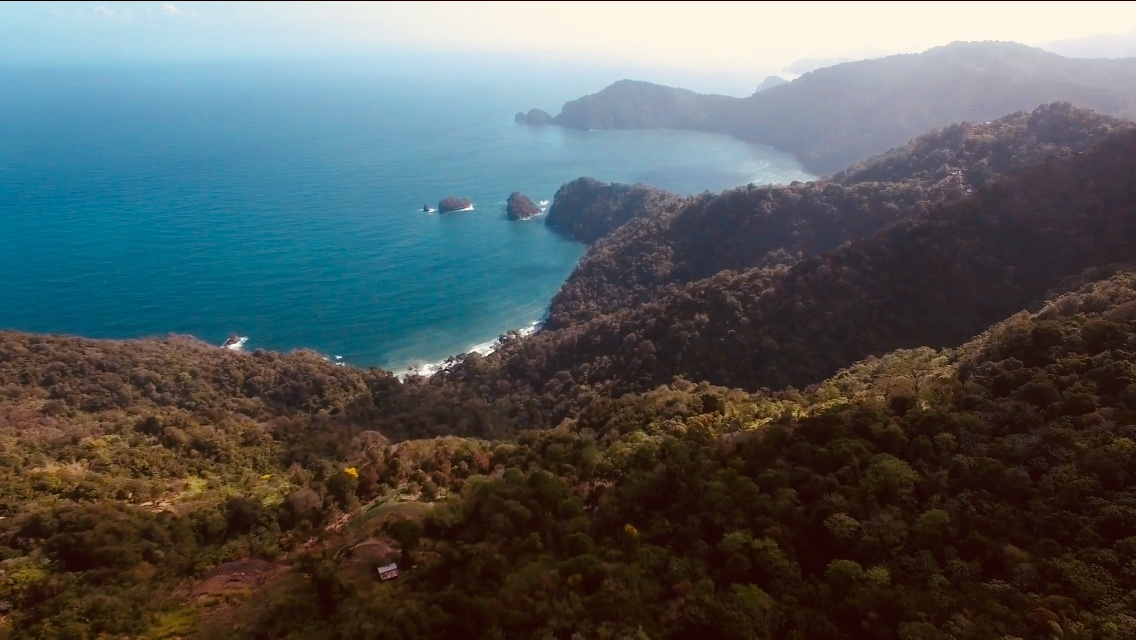
The Northern Range meeting the Caribbean Sea in the north.

Tunapuna–Piarco is the fifth largest region in Trinidad and Tobago accounting for an area of 527.23 square kilometres (200 sq mi). The region has approximately 30 km (19 miles) of rugged coastline with the Caribbean Sea to the north.

The Northern Range which covers 25% of the land area of Trinidad stretches the entire Northern Coast of Trinidad from the regions of Diego Martin and San Juan–Laventille in the west and through Tunapuna–Piarco to Sangre Grande in the east, is located to the north of the region and is the largest mountain range in the country. It is home to the nation's two tallest mountain peaks, El Cerro del Aripo and El Tucuche which both exceeds 3,070 feet and is considered to be a continuation of the Andes Mountain Range on the mainland South American continent which is only 6.8 miles away from Trinidad.

=== Biodiversity ===
The densely forested peaks of the north are home to over 100 species of mammals and 430 species of birds as well as the Red Howler Monkeys, Capuchin Monkeys, Neotropical River Otters, Collared Peckaries, Ocelots and Red Brocket Deers to name a few.

The nation's largest cave system, the Aripo Caves which are inhabited by oil birds as well as the country's highest waterfall, Maracas Waterfall at 300 feet high are also located in the region.

The terrain consist mainly of sedimentary rocks-schists and limestones as well as volcanic rocks in the east.

=== Climate ===
Tunapuna–Piarco is mainly tropical for the most, but changes to being mildly temperate in the highest elevations to the north in the mountains where the elevation is about 2,500 feet at a moderately high elevation outside of the astronomical tropical zone where it is considered temperate land.

Cloud Forest and heavy fog covers the mountains to the north while the rest of the region experiences cloudy skies and heavy rainfall with moderately cool daytime temperatures during the rainy season and dry spells and abundant sunshine in the dry season. The region as well as the rest of the country does not fully observe winter, spring and autumn but experiences similar characteristics of the seasonal changes.

== Demographics ==
=== Population ===
The population of the Tunapuna–Piarco region was reported to be 212,825 by the Trinidad and Tobago Central Statistical Office on January 9, 2011.

=== Ancestry ===
Tunapuna–Piarco racial breakdown
Racial composition	2011
Black (Afro-Trinidadian/Tobagonian)	31.6%
South Asian (Indo-Trinidadian)	27.4%
Multiracial	19.31%
Dougla (South Asian and Black)	6.6%
European (White Trinidadian)	0.31%
East Asian (Chinese)	0.21%
Native American (Amerindian)	0.8%
Arab (Syrian/Lebanese)	0.3%
Other	0.16%
Not stated	14.30%

=== Urban Centers and Towns ===
Largest cities or towns in Tunapuna–Piarco 2011 Census
Rank		Historic County	Pop.
1	Tunapuna	Saint George	16,626
2	La Horquetta	Saint George	13,594
3	Arouca	Saint George	10,869
4	Maloney Gardens	Saint George	10,768
5	Trincity	Saint George	10,075
6	Curepe	Saint George	8,681
7	Saint Joseph	Saint George	8,001
8	Pinto Road	Saint George	6,802
9	D’Abadie	Saint George	5,827
10	Bon Air Development	Saint George	5,743

==== Areas ====
Other areas within the Tunapuna–Piarco Region include

- Auzonville/Tunapuna
- Bon Air/Arouca/Cane Farm
- Curepe/Pasea
- Caura/Paradise/Tacarigua
- Cleaver/D'Abadie
- Wallerfield/La Horquetta
- Five Rivers
- La Florissante/Lopinot
- Blanchisseuse/Santa Rosa
- Carapo
- Macoya/Trincity
- Maracas/Santa Margarita
- Mausica/Maloney
- Valsayn/St. Joseph
- St Augustine South/Piarco/St. Helena
- Kelly Village/Warrenville

== Government ==
Airports Authority of Trinidad and Tobago has its head office at Piarco International Airport, Piarco.

== Businesses in Tunapuna–Piarco Regional Corporation area ==
Caribbean Airlines had its headquarters in Iere House, Piarco. Prior to the establishment of Caribbean Airlines, BWIA West Indies Airways was headquartered at Piarco International Airport in Piarco.

- CLICO
- Trinidad and Tobago Bureau of Standards
