= Saint David County =

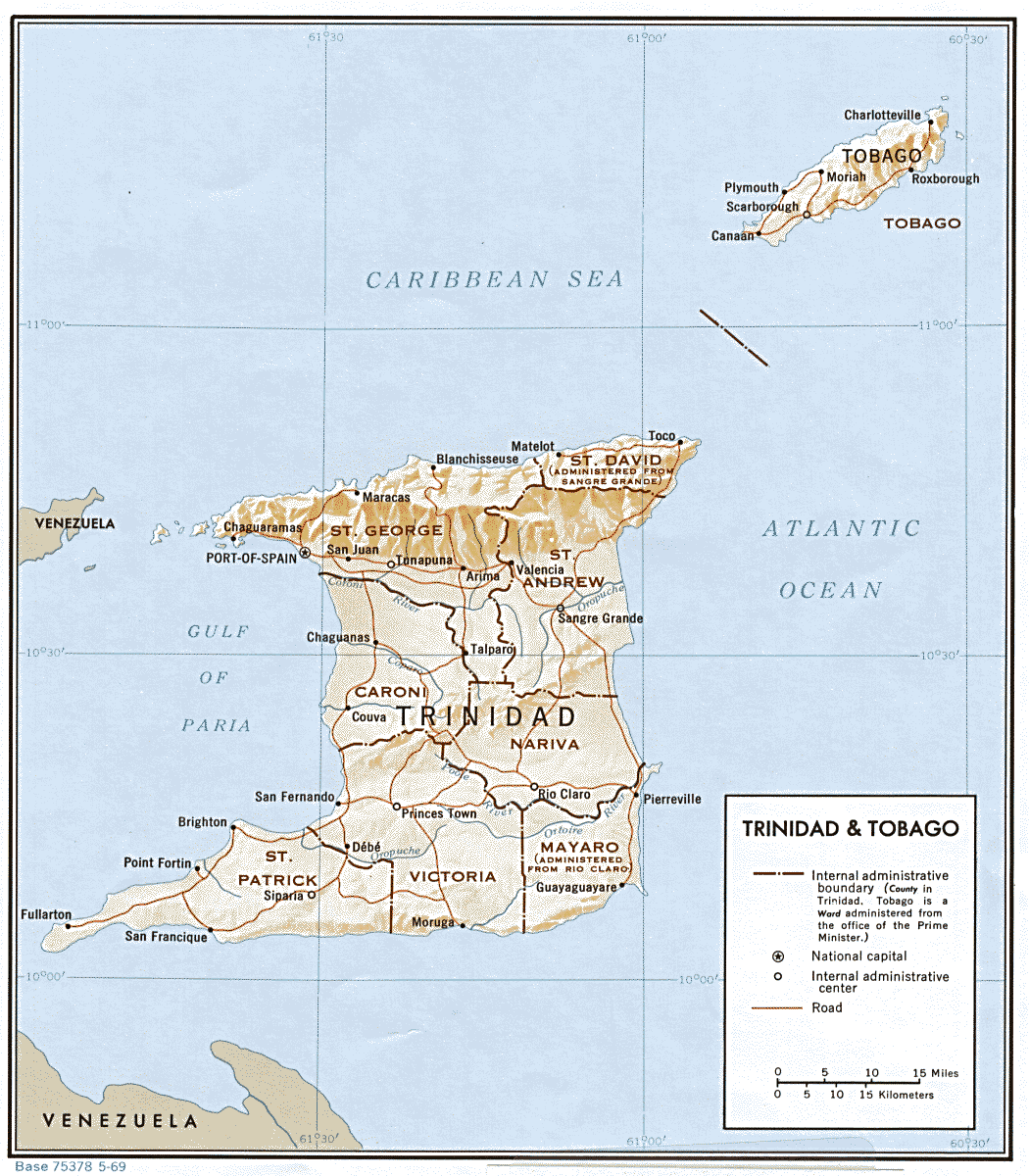
Map showing old counties of Trinidad

Saint David is a county in Trinidad and Tobago which occupies 202 km^{2} (78 sq mi) in the northeastern corner of the island of Trinidad. The main town in the county is Toco. It is bounded to the north by the Caribbean Sea, to the east by the Atlantic Ocean, to the south by Saint Andrew County and to the west by Saint George County. Saint David County consists of a single Ward, Toco, although Tobago was formerly administered as a Ward of Saint David.

Prior to 1990 local government was administered by the Saint Andrew–Saint David County Council. After 1990 the area was largely administered by the Sangre Grande Regional Corporation.
