= Camille Robinson-Regis =

Lawyer and politician from Trinidad and Tobago

Minister of Social Development and Family Services
- In office 30 December 2019 – 1 May 2025
- President: Paula-Mae Weekes
- Prime Minister: Keith Rowley

Minister of Planning and Development
- In office 11 September 2015 – 30 December 2019
- Prime Minister: Keith Rowley

Trinidadian High Commissioner to Canada
- In office 2007–2010
- Prime Minister: Patrick Manning

Minister of Planning and Development
- In office 10 November 2003 – 7 November 2007
- Prime Minister: Patrick Manning

Minister of Legal Affairs
- In office 26 December 2001 – 9 November 2003
- Prime Minister: Patrick Manning

Minister of Consumer Affairs
- In office 25 January 1994 – 6 October 1995
- Prime Minister: Patrick Manning

Minister of Information
- In office 9 January 1992 – 24 January 1994
- Prime Minister: Patrick Manning

Member of Parliament for Arouca/Maloney
- Incumbent
- Assumed office 7 September 2015
- Preceded by: Alicia Hospedales

Personal details
- Party: People's National Movement
- Education: Bishop Anstey High School
- Alma mater: University of the West Indies; Norman Manley Law School

Camille Robinson-Regis is a Trinidadian and Tobagonian lawyer and politician, representing the People's National Movement. She was first elected as a Member of Parliament in the House of Representatives for Arouca South in 1992 and is the current Member of Parliament for Arouca/Maloney. She held the portfolios of Attorney General and Minister of legal affairs (March - April 2025), Minister of Housing and Urban Development (March 2022 - March 2025), Minister of Planning and Development, the Lady Vice-Chairman of the People's National Movement, and the Leader of Government Business in the House of Representatives.

== Early life ==
Robinson-Regis attended Bishop Anstey High School before studying law at the University of the West Indies at St. Augustine. She holds a Legal Education Certificate from the Norman Manley Law School in Jamaica. She worked as corporate secretary at the National Flour Mills and was admitted to the bar of Trinidad and Tobago in 1985.

== Political career ==
Robinson-Regis is a member of the People's National Movement (PNM) and was appointed to the Senate in 1992. She was appointed Minister of Information on 9 January that year, becoming the youngest senator to be appointed to the cabinet. She became Minister of Consumer Affairs on 25 January 1994, a position she held until 6 October 1995. Robinson-Regis was elected to the House of Representatives for the constituency of Arouca South on 27 November 1995, a seat she held until 2007. The PNM was returned to government in December 2001 and Robinson-Regis was appointed Minister of Legal Affairs on 26 December. She became Minister of Planning and Development on 10 November 2003 and held that role until 7 November 2007.

From 2007 to 2010, Robinson-Regis served as Trinidad and Tobago's High Commissioner to Canada. The PNM was in opposition after 2010 and was appointed a temporary senator for the party on 7 February 2012. She became a full senator on 10 December 2013 and remained in the senate until 17 June 2015. She was returned to the House of Representatives for the Arouca/Maloney constituency in the 7 September 2015 general election. Robinson-Regis was appointed Minister of Planning and Development on 11 September 2015. She has been governor of the Caribbean Development Bank since 1 January 2016. She was appointed Minister of Social Development and Family Services on 30 December 2019.

== Controversy ==
Robinson-Regis was accused of using racist rhetoric against Indo-Trinidadians and Tobagonians. In response to accusations made by the opposition party of her party, the PNM, running a child sex ring, Robinson-Regis at a meeting in June 2022 was accused of using the Leader of the Opposition Kamla Persad-Bissessar's full name "Kamla Susheila Persad-Bissessar" as a way of mocking her ethnic name in an attempt to race-bait, and ridicule and mock Indo-Trinidadians and Tobagonians to take attention away from the accusations.

== Electoral history ==
2025 Trinidad and Tobago general election: Trincity/Maloney
Party	Candidate	Votes	%	±%
PNM	Camille Robinson-Regis	9,858	64.2%	▼
UNC	Richard Smith	4,443	28.9%	▲
PF	Jamel Hunte	987	6.4%	Steady
Majority		5,415	35.3%	
Turnout		15,350	53.02%	
Registered electors		28,953		
PNM hold				
