= Blanchisseuse =

Village in Trinidad and Tobago

Coordinates: 10°47′N 61°18′W

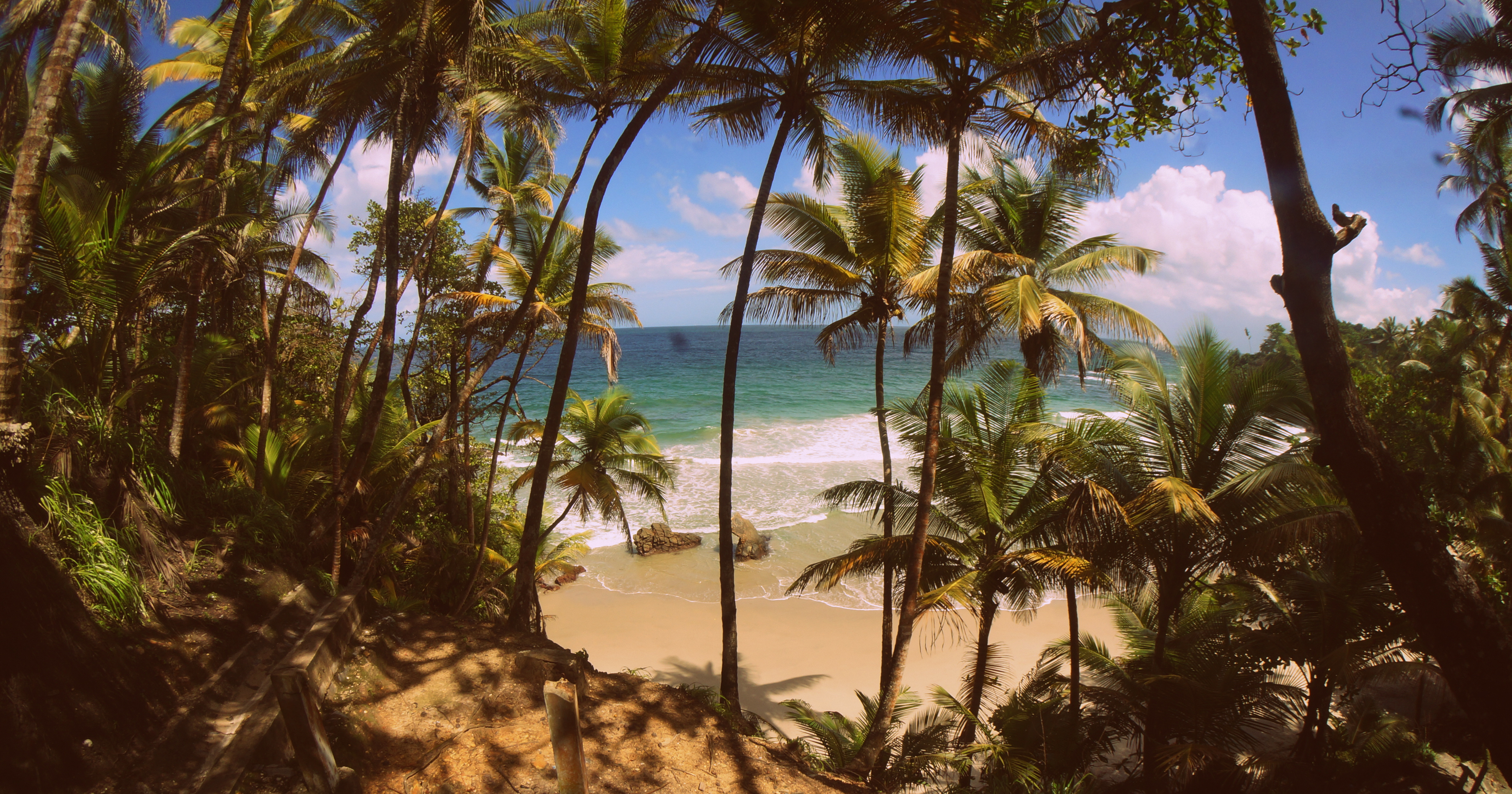
Blanchisseuse Beach, Trinidad.

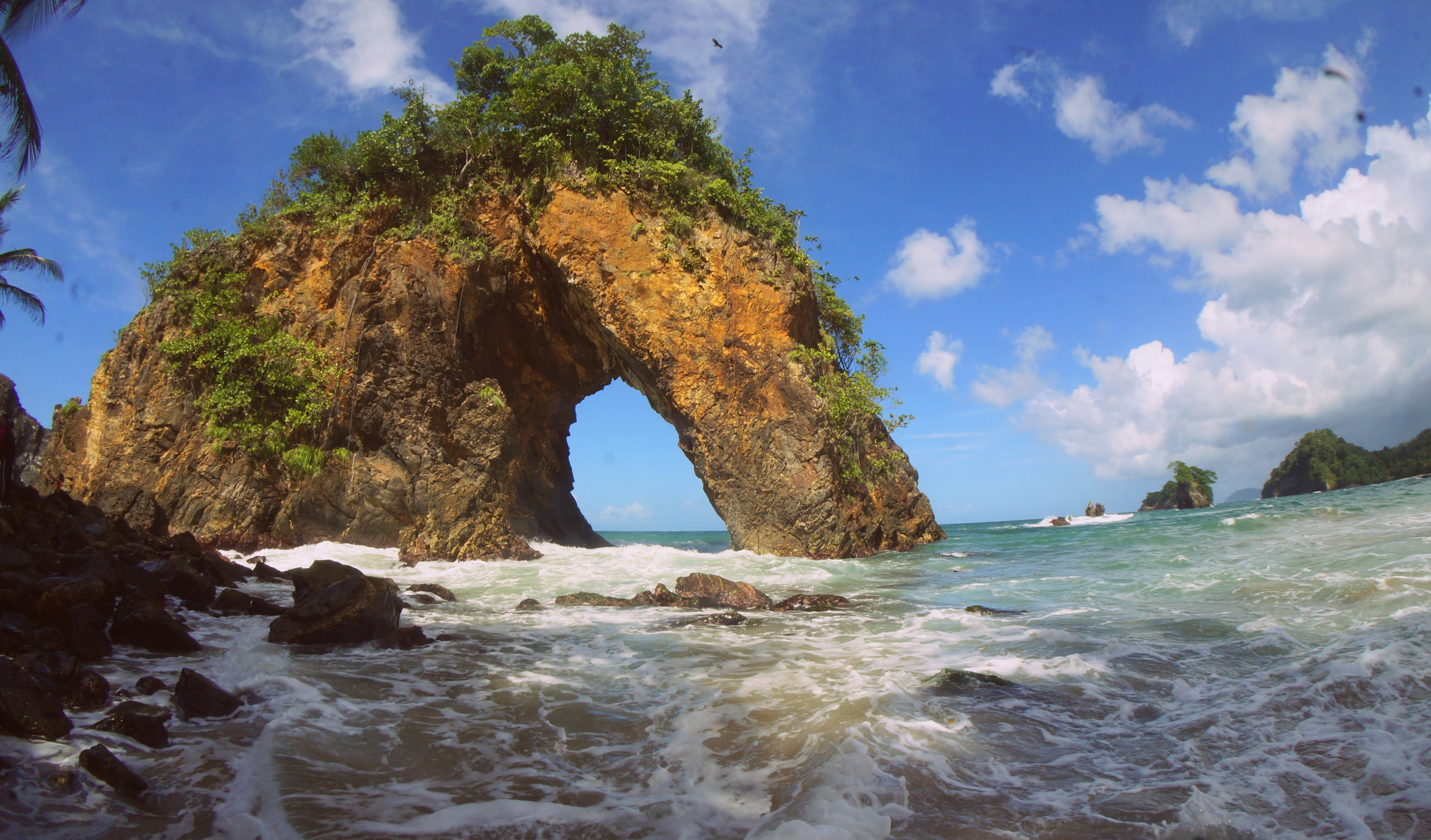
The Paria Arch.

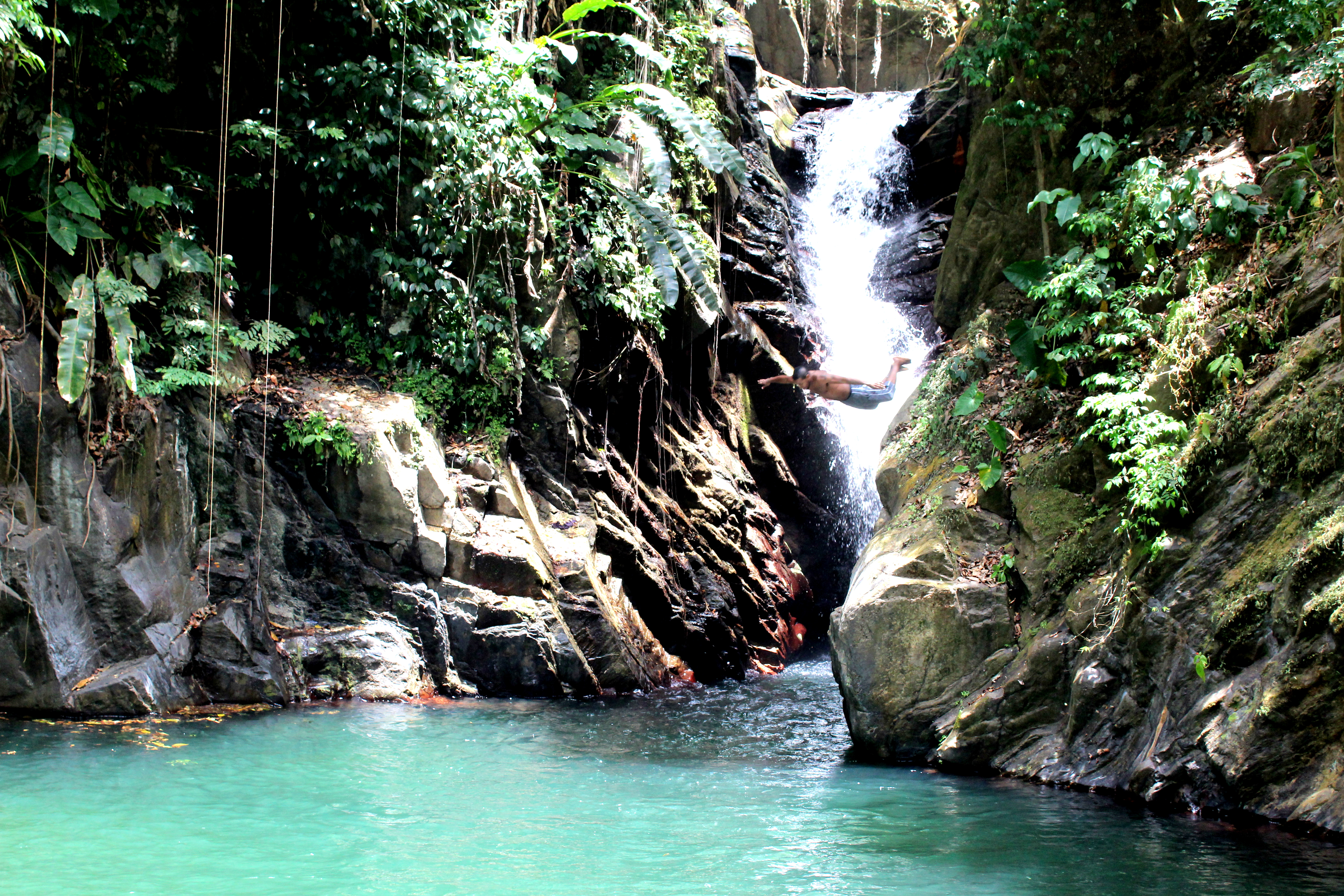
Paria Fall, Blanchisseuse

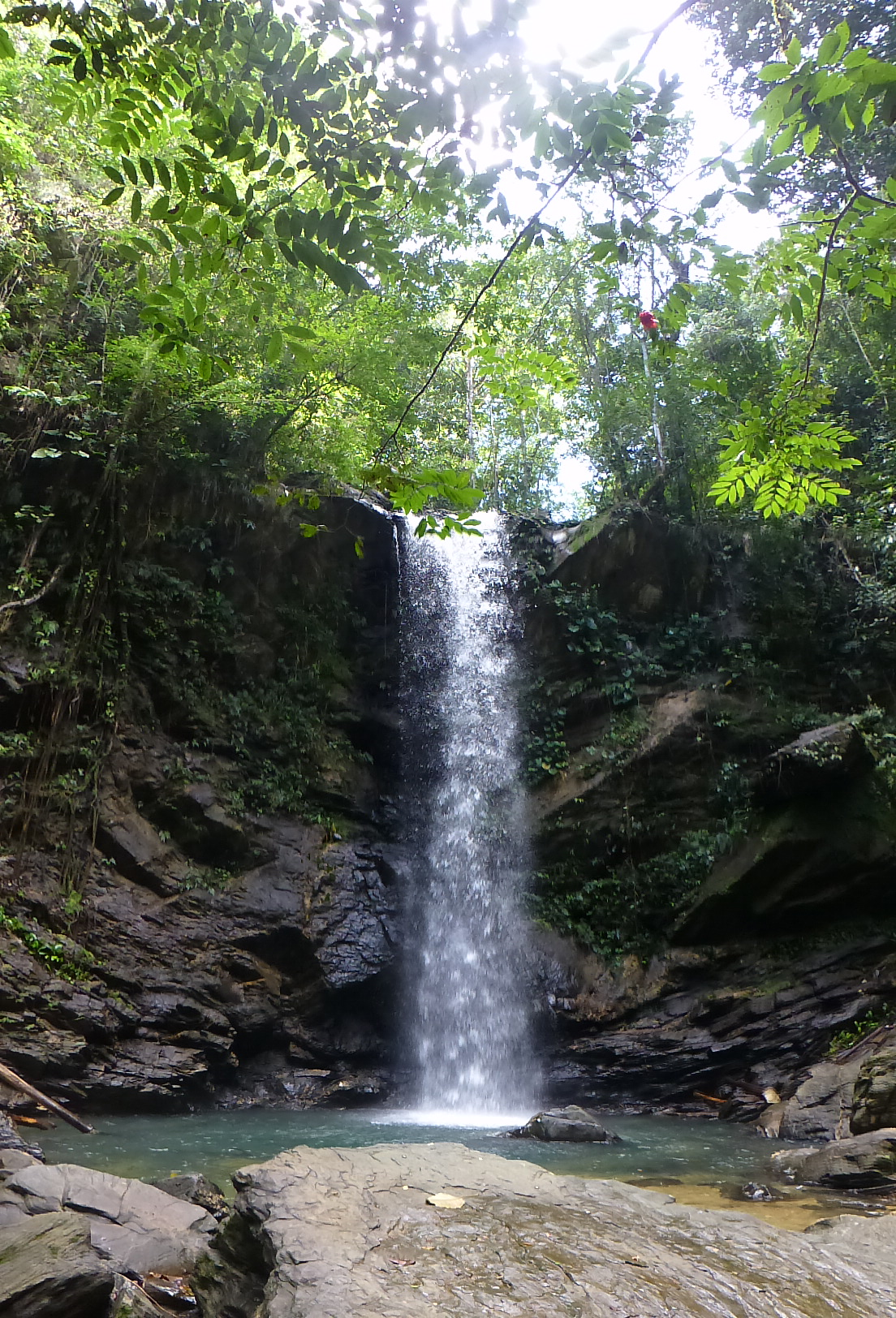
Avocat Fall, Blanchisseuse

Blanchisseuse is a village in Trinidad and Tobago. It is located about midway along the north coast of Trinidad on the northern slope of the Northern Range, about 24 km north of Arima.

The village was settled by the French following the Cedula of Population in 1783.

When Captain Frederick Mallet was charting and surveying the island of Trinidad following its capitulation to the British in 1797, he was told that the village had no name. Observing the women washing clothes in the river, he simply wrote on his survey chart: "Ladies River". Later, the settlers called the place after the washerwomen the surveyor had seen, blanchisseuse being the French for "washerwoman".

The difficult terrain meant there was little development or expansion, and no roads. The settlement was a clearing with thick forests and mountains behind and the sea in front.

The village is accessible from Port of Spain via the North Coast Road or through the Blanchisseuse Road via Arima through the northern Range. Blanchisseuse is located much further than Maracas Beach and Las Cuevas but it still remains a popular beach.
