= Cedula of Population =

Edict in 1783 opening Trinidad to immigration

The Cedula of Population was a 1783 edict by the representative of the King of Spain, José de Gálvez, opening Trinidad to immigration primarily from the French Caribbean islands. Negotiated by Phillipe Rose Roume de Saint-Laurent, a key figure in Trinidad's colonial history, the edict consists of 28 articles governing several forms of land grants to encourage population growth, naturalization of inhabitants, taxation, armament of enslavers, the duty and function of a militia to protect the island, and merchant and trade issues.

== History ==
The edict of 1783 invited persons of either gender and of the Roman Catholic faith to Trinidad who would swear loyalty to the Spanish Crown to receive land allotments in sizes depending on their race and heritage. Specifically, it granted 32 English acres (130,000 m^{2}) of land to each Roman Catholic who settled in Trinidad and half as much for each enslaved person that they brought. Sixteen acres (65,000 m²) was offered to each free person of color, or gens de couleur libre, as they were later known, and half as much for each enslaved person they placed on Trinidad The effect of the cedula was immediate, as what had once been a small colony of 1000 in 1773 had boomed to 18,627 inhabitants by 1797. The Cedula of Population of 1783 laid the foundation for the growth of the population of Trinidad.

The Spanish, who possessed the island, contributed little to advancements, focusing on El Dorado; Trinidad was ideal due to its geographical location. French planters with their slaves, free persons of color, and mulattos from neighboring islands of Grenada, Martinique, Guadeloupe, and Dominica migrated to Trinidad during the French Revolution. The Spanish also offered many incentives to lure settlers to the island, including a 10-year tax exemption and land grants under the terms set out in the Cedula. These new immigrants establishing local communities of Blanchisseuse, Champs Fleurs, Cascade, Carenage and Laventille. Trinidad's population jumped from just under 1,400 in 1777 to over 15,000 by the end of 1789.

Upon the British capture of Trinidad in 1797, the Cedula of Population became a paramount document that established the legal status of free persons of color in Trinidad, as set out in the declaration of capitulation. In particular, it protected their "liberty, persons and property like other inhabitants." in the British Crown Colony.
