= Arouca/Lopinot =

Trinidad and Tobago parliamentary constituency

- Constituency for the Parliament of Trinidad and Tobago
- Lopinot/Bon Air West is number 14 on this map
- Electorate: 26,564 (2015)
- Major settlements: Lopinot and Bon Air

Current constituency
- Created: 2007
- Number of members: 1
- Member of Parliament: Marvin Gonzales (PNM)

Arouca/Lopinot is a parliamentary constituency in Trinidad and Tobago. It was renamed from Lopinot/Bon Air West for the 2025 Trinidad and Tobago general election.

== Geography ==
The constituency was named for Lopinot and Bon Air. In 2025, it was renamed to include the town of Arouca.

It had an electorate of 26,564 as of 2015.

== Members ==
Lopinot/Bon Air West
| Election | Member | Party | Notes |
|---|---|---|---|
| 2007 | Neil Parsanlal | PNM | |
| 2010 | Lincoln Douglas | COP | |
| 2015 | Cherrie Ann Crichlow-Cockburn | PNM | |
| 2020 | Marvin Gonzales | PNM | |
Arouca/Lopinot
| 2025 | Marvin Gonzales | PNM | |

== Elections ==
2025 Trinidad and Tobago general election: Arouca/Lopinot
| Party | Candidate | Votes | % | ±% |
|---|---|---|---|---|
| PNM | Marvin Gonzales | 7,961 | 48.6% | Steady |
| UNC | Natalie Chaitan-Maharaj | 7,699 | 47.0% | Steady |
| PF | Kenny Nicholas Lee | 538 | 3.3% | Steady |
| NTA | Nicolene Taylor-Chinchamee | 146 | 0.9% | Steady |
| Majority | | 262 | 1.6 | |
| Turnout | | 16,381 | 57.49% | |
| Registered electors | | 28,493 | | |
| PNM hold | | | | |
