= Arouca, Trinidad and Tobago =

Arouca San Agustín de Arouca
- Town
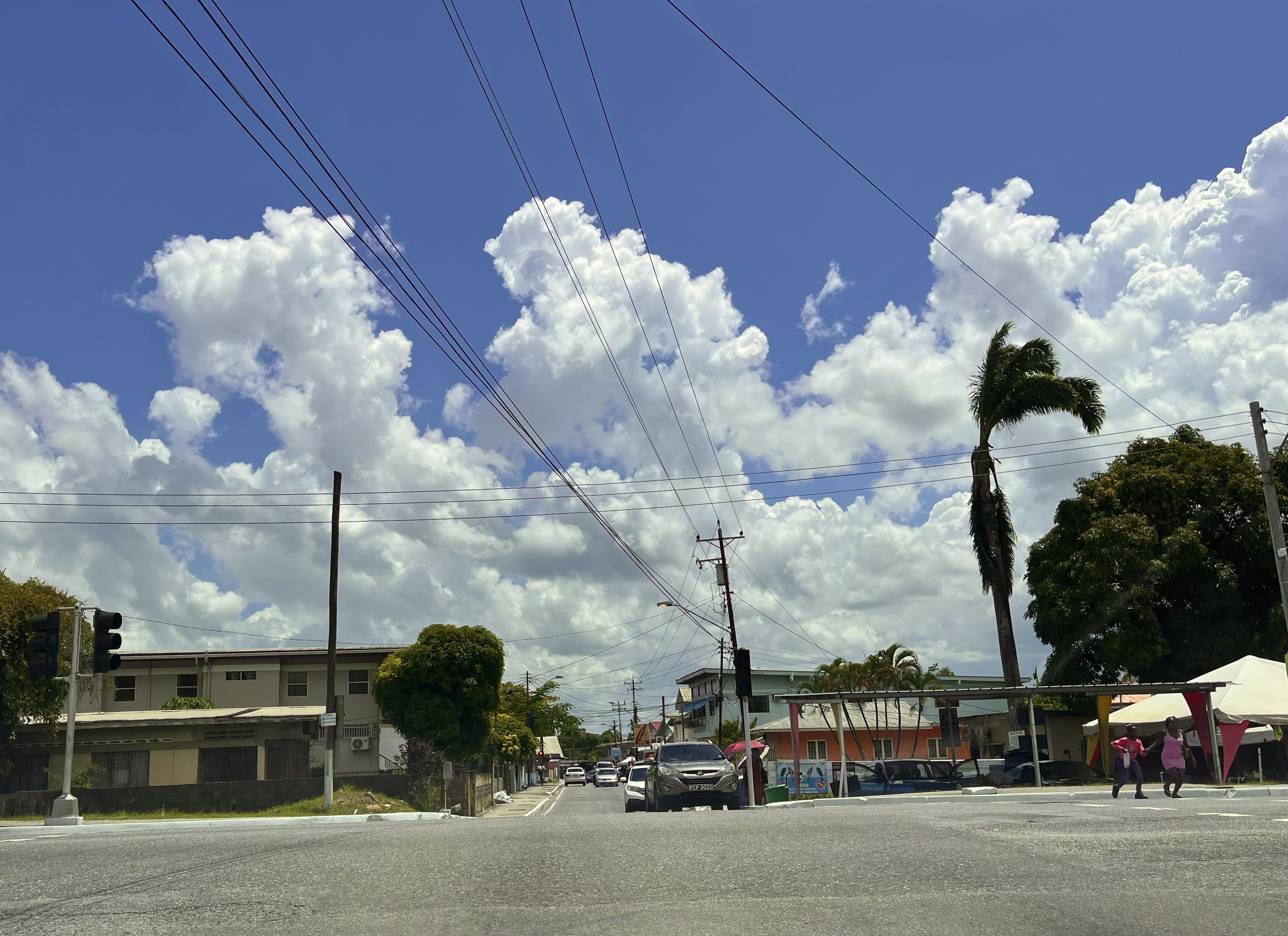

- Location in Trinidad and Tobago
- Coordinates: 10°38′N 61°20′W
- Country: Trinidad and Tobago
- Region: Tunapuna–Piarco

Population (2011)
  - Total: 10,869
- Time zone: UTC−4 (AST)
- Area code: 692

Arouca is a town in the East–West Corridor of Trinidad and Tobago located 19 km (12 mi) east of Port of Spain, along the Eastern Main Road. It is located west of Arima, east of Tunapuna and Tacarigua, south of Lopinot, and north of Piarco. It is governed by the Tunapuna–Piarco Regional Corporation. Arouca may be a corruption of Arauca, an Amerindian tribe.

During most of the Spanish rule, Arouca (then called San Agustín de Arouca) was a settlement reserved for Amerindians. However, when the French arrived in 1783 under Governor José María Chacón's Cedula de Repoblación the Amerindians were restricted to Arima. Most of the land in Arouca was split between the Tablau and Chaumet families. Arouca steadily grew into a major agricultural center, but the extension of the railroad to Sangre Grande in 1898 lured many people in Arouca to relocate to the more prosperous Sangre Grande valley.

Today, it mainly comprises residential housing. There are several schools located in Arouca including the Bon Air Primary School, Arouca Anglican Primary School, Arouca Girls R.C., Arouca Boys R.C., Arouca Government Primary Schools and Bon Air High School.

Arouca is home to four prisons and one correctional facility. These include the Golden Grove Prison, Remand Prison, Women's Prison and Youth Training and Rehabilitation Centre.

== Prominent people from Arouca ==
- George Padmore, Writer
- Henry Sylvester Williams, Politician
- Jaswick Taylor, Cricketer
- Learie Constantine, Cricketer and Politician
- Emmanuel Callender, Sprinter

== Gallery ==
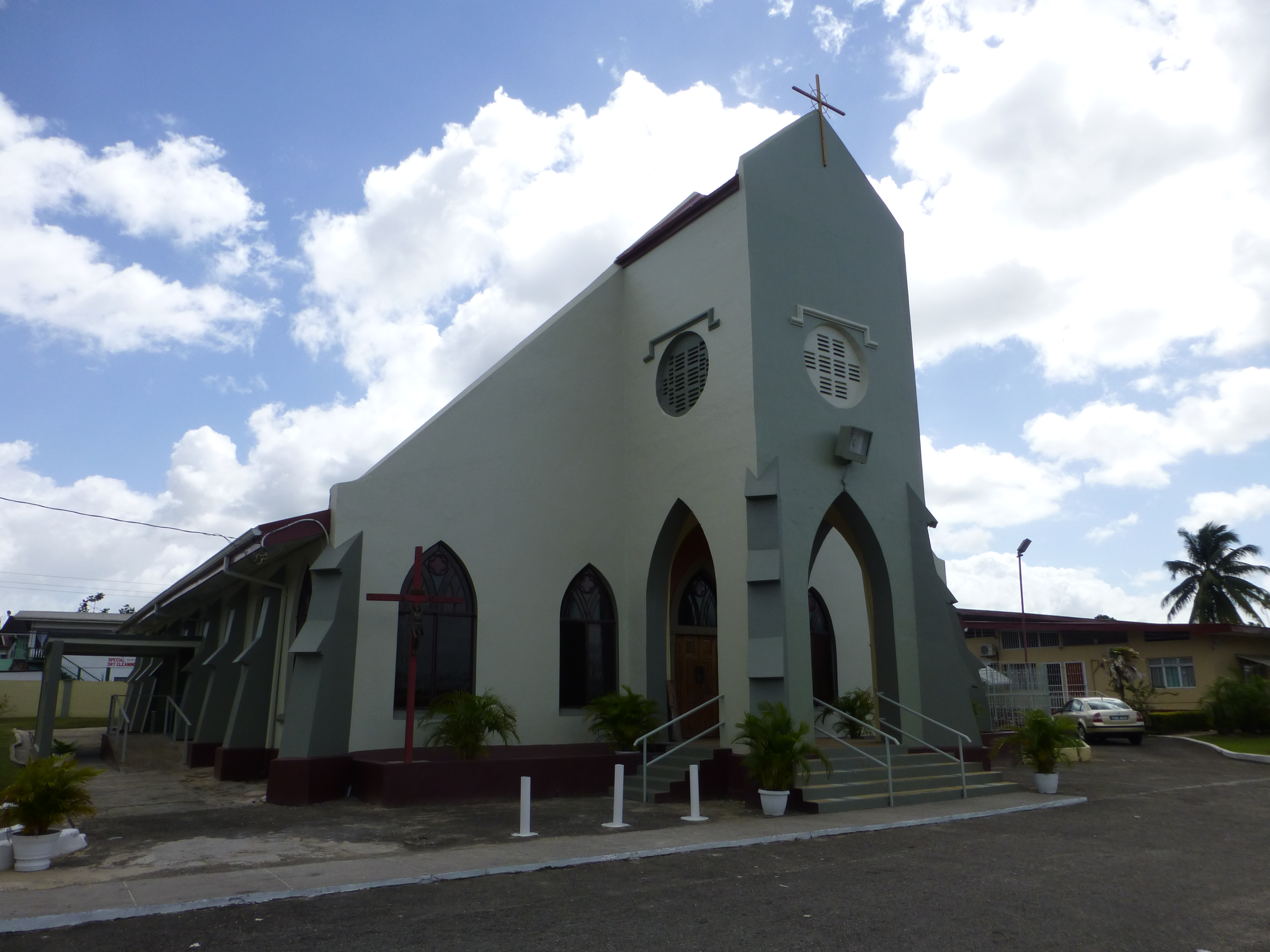
Holy Trinity Church

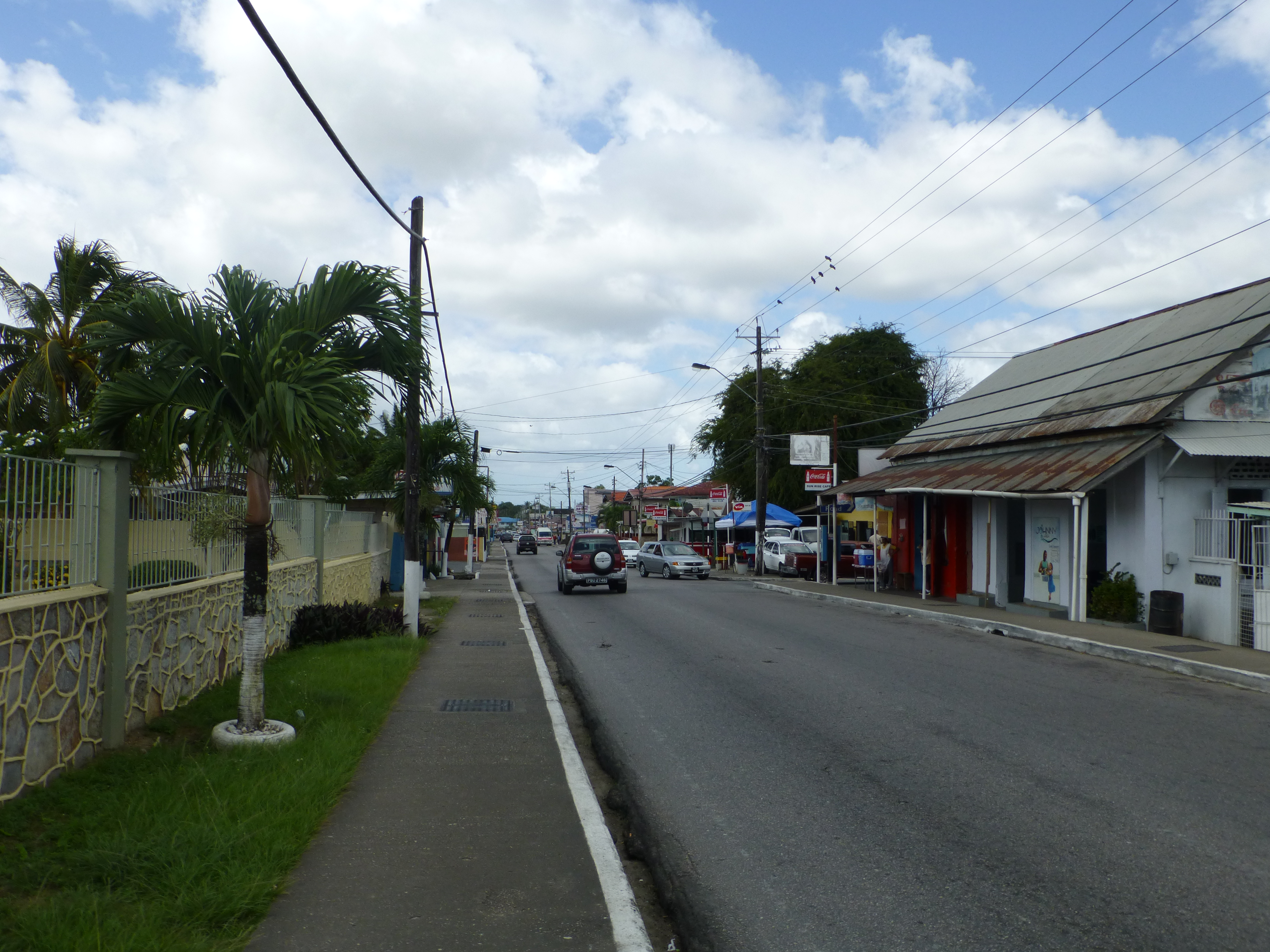
Eastern Main Road

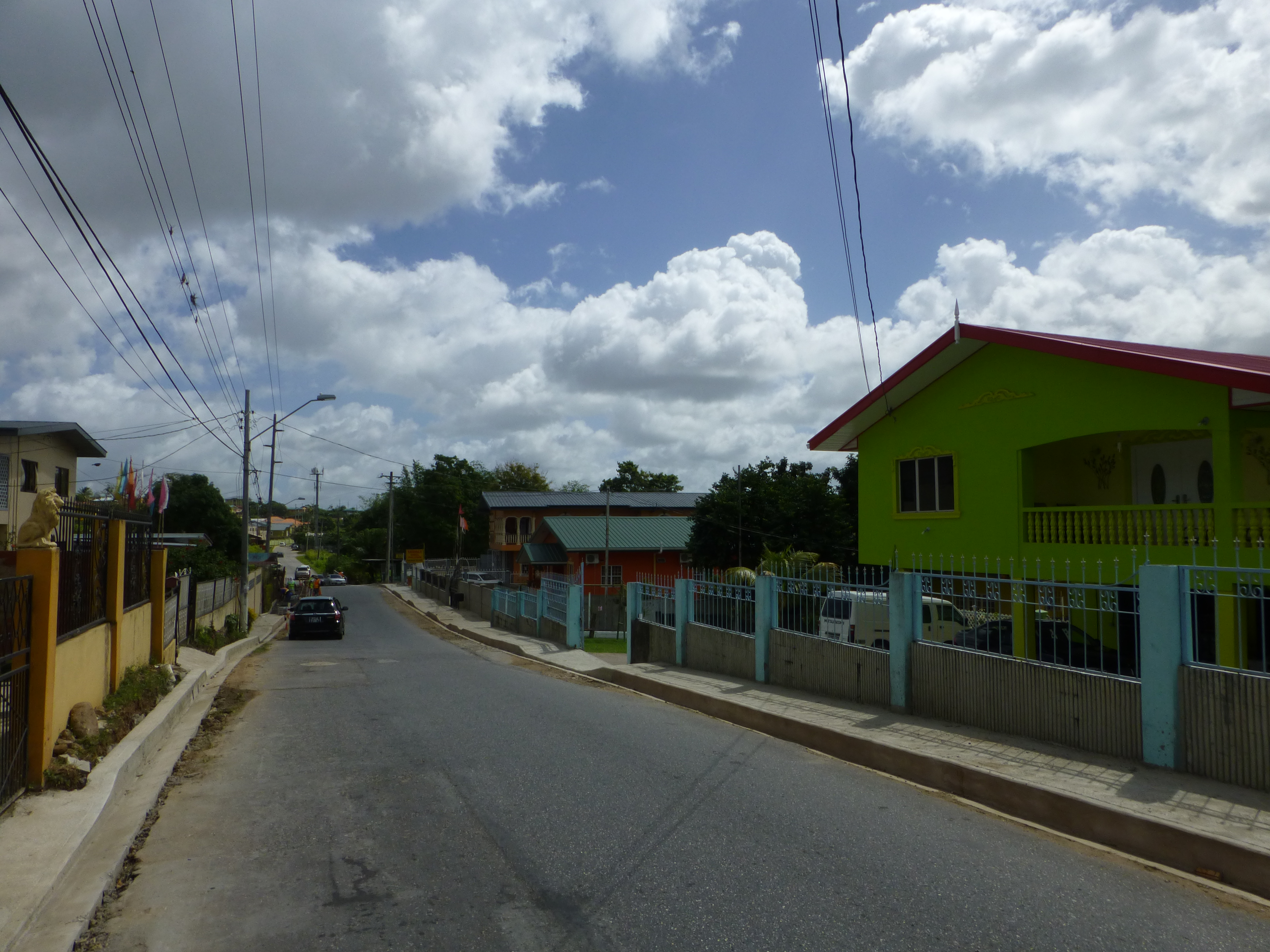
Arouca

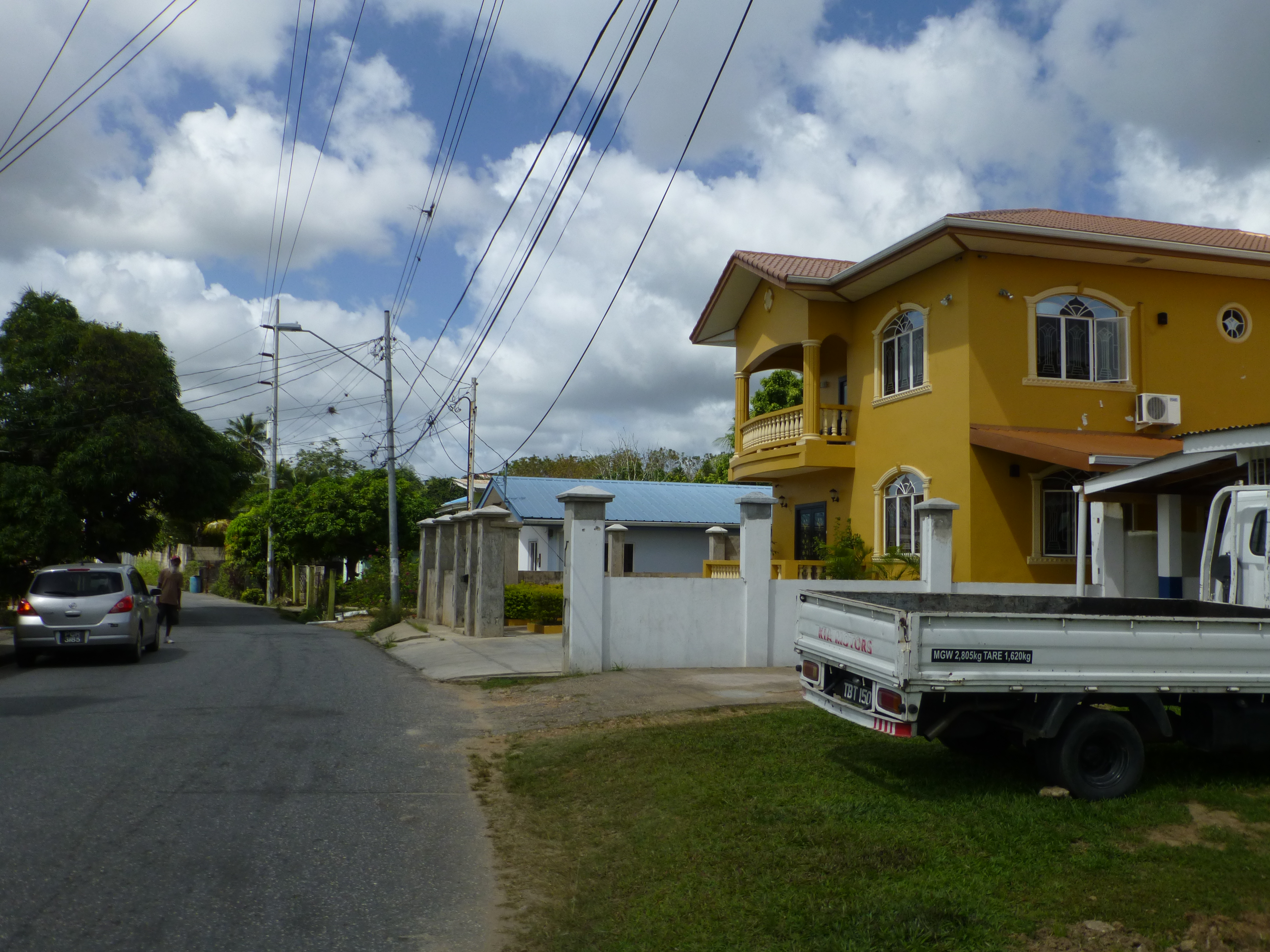
Arouca
