= D'Abadie =

Coordinates: 10°38′N 61°19′W

- Interactive map of D'Abadie
- Country: Trinidad and Tobago
- Region: Tunapuna-Piarco

Population (2011)
  - Total: 5,827

D'Abadie is a community located in the Tunapuna–Piarco region in Trinidad and Tobago. Its population is 5,827 people. Among its schools are Pinehaven S.D.A. Primary School and D'abadie Government Primary School. One of its attractions is Cleaver Woods, a park dedicated to the history and culture of the indigenous Caribs.

The current member of parliament for D'Abadie is Ancil Antoine.
