= List of foreign ministers of Nigeria =

Minister of Foreign Affairs
- Coat of arms of the Nigerian Government

- State flag of Nigeria

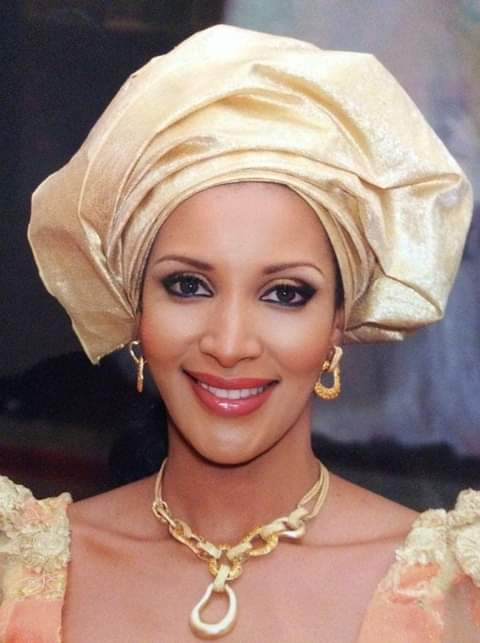
- Incumbent; Bianca Odumegwu-Ojukwu since 30 March 2026
- Federal Ministry of Foreign Affairs
- Member of: Federal Executive Council
- Appointer: The president with Senate advice and consent
- Term length: No fixed term
- Deputy: Minister of State
- Website: foreignaffairs.gov.ng

The minister of foreign affairs of Nigeria is the head of the Federal Ministry of Foreign Affairs and a member of the Federal Executive Council.

The first woman to serve as the Nigerian foreign minister was Ngozi Okonjo-Iweala, who was in the post briefly in 2006.

Political party: NPC NCNC NPP APC PDP Military

Name (Born-Died)		Portrait	Term of Office		Cabinet
First Republic
1	Abubakar Tafawa Balewa (1912–1966)		1 October 1960	17 July 1961	Balewa (I)
2	Jaja Wachuku (1918–1996)		17 July 1961	7 January 1965	Balewa (I)
3	Nuhu Bamalli (1917–2001)		1 December 1965	17 January 1966	Balewa (II)
Military Government (1966–1979)
4	Okoi Arikpo (1916–1995)		3 September 1967	29 July 1975	Gowon (Federal Executive Council)
5	Joseph Nanven Garba (1943–2002)		6 August 1975	July 1978	Muhammed (Federal Executive Council) Obasanjo (Federal Executive Council)
6	Henry Adefope (1926–2012)		July 1978	1979	Obasanjo (Federal Executive Council)
Second Republic
7	Ishaya Audu (1927–2005)		December 1979	October 1983	Shagari (I)
8	Emeka Anyaoku (b. 1933)		October 1983	December 1983	Shagari (II)
Military Government (1983–1993)
9	Ibrahim Gambari (b. 1944)		18 January 1984	27 August 1985	Buhari (Federal Executive Council)
10	Bolaji Akinyemi (b. 1942)		11 September 1985	21 December 1987	Babangida (Federal Executive Council)
11	Ike Nwachukwu (b. 1940)		21 December 1987	30 December 1989	Babangida (Federal Executive Council)
12	Rilwanu Lukman (1938–2014)		30 December 1989	30 August 1990	Babangida (Federal Executive Council)
13	Ike Nwachukwu (b. 1940)		30 August 1990	January 1993	Babangida (Federal Executive Council)
Third Republic (Interim National Government)
14	Matthew Mbu (1929–2012)		4 January 1993	17 November 1993	Shonekan (I)
Military Government (1993–1999)
15	Baba Gana Kingibe (b. 1945)		23 November 1993	20 March 1995	Abacha (Federal Executive Council)
16	Tom Ikimi (b. 1944)		20 March 1995	8 June 1998	Abacha (Federal Executive Council)
17	Ignatius Olisemeka (b. 1932)		20 August 1998	June 1999	Abubakar (Federal Executive Council)
Fourth Republic
18	Sule Lamido (b. 1948)		30 June 1999	May 2003	Obasanjo (I)
19	Oluyemi Adeniji (1934–2017)		8 July 2003	June 2006	Obasanjo (II)
20	Ngozi Okonjo-Iweala (b. 1954)		21 June 2006	4 August 2006 (resigned)	Obasanjo (II)
21	Joy Ogwu (1946–2025)		30 August 2006	29 May 2007	Obasanjo (II)
22	Ojo Maduekwe (1945–2016)		26 July 2007	17 March 2010	Yar'Adua (I)
23	Martin Ihoeghian Uhomoibhi (b. 1954)		17 March 2010 (supervising)	April 2010	Jonathan (I)
24	Henry Odein Ajumogobia (b. 1956)		5 April 2010	9 July 2011	Jonathan (II)
25	Olugbenga Ashiru (1948–2014)		11 July 2011	11 September 2013	Jonathan (II)
26	Viola Onwuliri (b. 1956)		11 September 2013	March 2014	Jonathan (II)
27	Aminu Bashir Wali (b. 1941)		5 March 2014	29 May 2015	Jonathan (II)
28	Geoffrey Onyeama (b. 1956)		11 November 2015	29 May 2023	Buhari (I • II)
29	Yusuf Tuggar (b. 1967)		21 August 2023	30 March 2026	Tinubu (I)
30	Bianca Odumegwu-Ojukwu (b. 1968)		30 March 2026	Incumbent	Tinubu (I)

== See also ==
- Federal Ministry of Foreign Affairs (Nigeria)
