= Angela Cropper =

Trinidad and Tobago politician (1946–2012)

Angela Sarojanie Cropper
- Born: Angela Sarojanie Persad; 1946.
- Died: November 12, 2012 (aged 65–66)
- Spouse: John Cropper
- Children: 1

Angela Sarojanie Cropper (née Persad; 1946 – 12 November 2012) was a Trinidad and Tobago economist who served as assistant secretary-general and deputy executive director of the United Nations Environment Programme (UNEP) and an independent senator. She founded the Cropper Foundation together with her husband John Cropper, and served as its president.

== Early life and education ==
Cropper was born in 1946 in rural Trinidad. She was one of 12 children, and was the first in her family to attend secondary school.

Cropper attended Naparima Girls' High School. After graduating, she attended the University of the West Indies, where she obtained a degree in economics under the mentorship of Lloyd Best.

In the 1980s, Cropper received a law degree from the University of the West Indies at Cave Hill, Barbados.

== Career ==
After graduating from the University of the West Indies, Cropper worked for the Caribbean Industrial Research Institute (CARIRI) as a research officer.

Cropper contested the 1976 general elections as a Tapia House Movement candidate for Arouca. She later established a retail business in partnership with Jeremy Mar, before returning to university pursuing a law degree.

Cropper was an independent senator in the Parliament of Trinidad and Tobago and president of the Cropper Foundation, a not-for-profit charitable organization committed to sustainable development. She shared the 2005 Zayed International Prize for the Environment with Emil Salim, the former Indonesian minister for population and the environment.

She served in various capacities with the Caribbean Community and Common Market Secretariat (CARICOM) and the World Conservation Union (IUCN). She was interim Executive Secretary of the United Nations Convention on Biological Diversity and Senior Adviser on Environment and Development with the United Nations Development Programme (UNDP).

She also served on a number of international advisory boards, including the CARICOM Task Force on Functional Cooperation, the Council of the United Nations University, the European Union High-Level Panel on Sustainability, the Board of Trustees of the Stockholm Environment Institute, and the External Advisory Group to the World Bank on the implementation of its forest strategy. She was a Visiting Distinguished Fellow with the Woods Hole Research Center, and a Visiting Distinguished Fellow and McCluskey Fellow with the Yale School of Forestry and Environmental Studies.

Cropper was appointed to the position of assistant secretary-general and deputy executive director of the United Nations Environment Programme (UNEP) by United Nations Secretary-General Ban Ki-moon in November 2007.

== Personal life ==
Angela Cropper met her husband, John Cropper, an agricultural economist, while she worked at CARIRI as a research officer. They had one child, Devanand, who died of heart disease in 1998 at the age of 20.

In December 2001, Cropper's husband, John, her sister Lynette Lithgow, and her mother Maggie Lee, were murdered at the family home in Cascade, Port of Spain, in an apparent robbery. Two men, Lester Pitman and Daniel Agard, were convicted on 14 July 2004, and sentenced to death. Lester Pitman's sentence was later reduced to 40 years imprisonment.

Cropper died of cancer on 12 November 2012 in London, at the home of her brother Ken Persad.
