= Isawa (sect) =

Islamic sect in Nigeria

Isawa, also known as the Bani Isra'ila, was an Islamic sect that originated in the Sokoto Caliphate (today in Northern Nigeria) that believed Isa (Jesus) to be the greatest among the prophets of Islam. They rejected the hadiths and traditional Islamic practices such as Ramadan fasting and the hajj, adhering instead to a strictly Qur'an-based doctrine. They considered themselves the true Ahl-al-Kitab ("People of the Book"), and believed that they preserved the purity of the original revelation before it was corrupted by Judaism and Christianity. The sect has played an influential role in the early Christian conversion movements in Northern Nigeria, with some members and their children becoming important figures in Nigerian politics and society.

== Name ==
The followers of this group called themselves the Bani Isra'ila ('the Children of the Israelites'). However, the group is most commonly known as the Isawa ('followers of Isa').

== Under the Sokoto Caliphate ==
Decades after the establishment of the Sokoto Caliphate and its various emirates, discontent grew in the region. In some emirates, like Zaria, the peasantry ('talakawa') suffered from severe taxation and incessant slave-raiding. The mallams (Islamic scholars) also viewed the Emirs and their councillors as neglecting their religious obligations, such as the construction and maintenance of mosques, in pursuit of power and material wealth. This discontent was particularly prevalent among the Hausa mallams. This resulted in the rise of several religious movements that rejected the central authority of Sokoto, such as the Tijanniyya led by Modibbo Raji, and the Mahdiyya led by Hayatu bin Sa'id.

=== Reign of Emir of Kano Usman (1846–1855) ===
In the Kano Emirate, Tsakuwa, a town southeast of Kano City, became a center for these scholars. The mallams established a flourishing weaving and dyeing industry to support themselves and attracted pupils from far and wide. In the mid-1840s, one of these mallams, Hamza, questioned Al-Kharaj, the main Muslim tithe, and led a revolt against the land tax ('kurdin kasa') imposed by Kano.

The tax revolt was taken seriously in Kano, as the tax constituted the bulk of the emirate's revenue. After tax officials ('jakadu') were beaten and sent back, news of the revolt reached Galadima Abdullahi, who instructed that all dissidents be brought to Kano. Receiving a warning beforehand, Hamza fled Tsakuwa with fifteen pupils to the Ningi hills in the Bauchi Emirate. Known for his skills in siḥr (magic), Hamza was believed to have the power to rise on his mat, resurrect fried ants, and make charms that granted immunity in battle. Using this reputation, he formed a small army of slave-raiding hill-men and became a focal point for resentment against the Caliphate. His rallying cry was said to be:

Follow me and I will save you from the service of these tyrant Fulanis who use you and ask you for what you cannot do.

By the mid-1860s, Hamza's followers and descendants had founded a powerful slave-raiding force in the Ningi hills which was to threaten the Kano, Zaria, and Bauchi emirates for the rest of the century.

Another of the Tsakuwa mallams was Ibrahim. Around the time of Hamza's flight, Ibrahim left the town and moved to Kano City. He was born in Kargi (now a district in Kubau), near Soba in the Zaria Emirate. His scholarly pursuits led him to Tsakuwa, where he married, and later to Dugel, where he studied under Mallam Dodo. He also likely interacted with the court mallams from Zaria. The Emir of Kano, Usman dan Dabo, is said to have summoned Ibrahim and acknowledged his religious expertise, particularly in tafsir (Quranic exegesis). Ibrahim was reportedly called to appear before the Emir dressed in a riga and turban, carrying "a sword and spear, his club and staff, and with shoes on his feet." According to historian Professor Ian Linden, it is unclear what Ibrahim taught, but the Emir accepted his teachings, allegedly stating, "This is indeed the helper, ansar, of religion; you should go and receive him."

=== Reign of Emir of Kano Abdullahi (1855–1883) ===
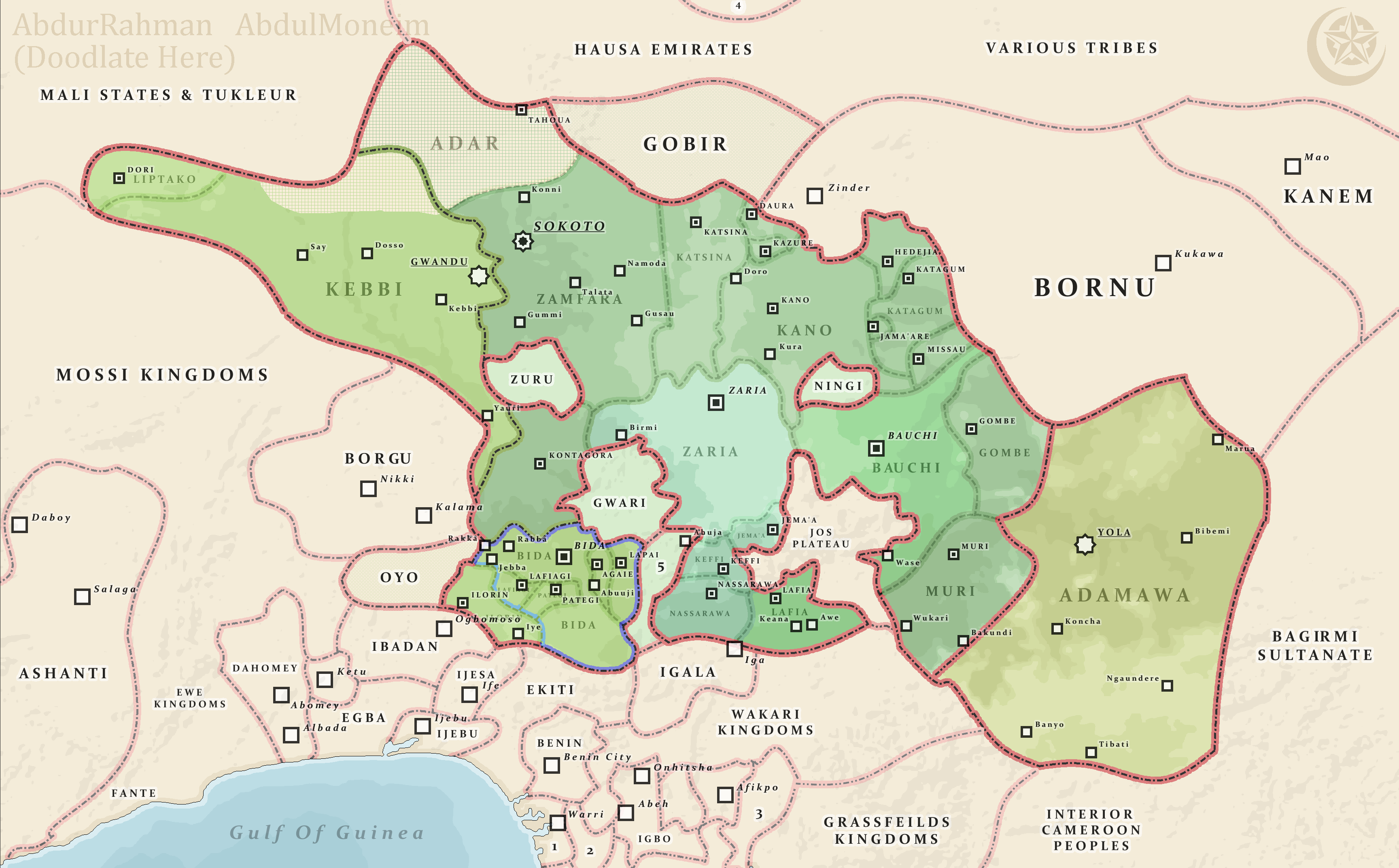
Map of the Sokoto Caliphate in 1870. Ningi can be seen completely surrounded by the Kano, Zaria, and Bauchi Emirates.

According to the Kano Chronicle, Usman was remembered as a generous and forgiving ruler, during whose reign the mallams "obtained great honour." However, his younger brother, Galadima Abdullahi, who had been the de facto ruler, was unlike Usman. After Usman's death in 1855, Abdullahi succeeded him as the Emir of Kano. He was said to have continued studying with Mallam Ibrahim and "agreed with this mallam" until around 1867.

Mallam Ibrahim continued to receive titles and was turbanned. Some traditions claim that Ibrahim harboured militant Mahdist influences, with people saying, "they were leaned against the porch wall like the Prophet Moses used to do," and that he was collecting arms to take over the town. Others suggest that Sokoto pressured Emir Abdullahi to have Ibrahim killed, claiming the Caliph refused to marry his daughter to Abdullahi until Ibrahim was disposed of.

For about a decade, Hamza's war band in Ningi grew in strength and regularly raided Kano. In 1867, they launched a raid so devastating that Abdullahi captured Mallam Ibrahim and had him impaled on a stake in Kurmi market for his connection to Ningi through Tsakuwa. According to Ningi traditions, Ibrahim reportedly refused to recite the shahada and denied that Muhammad was the final prophet. Whether Abdullahi disposed of Ibrahim due to the pressure from Sokoto is not known.

=== At the Caliphate's periphery ===
Several of Ibrahim's followers were imprisoned in Gwale, while the rest fled Kano City. Some settled in Gumel, and others moved to Ningi by the early 1870s. The remaining followers went on to found forty villages east of Kano, where they were welcomed by Hamza's successor, Mallam Haruna. By the reign of Ningi's chief, Gajiri, in 1885, Ibrahim's followers—who now called themselves the Banisra'ila ("the Children of the Israelites")—had firmly established themselves in Ningi. The group even managed to make their beliefs the official religion of the court. It was said that the troops, many of whom were former escaped slaves, prayed in any direction rather than toward Mecca.

Despite their growing influence, a coup by one of the military commanders led to their expulsion from Ningi in 1890. Some fled north, while others moved to the region near Ibrahim's home, close to Soba in Zaria. Two of the mallams who fled Ningi, Yahuza and Yahaya, settled in the walled village of Turawa, about 25 miles from Zaria City. Mallam Ali, the son of a wealthy Bornu farmer-trader, became Yahaya's patron and married his daughter, Habiba, to him, along with a plot of land. Ali had returned from Islamic studies in Kano and likely first encountered the Banisra'ila mallams at a flourishing local school in Kawuri, where over sixty pupils studied.

Habiba gave birth to Bulus Audu, and for three years, Yahaya taught his son all he knew of the Banisra'ila teachings. To escape the arrival of British colonial forces at the turn of the century, Yahaya moved to Hadejia, where he gained some followers. Bulus Audu remained in Turawa and, by the mid-1920s, had become the leading scholar of the Banisra'ila in Zaria.

== Under colonial rule ==
The Northern Nigeria Protectorate was established by British colonial forces in 1900 and, by 1903, had firmly taken control of the entire region, subjugating the Sokoto Caliphate and its emirates. Christian missionaries from Britain began settling in the protectorate and were somewhat tolerated by the colonial administrators. However, their activities were restricted by Frederick Lugard, the High Commissioner of Northern Nigeria, who sought to ensure the loyalty of the protectorate's Emirs and feared that missionary proselytizing might jeopardise that.

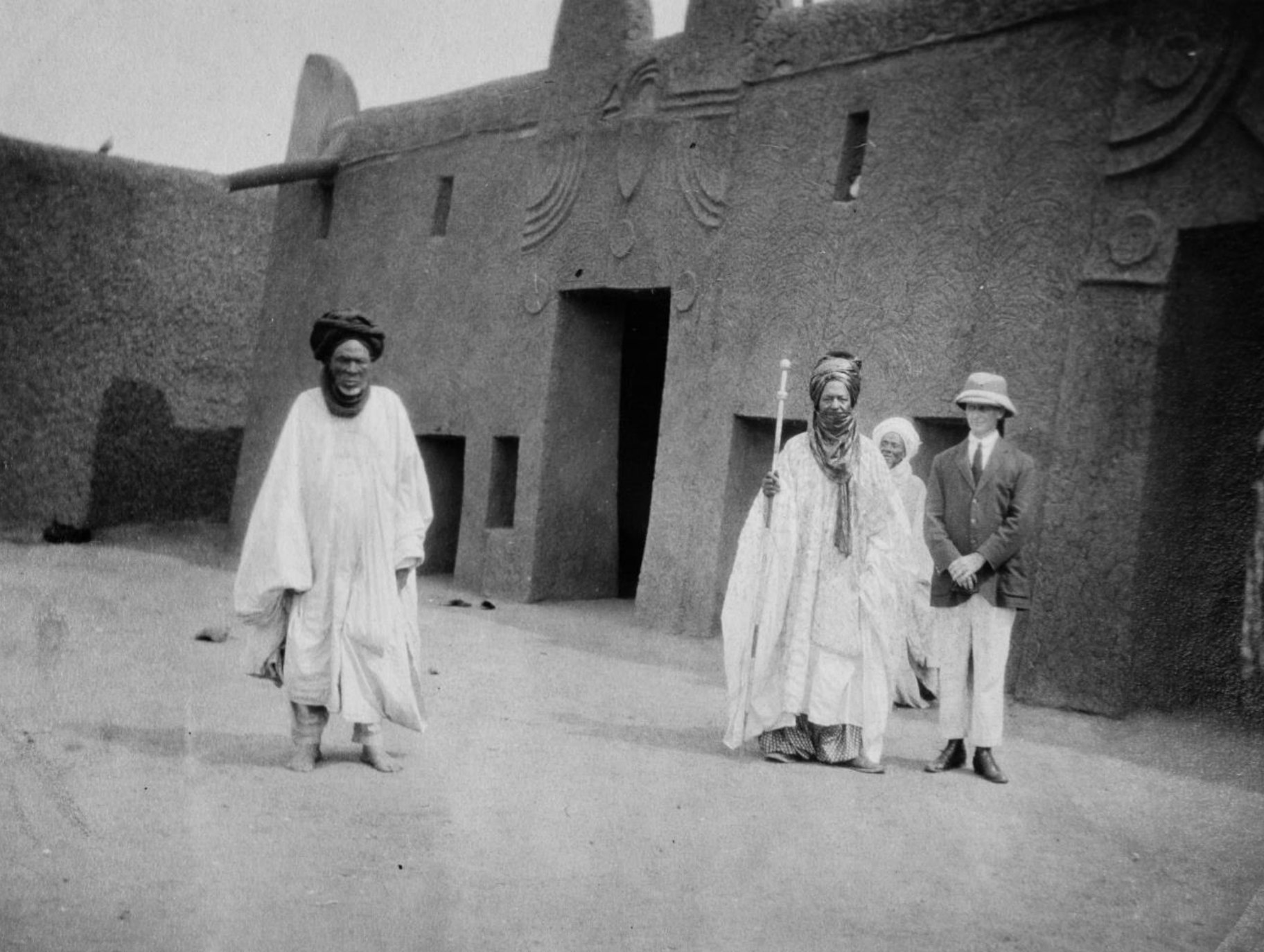
Emir Aliyu (r. 1903–1920) with Dr Walter Miller

The Church Mission Society (CMS), led by Walter Miller, a close ally of Lugard, was permitted to establish a mission compound in Zaria City. When news of the arrival of Christian Europeans reached the Isawa, many were eager to meet them and learn more about Isa (Jesus). However, Mallam Yahaya refused to allow any contact with the missionaries, fearing it would anger the Emirs. It was only after his death in 1913 that his son, Bulus Audu, sent a delegation to meet Miller. After the meeting, the missionaries were left shocked. Dr. Miller reportedly knelt down and prayed: "God, I thank you that your servants are hidden. I am thankful that you have heeded my prayers. I thank you that you have found this, your people."

Word quickly spread among the Isawa, who at the time had around 160 followers scattered across small villages on the outskirts of the Zaria and Kano emirates. By Christmas 1913, 22 older men, 3 boys, and 7 women were frequent visitors of Miller, where he instructed them from the Bible. This encounter thrust the sect into the politics of the emirates and colonial administration. The Resident in Zaria was informed, and Zaria's Emir, Aliyu dan Sidi, feared that his religious authority could be undermined by the group's presence. Their historical ties with Ningi further convinced the Emir of their potential danger.

The growth of the Christian population in Zaria prompted Miller to push for the establishment of a new settlement to accommodate the converts. Throughout January 1914, the Isawa mallams were busy clearing the bush in an area they had chosen in preparation for building the settlement. Emir Aliyu eventually found out and ordered them to stop after detaining them for four days. The acting Lieutenant-Governor of the North, Herbert Goldsmith, described the Isawa to Lugard as secessionist Mahdists, similar to the rebels of the Satiru revolt of 1906. Despite these concerns, Lugard, who was a close friend of Miller, allowed the settlement to be established but placed it under the careful supervision of the Sarkin Yaki, an official of the Emir. As a result, Gimi (now in Makarfi, Kaduna State) was founded, with the condition that Muslims were also permitted to settle there. Goldsmith, however, never really changed his mind:

"the presence of the Hausa Mission in Zaria will always…be a danger, and will always provide a ready handle for any seditious agitator who endeavours to arouse the fanaticism of his co-religionists against the Government"

By early 1915, a community of about 120 men, women, and children had settled in Gimi, with Bulus Audu serving as the village headman. A school and a church were established, along with a successful sugar enterprise to make Gimi self-sufficient. However, a famine in the emirate, combined with outbreaks of Spanish influenza and sleeping sickness, hindered the community's growth. From a population of 150 in 1918, it dwindled to 50 by 1921.

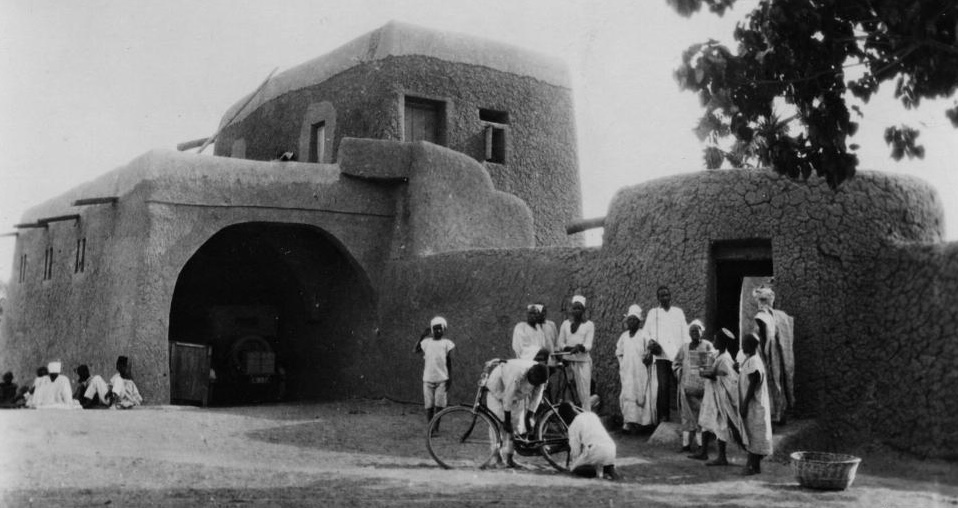
Entrance to the Church Mission Societycompound in Zaria City

After the source of the infection was traced to the River Galma, where the community drew water, it was decided to relocate. Miller requested a new site for the community, but both the Emir and the Resident opposed the request. Many of the Isawa left for other settlements, including a return to the Zaria mission, while the remainder stayed in Gimi. In 1929, Christian missionaries were eventually forced out of Zaria City and permitted to establish a new settlement outside the city. Miller reluctantly agreed, founding the town of Wusasa, which was viewed as a second Gimi. By this time, several of the Isawa Christians had reverted to Islam or returned to their Israelite faith.

== Legacy ==
The Isawa formed a significant portion of the early Christian converts in Northern Nigeria. Consequently, they were the main beneficiaries of the education provided by missionary schools. This was particularly important during the early decades of colonial Northern Nigeria, as unlike in the South, western education was limited to members of the sarauta (ruling class). This enabled the children of the Isawa converts, using the education they received at Wusasa, to play important roles in Nigeria's future, particularly during the early years of decolonisation in the 1950s and 1960s.

Bulus Audu's son, Ishaya, became one of the most influential 20th-century Christian politicians from the still largely Muslim North. Other influential Wusasa alumni include Yakubu Gowon, R.A.B. Dikko, and T.Y. Danjuma. The school later educated Muslim students as well, including an Emir of Zazzau.

Although their numbers have greatly diminished, there were still some members of the sect in settlements between Zaria and Kano as of 1975.

== Beliefs and teachings ==
Much of the teachings and beliefs of the sect were established by Mallam Ibrahim in the 1840s. Due to his status as a respected scholar of the Qur'an, his ideas were tolerated for a while. Although he introduced new interpretations of the holy book, he continued to emphasise the importance of the Qur'an for 'true Islam'. He argued that principles such as ijma (consensus) and qiyas (analogy) were flawed, claiming they were merely the proud opinions of created men. They also rejected Ramadan and the hajj as 'hypocritical and self-serving'. Fasting was done on an individual basis, typically at some point during the week. The Qur'an was all that mattered to the Isawa, with some of their leaders claiming to have special revelations regarding the meanings of certain Qur'anic passages.

=== Possible influences ===
Little is known about the texts that influenced the early Isawa, apart from the Qur'an. According to Ian Linden, the sect may have been influenced by Christian scriptures, which became more accessible at the time due to the large community of Arab traders in Kano. However, Linden points out that this contradicts the "sect's simple Qur'an-alone piety". He added that the simplest explanation is that the relative isolation of the sect allowed for the spontaneous development of ideas about Isa after hearing about the Christian Gospels from traders.

The sect's name, Bani Isra'ila, reflects a tradition in West Africa of identifying with the spiritual descendants of the original Israelites. The Isawa believed they were the true Ahl al-Kitab ('People of the Book') and saw themselves as preserving the purity of the original revelation before it was corrupted by Judaism and Christianity.

=== Views on Christianity ===
The Isawa believed that Isa was superior to Muhammad, seeing Muhammad as merely rasul Allah ('messenger of Allah') while Isa was ruhu'llah ('spirit of Allah'). They maintained that the Qur'an affirms Isa's virgin birth, sinlessness, miraculous powers, status as the word and spirit of Allah, his exalted character, and his return to judge the world. However, they rejected the Christian belief that Isa was the son of God or that he was actually killed. This rejection, according to missiologist Dean S Gilliland,:

...introduces an irony into their relationship with Christians because while they are hospitable to Christians and do not refuse to listen to the way Christians talk about their Jesus, they do not consider the Christian information on God and Jesus as truth. The Isawa are as closed to biblical teachings as are Muslims; perhaps they are even more negative about non-Qur'anic sources because of their self-conscious separation from the institutional dogma of Islam.

Even among some Christian converts, the Qur'an was not completely rejected. A notable example was Bulus Audu, who "preached Christianity with a Bible in one hand and the Qur'an in the other", giving equal respect to both holy books. For him, Jesus was as much the spirit of God found in the Qur'an as he was in biblical Christology.
