= Obasi =

- Gender: Male
- Language: Igbo

Origin
- Origin: Nigerian
- Meaning: The Almighty God who resides in the heavens
- Region of origin: South East, Nigeria

Obasi audio is a Nigerian surname. It is a male name and of Igbo origin. It is an appellation "Obasi bi n'igwe" which means "The Almighty God who resides in the heavens". An Igbo pronunciation of the name of the supreme deity, Abbassi, of the Efik-Ibibio group adopted by the Igbos.

== Notable individuals with the name ==
- C. J. Obasi, Nigerian film director, screenwriter and editor
- Chinedu Obasi (born 1986), Nigerian footballer
- Onua Obasi (born 1988), British footballer
- Patty Obasi (1951–2012), Nigerian gospel recording artist
- Victoria Adaobi Obasi (born 1952), Nigerian professor
- Onyebuchi Obasi (born 2005), Nigerian professional footballer
- Godwin Obasi (1933–2007), Nigerian meteorologist
- Obasi Igwe (born 1948), Nigerian professor of political science
