= Shridath Ramphal =

Guyanese diplomat (1928–2024)

The Honourable Sir Shridath Ramphal GCMG AC ONZ OE OCC NIIV OM KC FRSA
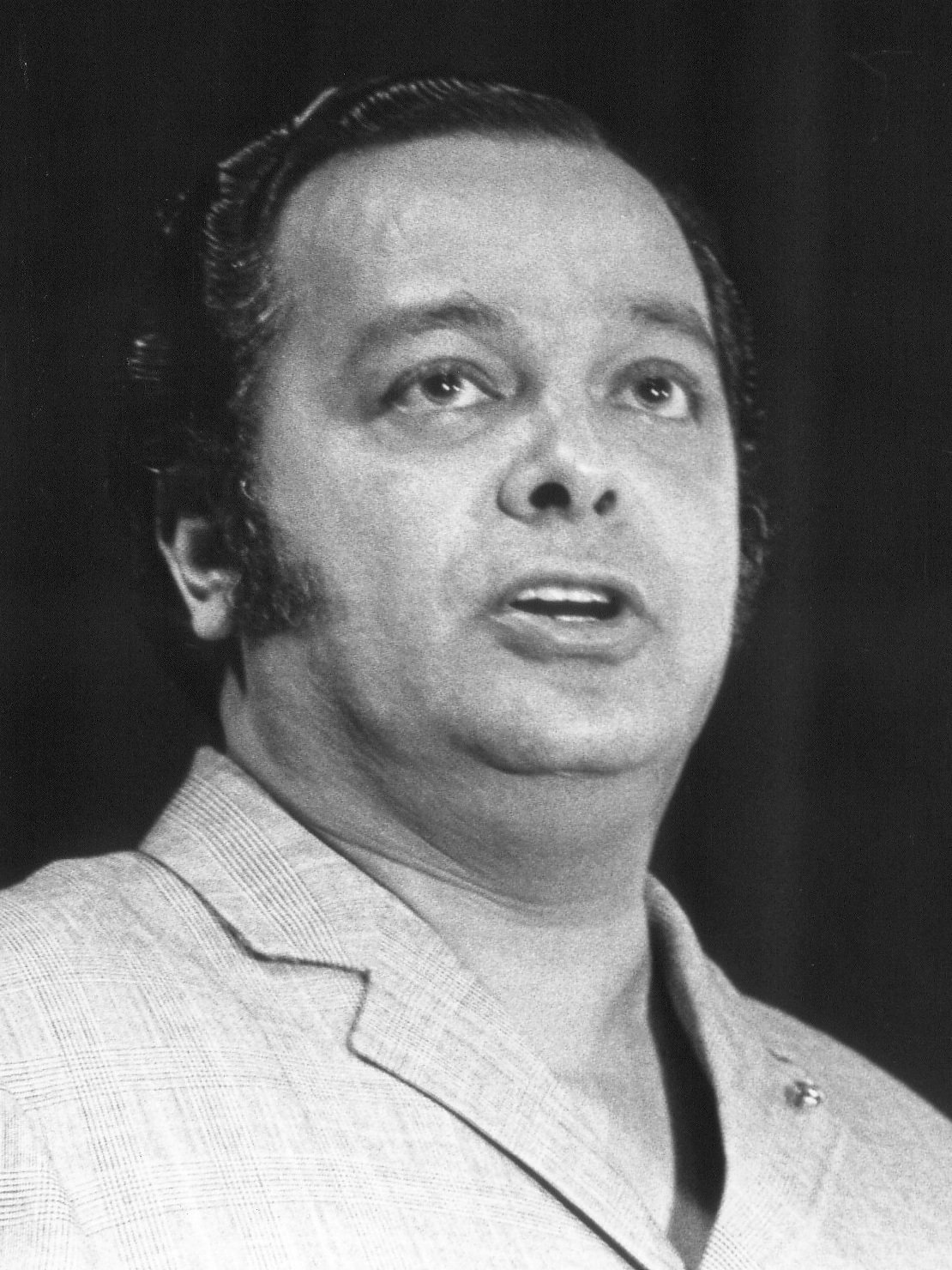
- Ramphal in 1975

2nd Secretary-General of the Commonwealth of Nations
- In office 1 July 1975 – 30 June 1990
- Head: Elizabeth II
- Preceded by: Arnold Smith
- Succeeded by: Chief Emeka Anyaoku

2nd Minister of Foreign Affairs of Guyana
- In office 1972–1975
- Prime Minister: Forbes Burnham
- Preceded by: Forbes Burnham
- Succeeded by: Frederick Wills

1st Assistant Attorney General of the West Indies Federation
- In office 3 January 1958 – 31 May 1962

Chancellor of the University of the West Indies
- In office 1989–2003
- Preceded by: Allen Montgomery Lewis
- Succeeded by: George Alleyne

Chancellor of the University of Warwick
- In office 1989–2002
- Preceded by: Leslie Scarman, Baron Scarman
- Succeeded by: Nick Scheele

Chancellor of the University of Guyana
- In office 1990–1992

Personal details
- Born: 3 October 1928 New Amsterdam, Berbice, British Guiana (present-day East Berbice-Corentyne, Guyana)
- Died: 30 August 2024 (aged 95)
- Spouse: Lois Winifred King (m. 1951; died 2019)
- Children: 4
- Education: Harvard Law School
- Alma mater: King's College London (LL.B., LL.M.)

Sir Shridath Surendranath Ramphal GCMG AC ONZ OE OCC NIIV OM KC FRSA (3 October 1928 – 30 August 2024), often known as Sir Sonny Ramphal, was a Guyanese politician who was the second Commonwealth Secretary-General, holding the position from 1975 to 1990. He was also the foreign minister of Guyana from 1972 to 1975, and assistant attorney general of the West Indies Federation from 1958 to 1962.

Ramphal was an Earth Charter International Commission member.

== Biography ==
Ramphal was born in New Amsterdam, British Guiana, to an Indo-Guyanese family, and was the eldest of the five children of Grace and Jimmy Ramphal, a Presbyterian schoolteacher and pioneer of secondary education in the colony, who later became the first Guyanese person to be appointed to a government post when he was made a commissioner in the department of labour soon after the outbreak of the Second World War. One of his grandmothers left British India after refusing to commit sati and immigrated to British Guiana under the Indian indenture system. After attending schools in Georgetown, Ramphal studied law at King's College London, graduating with LL.B. and LL.M. degrees. He was called to the bar at Gray's Inn in London in 1951. As a pupil barrister he worked with the British politician and lawyer Dingle Foot. Ramphal continued studying law for a year at Harvard Law School in the US on a 1962 Guggenheim Fellowship.

Ramphal started his legal career as a Crown Counsel in the Attorney-General's Office in 1953, becoming Solicitor-General and then Assistant Attorney-General of the short-lived West Indies Federation. After a period in private practice in Jamaica, he returned to British Guiana in 1965 to be the Attorney General. Two years later, he was also appointed Minister of State in the Ministry of External Affairs, later becoming Minister of Justice (from 1973) and Minister of Foreign Affairs (from 1972). In 1975, he left Guyana to become Commonwealth Secretary-General.

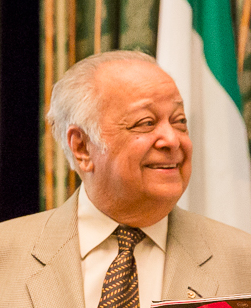
Ramphal in 2015

He also served as the Chancellor of the University of Warwick from 1989 to 2002, of the University of the West Indies from 1989 to 2003, and of the University of Guyana from 1990 to 1992.

During Ramphal's time as Commonwealth Secretary-General, the United Kingdom represented by Margaret Thatcher was found to be in a minority of one on the issue of economic sanctions against apartheid South Africa.

With Ingvar Carlsson, he was in 1995 one of the co-chairs of the Commission on Global Governance, which reported on issues of international development, international security, globalization and global governance.

Ramphal died on 30 August 2024, at the age of 95.

== Selected bibliography ==
- Inseparable Humanity: An Anthology of Reflections (Hansib, 1988)
- Triumph for UNCLOS: The Guyana-Suriname Maritime Arbitration (Hansib, 2008)
- Caribbean Challenges: Sir Shridath Ramphal's Collected Counsel (Hansib, 2012)

== Honours and awards ==
Ramphal was appointed a Companion of the Order of St Michael and St George (CMG) in the 1966 Birthday Honours. He was knighted in the 1970 New Year Honours, and invested with his knighthood by the Queen at Buckingham Palace on 3 February. He was appointed Knight Grand Cross of the Order of St Michael and St. George (GCMG) in 1990.

On 26 February 1982, Ramphal was appointed an honorary Companion of the Order of Australia (AC). On 6 February 1990, Ramphal was the 19th appointee to the Order of New Zealand, New Zealand's highest civil honour. He was decorated as a Member of the Order of the Caribbean Community (OCC) in the first conferment in 1992. In May 2006 Ramphal was appointed an Honorary Fellow of Royal Society of Arts. He was a vice-president of the Royal Commonwealth Society. The Ramphal Building at the University of Warwick was named in his honour.

In 2002, Rampal was awarded the Indira Gandhi Peace Prize. In 2003, he was awarded the Pravasi Bharatiya Samman by the President of India.

== In popular culture ==
Ramphal is portrayed by Tony Jayawardena in the fourth season of the Netflix web television series The Crown.

Political offices
Preceded by Arnold Smith	Secretary-General for the Commonwealth; 1975–1990	Succeeded by Chief Emeka Anyaoku
Academic offices
Preceded by Baron Scarman	Chancellor of the University of Warwick; 1989–2002	Succeeded by Nick Scheele
