= Adaobi =

Nigerian (Igbo) given name

- Gender: Female
- Language: Igbo

Origin
- Origin: Nigeria
- Meaning: daughter of the community/heart
- Region of origin: Igboland

Other names
- Short form: Ada

Adaobi // is a feminine given name of Igbo origin. It combines àda ("first daughter," but also an honorific for daughters more broadly) and òbi/obì ("gathering place" and "heart" respectively).

== Notable people with this name ==
- Victoria Adaobi Obasi, Past Vice chancellor of Imo State University
- Adaobi Tricia Nwaubani, Nigerian novelist, humorist, essayist and journalist
- Adaobi Okah, Nigerian footballer
