= Adefope =

- Gender: Male
- Language: Yoruba

Origin
- Origin: Nigerian
- Meaning: The crown or royalty shows gratitude.
- Region of origin: South West, Nigeria

Adéfọpẹ́ is a Nigerian surname of Yoruba origin, typically given to males. It means “The crown or royalty shows gratitude".

== Notable individuals with the name ==
- Henry Adefope (1926–2012), Nigerian politician
- Lolly Adefope (born 1990), English stand-up comedian and actress
