= Bali Moniaga =

Indonesian diplomat (born 1953)

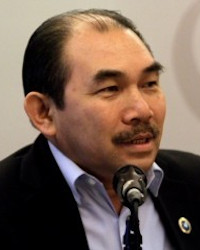

Ambassador of Indonesia to Brazil
- In office 18 October 2006 – 2010
- President: Susilo Bambang Yudhoyono
- Preceded by: Piter Taruyu Vau
- Succeeded by: Sudaryomo Hartosudarmo

Personal details
- Born: 31 August 1953 (age 73) Balikpapan, Indonesia
- Spouse: Lina Janti Moniaga
- Education: Padjadjaran University (Drs.)

Bali Moniaga (born 31 August 1953) is an Indonesian retired diplomat who last served as ambassador to Brazil from 2007 to 2010 and deputy for law and cooperation of the National Narcotics Board from 2012 to 2013. He previously served as director of Africa within the foreign department from 2002 to 2006.

== Early life and education ==
Bali Moniaga was born in Balikpapan on 31 August 1953. He studied international relations at the Padjadjaran University in Bandung, West Java, from 1973 until graduating with a bachelor's degree 1979.

== Diplomatic career ==
Moniaga began his foreign service in 1980. His first post was a provisional role as head of section responsible for bilateral relations with countries in Central America and the Caribbean at the politics directorate general, a position he held from 1980 to 1984. During this period, he underwent basic diplomatic training from 1981 to 1982. He then interned at the permanent mission in Geneva, Switzerland, with the rank of attache from 1985. He was promoted to the diplomatic rank of second secretary at the same mission, where he handled multilateral economic and trade affairs. He returned to Indonesia in 1989 as chief of international trade and finance affairs within the directorate of multilateral economic cooperation, serving until 1991. During his time in Geneva and as a section chief, he participated in GATT's Uruguay Round from 1986 to 1990.

Moniaga completed mid-level diplomatic education in 1990. He was then posted to the embassy in London with the rank of first secretary from 1991 to 1995. He was responsible for economic affairs, trade, investment relations, and commodities. In London, he studied at the Diplomatic Academy of London of the University of Westminster from 1992 to 1994. He also attended various conferences, training sessions, and meetings for organizations such as the International Coffee Organization (ICO), International Cocoa Organization (ICCO), the International Rubber Study Group (IRSG), and the International Sugar Organization (ISO).

From 1995 to 1999, Moniaga served as the deputy director (chief of subdirectorate) for Asia Pacific Economic Cooperation (APEC) affairs at the foreign department. As deputy director, Moniaga attended a number of APEC related summits, events, and conferences, such as 6th APEC Leaders Summit in Vancouver, Canada, in November 1997; The 7th APEC Leaders Summit in Kuala Lumpur, Malaysia, in November 1998; and The 8th APEC Leaders Summit in Auckland, New Zealand, in September 1999. He also completed his senior diplomatic training in 1996.

Moniaga was assigned overseas to the permanent mission to the United Nations in New York, United States, with the diplomatic rank of counsellor, and later minister-counsellor, from October 1999 to 2002. Moniaga dealt with issues concerning committees 3 and 5 of the UN General Assembly and election affairs. While in New York, he also participated in significant UN conferences, including The 23rd Special Session of the GA on Gender Equality, Development and Peace in the 20th Century (Beijing + 5) in June 2000, the United Nations Millennium Summit 2000 in September 2000, The 24th Special Session on Social Development in a Globalizing World (Copenhagen + 5) in June 2000, and the United Nations Special Session on HIV/AIDS in May 2001.

In light of organizational restructuring within the foreign department, on 3 May 2002 Moniaga was sworn in as the director of Africa. He briefly became acting director general of Asia, Pacific, and Africa in late 2002 during the absence of the permanent director general Makarim Wibisono. In his capacity as director, he was involved in key meetings related to Asian-African cooperation, including the AASROC I (Asian-African Sub Regional Organizations Conference) in Bandung, 29–30 June 2004, where he became the secretary; AASROC II in Durban, 20 August 2004; and the Asian-African Summit (KTT AA) and the Commemoration of the 50th Anniversary of the 1955 Asian-African Conference in Jakarta and Bandung, 18–25 April 2005. He also played a role in negotiating the releasing nine ship crews who were taken hostage by Somalian pirates in 2006.

On 18 October 2006, Moniaga was installed as ambassador to Brazil. He presented his credentials to the President of Brazil Luiz Inácio Lula da Silva on 23 February 2007. During his tenure, in 2008 President Susilo Bambang Yudhoyono visited Brazil. Moniaga, who served until 2010, was credited with his "active role in building the new partnership" between Indonesia and Brazil by the foreign department.

After serving in the foreign department, Moniaga joined the National Narcotics Board and served as deputy for law and cooperation from 2012 to 2013. Despite his short term, Moniaga managed to struck agreement with various parties on narcotic inspection, including with the Prosperous Justice Party and the United Development Party parliamentary group within the House of Representatives as well as the Fiji police. Moniaga then became the advisor (expert staff) to the National Narcotics Board for legal and foreign affairs in September 2013. As advisor, Moniaga staunchly opposed calls from the United Nations and the International Narcotics Control Board to abolish the death sentence for drug-related offenses, stating that the method of punishment for drug-related offenses is outside the organization's jurisdiction. He argued that the death sentence is required as Indonesia was in a state of narcotics emergency.

== Personal life ==
Moniaga is married to Lina Janti Moniaga. His daughter, Renita, followed his footsteps as a diplomat.
