= Zayed Prize =

The Zayed Prize may refer to:

- The Zayed Future Energy Prize
- The Zayed International Prize for the Environment
