= Order of the Caribbean Community =

Honour awarded by CARICOM

- Insignia of the Order of the Caribbean Community
- Type: Single class regional award
- Awarded for: distinguished, outstanding and phenomenal legacy in the economic, political, social and cultural metamorphoses of Caribbean society
- Presented by: Caribbean Community
- Eligibility: Caribbean nationals
- Post-nominals: OCC
- Status: Currently awarded
- Established: 1987
- First award: 1992

Highlights
- Total: 28

Precedence
- Next (higher): none
- Next (lower): none

The Order of the Caribbean Community is an award given to

"Caribbean nationals whose legacy in the economic, political, social and cultural metamorphoses of Caribbean society is phenomenal"

The award was initiated at the Eighth (8th) Conference of Heads of State and Governments of CARICOM in 1987 and began bestowal in 1992. Decisions as to award are taken by the Advisory Committee for the Order of the Caribbean Community

The Insignia of the O.C.C. set in gold and the Ribbon of the Order are presented to those honoured.

== Privileges and entitlements ==
There are some privileges and entitlements invested upon the recipients. Some of these are as follows:

- The award confers the styling The Honourable upon the recipient and Post-nominals O.C.C.
- Members of the Order are accorded the privilege of free movement among Member States of the Community and are issued with a travel document which is assigned similar status to a diplomatic passport.
- The right to reside in and be gainfully employed in any Member State, as well as the right to acquire and dispose of property, as would citizens of Member States, are entitlements granted to Members of the Order.

== Recipients ==
- William Gilbert Demas, 1992
- Sir Shridath Surendranath Ramphal, 1992
- Sir Derek Alton Walcott, 1992
- Dame Nita Barrow, 1994
- Justice Philip Telford Georges, 1994
- Sir Meredith Alister McIntyre, 1994
- The Rt. Hon. Michael Norman Manley, 1994
- The Rt. Hon. Vere Cornwall Bird, 1998
- Arthur Napoleon Raymond Robinson, 1998
- Sir Philip Manderson Sherlock, 1998
- Sir Garfield Sobers, 1998
- Sir George Alleyne, 2001
- The Rt. Hon. George Cadle Price, 2001
- Slinger Francisco (The Mighty Sparrow), 2001
- Dame Eugenia Charles, 2002
- The Rt. Hon. Sir John Compton, 2002
- Lloyd Best, 2002
- Professor the Honourable Ralston 'Rex' Nettleford, 2008
- The Honourable George Lamming, 2008
- Brian Charles Lara, 2008
- His Excellency Dr. Nicholas Joseph Orville Liverpool, 2008
- Sir Edwin Carrington, KCN, TC, CM 2011
- His Excellency Kamaluddin Mohammed, 2012
- Professor the Honourable Kevin Dion Cavendish, 2019
- Sir Viv Richards, 2022
- Dame Billie Miller, 2022
- Ambassador Irwin LaRocque, 2022
- David Michael Rudder, 2022
- Sir Clive Hubert Lloyd, 2024
