= Okoi Arikpo =

Nigerian politician/lawyer

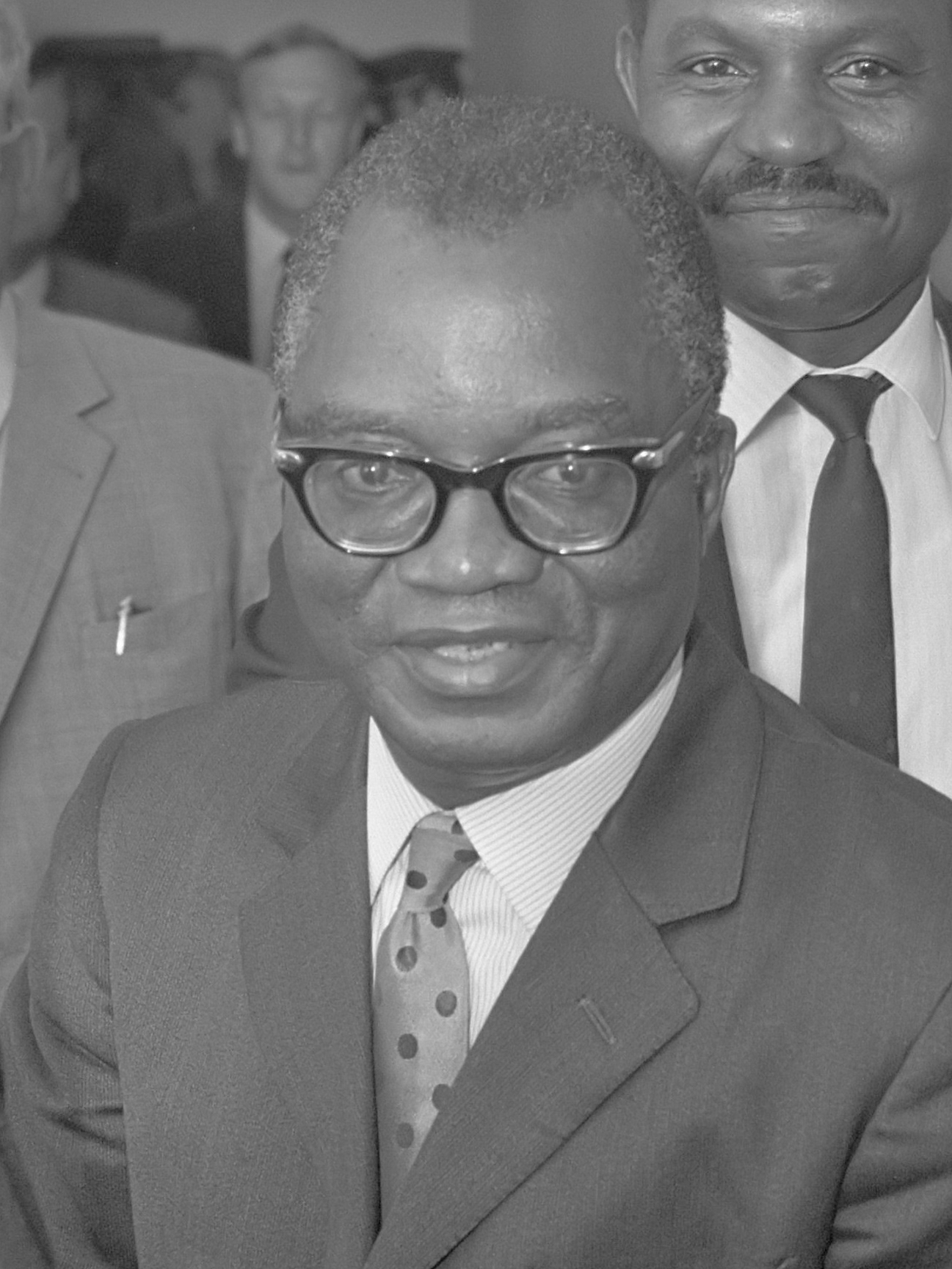
- Okoi Arikpo (1969)

Minister for Foreign Affairs
- In office 3 September 1967 – 29 July 1975
- President: Yakubu Gowon
- Preceded by: Nuhu Bamalli
- Succeeded by: Joseph Nanven Garba

Personal details
- Born: 20 September 1916 Ugep, Southern Region, British Nigeria (now in Cross River State, Nigeria)
- Died: 26 October 1995 (aged 79) Nigeria
- Education: Hope Waddell Training Institution; Government College, Umuahia; Yaba College

Okoi Arikpo (20 September 1916 – 26 October 1995) was a Nigerian chemist, anthropologist, lawyer, politician and diplomat. He served as the longest serving foreign minister of Nigeria from 1967 - 1975.

== Early life ==
Okoi Arikpo was born in Ugep in 1916. He was educated at the famous Hope Waddell Training Institution, and Government College, Umuahia. He studied at Yaba Higher College, Lagos. Then, he attended the University of London, where he was awarded a First Class Degree in Chemistry. He earned an M.Sc in Anthropology and obtained a PhD at The University College, London. He later studied Law and was called to the English bar in 1956. He authored many books including the classic The Development of Modern Nigeria (1967). He was reputed to be the first West African to be awarded a Doctor of Philosophy Degree in Anthropology.

Arikpo was President of the West African Student's Union in the United Kingdom in the early 1940s. This organization was the rally point for students from West Africa who were studying in the Great Britain. WASU was lobbying members of the British Parliament to draw their attention to the political problems facing African Colonies and their leaders back home in different African Countries. The organization was the pivot for galvanization for support of some left thinking people to the plight of the colonial territories. WASU was the fulcrum of social and political activities of Students and people of West African Origin in the United Kingdom. Some of its activities include lobbying members of the British Parliament to draw their attention to the political problems facing African Colonies and their leaders.

== Political career ==
Arikpo was the first Minister for Lands and Survey in the Nigerian Government that was formed after the Macpherson Constitution came into force. Arikpo was one of the four Legislators elected into the Eastern Regional House of Assembly who were chosen to represent the Eastern Region in the Central House of Legislature in Lagos that was promulgated after the coming into force of the Macpherson Constitution. Arikpo was also a cabinet Minister in the 1957 Government formed by Sir Abubakar Tafawa Balewa.

Arikpo was an Activist. He was at the vanguard of the campaign to draw the attention of the Colonial Government to the plight of the minority people of the Eastern and Northern Region. He resigned from the NCNC in protest at the treatment meted out to the then Leader of Government Business in the Eastern Nigerian Government, late Professor Eyo Ita, who was pressured by the leadership of the NCNC to step down in order for Nnamdi Azikiwe to assume the position he was occupying after he had lost out in the power struggle in the Western Nigeria where members of this Party in the Western Region had succumbed to pressure mounted on them not to allow Azikiwe, an Igbo become leader of Government Business after his Party won the Western Regional election.

Thereafter Arikpo teamed with other minority rights activists to form the United Nigeria Independence Party which later allied with the Action Group as the opposition in the Eastern Region. He was in the forefront of the fight for autonomy of the ethnic minorities in the East for a creation of the Calabar/Ogoja/Rivers State. He was the Secretary-General of the COR State and Udo Udoma was the President.

Arikpo was among the people from the minority ethnic groups who drafted and articulated the position of the minority groups in the country before the Willink Commission was set up by the departing British colonizers to examine the fears of minorities of the Niger Delta. The Willink Commission called attention to the grave dangers in the Niger Delta.

Arikpo was the first Executive Secretary of the National Universities Commission.

== Minister of External Affairs ==
Arikpo was sent to the Western Capitals and the United States of America to make a case why Nigeria should not be allowed to be Balkanized during the heady days of the Civil War. This was after the Biafran Government had released reports on mass atrocities committed by the Nigerian government and had accused Nigeria of a deliberate policy of genocide being waged against the Igbo people, turning public opinion against Nigeria. Arikpo employed intellectualism to turn the tide against the Biafra.

In the Africa continent, Arikpo's effort to ensure that Biafra does not win more recognition after the dramatic recognition accorded it by France, Cote de Voire, Tanzania and Gabon was significant. A commentator noted thus

"Meanwhile, the OAU Council of Ministers meeting in Kinshasa began on September 4 and lasted till September 11, 1967. The Council meeting normally prepares the agenda for the Heads of State meeting. Arikpo, Gowon's External Affairs minister had a short but firm mandate for the preparatory meeting: 'Under no circumstances allow the Nigerian crisis to appear on the agenda for the OAU Summit.' To back up his mandate, Arikpo would cite Article II (2) of the OAU Charter, which states that member states should not interfere in the internal affairs of other members unless invited to do so. He also insisted that Nigeria was not keen to invite the mediation of a third party. Gowon also mandated Arikpo to stage a walk-out from the Summit should the matter, by any means, appear on the agenda or be mentioned during the Summit".

"The pivotal role that the Ministry of External Affairs was able to play in the foreign policy decision-making system was also due to the sort of leadership that the Commissioner for External Affairs was able to provide. Arikpo, who was the Commissioner, was a respected politician and an able administrator. His steady and competent leadership earned respect and support of the career diplomats who dominated the Ministry of External affairs. Arikpo's ability to work effectively with the career diplomats was also enhanced by his cautious and moderate foreign policy approach shared by the career diplomats. The effective and competent manner in which Arikpo and the Ministry of Foreign Affairs that he headed managed Nigeria's international relations during the Civil War period and the immediate Post- War period showed that Gowon's Government was correct in allowing the Ministry to have clear primacy in the foreign decision making system. During the Civil War, the Ministry was able to help Nigeria to develop new vital relationships with East European (Military weapons from the Soviet Union and other East European countries) were important in helping the Nigeria Military extinguish the secession of Biafra) while maintaining adequate relationships with the traditional friendly countries of the West".

== Selected publications ==
- Arikpo, Okoi (1967). The Development of Modern Nigeria. Penguin Books
- Arikpo, Okoi. 1958. Who Are the Nigerians? Lugard Lectures. Federal Ministry of Information

Political offices
Preceded by Yakubu Gowon	Foreign Minister of Nigeria; 1967 – 1975	Succeeded by Joseph Nanven Garba
