= Ishaya Audu =

Nigerian politician and doctor (1927–2005)

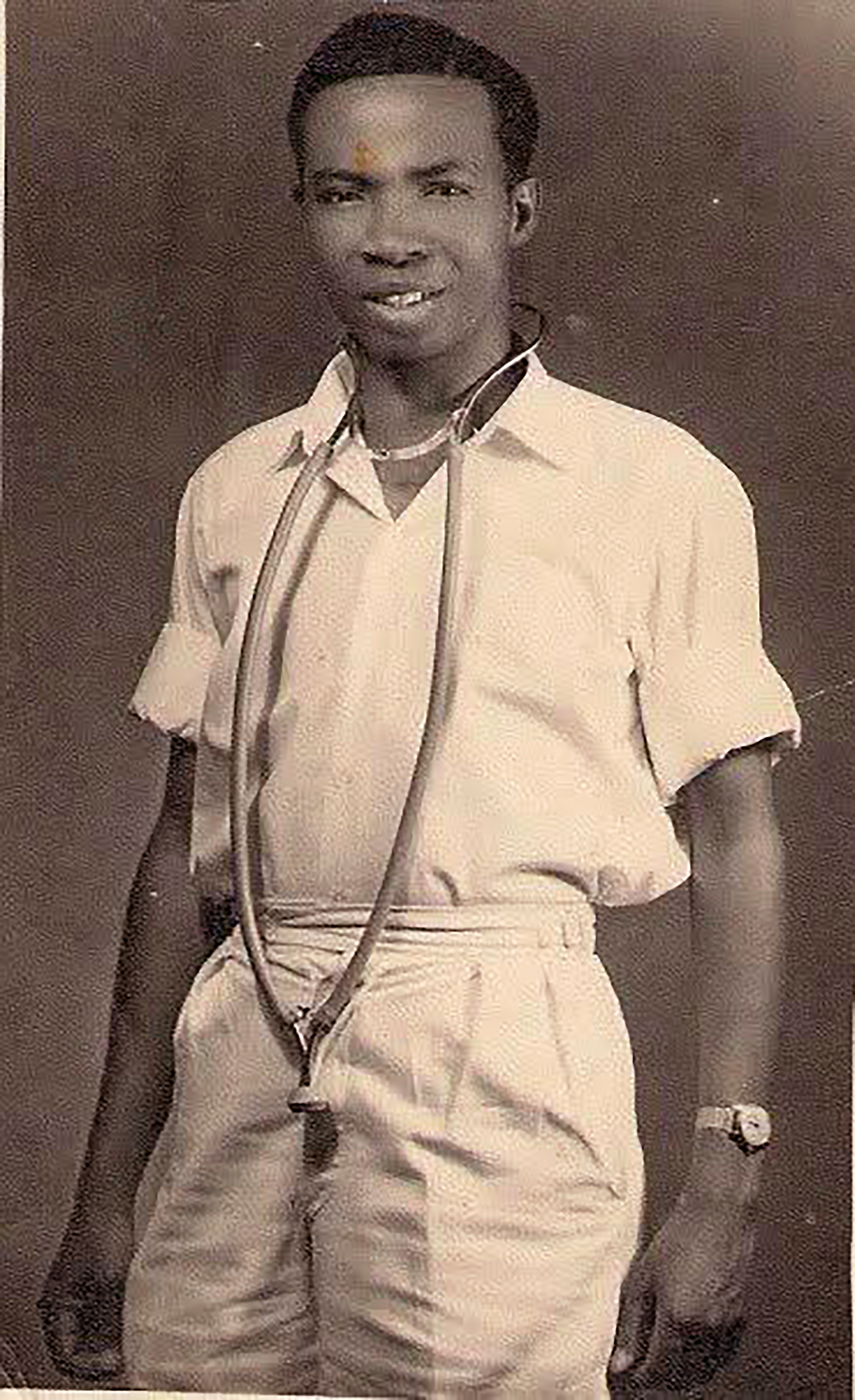
- Dr. Ishaya Audu at a younger age

Minister of External Affairs of Nigeria
- In office 1 October 1979 – 1 October 1983
- President: Shehu Shagari
- Preceded by: Henry Adefope
- Succeeded by: Emeka Anyaoku

Personal details
- Born: Ishaya Sha'aibu Audu; 1 March 1927 Anchau, British Nigeria
- Died: 29 August 2005 (aged 78) United States
- Party: National Party of Nigeria
- Spouse: Victoria Abosede Ohiorhenuan (m. 1958)
- Children: 6
- Parent: Bulus Audu (father)
- Education: University College, Ibadan; University of London; University of Liverpool
- Occupation: Politician; doctor; professor

Ishaya Sha'aibu Audu (1 March 1927 – 29 August 2005) was a Nigerian doctor, professor, and politician. A Hausa, Christian, he served as minister of external affairs (foreign minister) from 1979 to 1983 under Shehu Shagari.

== Early life, education, and career ==
Audu was born on 1 March 1927, in Anchau, a village near Zaria, Kaduna State, to Bulus Audu. Bulus was a farmer-trader who was one of the leading scholars of the Isawa, a radical Islamic sect, in the early 20th century. He was also one of the earliest Christian converts in Northern Nigeria.

Initially educated at St. Bartholomew's School in Wusasa, he moved to Yaba Higher College in Lagos and then to University College, Ibadan (renamed University of Ibadan) in 1948. In 1951, he left for the University of London in England, where he stayed until 1954. In 1955, he studied at the University of Liverpool (also in England). It was in 1958 that he married his wife, Victoria, with whom he would father six children.

Audu lectured in Internal Medicine at the University of Lagos in 1962 and was promoted to the position of Vice Chancellor of the Ahmadu Bello University in 1966. He had been the personal physician of Ahmadu Bello whom the university is named after. He also travelled to the United States where he was employed as an associate research professor at the University of Rochester, New York, and wrapped up his education at the Ohio University in Athens, Ohio, from 1964 until 1968. Ishaya Audu was the vice presidential candidate of the Nigerian People's Party which had Dr Nnamdi Azikiwe as its presidential candidate in the 1979 and 1983 presidential Elections.

== Political career ==
Audu was a member of the Nigeria Peoples Party when President Shehu Shagari gave Audu the position of Minister of External Affairs in 1979. He also served as Nigeria's Ambassador to the United Nations. After the 1983 overthrow of Shagari's government by General Muhammadu Buhari (and the replacement of the Second Republic with military dictatorship), Audu was detained for a year.

== Family ==
He was happily married to Victoria Abosede Ohiorhenuan from Ozalla, Owan West Edo State and they are blessed with six children.

== Later life ==
After his release Audu took up private practice at his own hospital in Samaru; he also founded his own church. He died on 29 August 2005, while in the United States with his son, Paul Audu.

Political offices
| Preceded by Henry Adefope | Minister of External Affairs; 1979– 1983 | Succeeded by Emeka Anyaoku |
