= Emeka Anyaoku =

Nigerian diplomat (born 1933)

The Right Honourable Chief Emeka Anyaoku GCON, GCVO, CFR
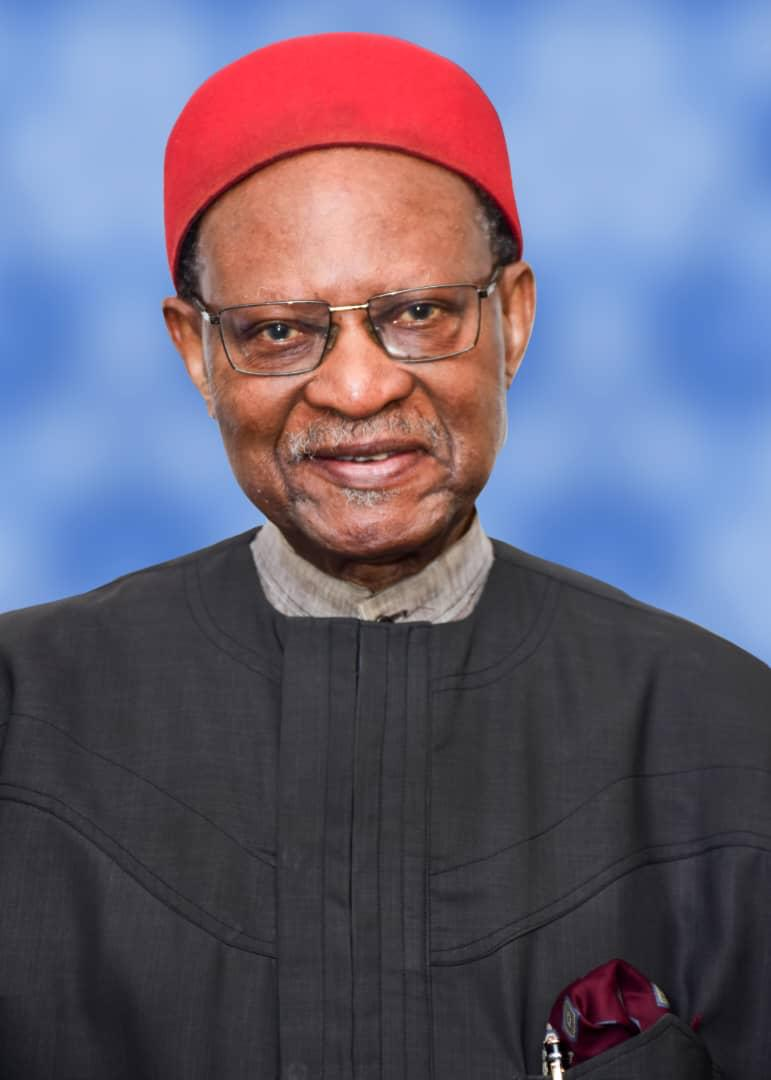

3rd Secretary-General of the Commonwealth of Nations
- In office 1 July 1990 – 31 March 2000
- Head: Elizabeth II
- Chairperson: Thabo Mbeki (South Africa)
- Preceded by: Sir Shridath Ramphal
- Succeeded by: Don McKinnon

Deputy Secretary-General for Political Affairs
- In office 1983 – 1 July 1990
- Head: Elizabeth II
- Secretary-General: Sir Shridath Ramphal
- Preceded by: M. A. Husain
- Succeeded by: Vacancy
- In office 1977–1983
- Preceded by: Vacancy
- Succeeded by: Anthony Siaguru

Personal details
- Born: 18 January 1933 (age 93) Obosi, Nigeria
- Spouse: Princess Bunmi Anyaoku (m. 1962)
- Children: 4

Chief Emeka Anyaoku, GCON, GCVO, CFR (born 18 January 1933) is a Nigerian diplomat. He was the third Commonwealth Secretary-General. Born in Obosi, Anyaoku was educated at Merchants of Light School, Oba, and attended the University College, Ibadan, then a college of the University of London, from which he obtained an honours degree in Classics as a College Scholar. Aside from his international career, Chief Anyaoku continues to fulfil the duties of his office as Ichie Adazie of Obosi, a traditional Ndichie chieftainship.

== Family background ==
Eleazar Chukwuemeka "Emeka" Anyaoku was born on 18 January 1933 to Emmanuel and Cecilia Anyaoku in Obosi, then a very large village in the eastern part of Nigeria. Emmanuel Chukwuemeka Anyaoku had been educated to middle-school level after his primary education at the CMS school in Onitsha under the guardianship of Reverend William Blackett, a Christian Missionary. After his education, he worked first with the railways and later in a hospital in Kaduna in the Northern part of Nigeria before becoming a catechist. After serving for a number of years, he went back to his village to farm. He became Ononukpo (Head) of Okpuno Ire, a quarter in Ire, the largest village in Obosi.

Cecilia, née Adiba Ogbogu, was married as second wife by Emmanuel when he returned from Kaduna following the death of his first wife. Cecilia hailed from a family in Ugamuma quarter of Obosi. She grew up at the home of Rev. Ekpunobi, her guardian, who was the first Obosi citizen to be ordained as an Anglican Priest. He was regarded as one of the most enlightened and educated in the community then. Cecilia stayed with the Ekpunobi family as a ward. Rev. Ekpunobi, on learning of the death of Emmanuel's wife, invited him to his home and subsequently convinced Emmanuel and Adiba to marry each other. Their first child, a girl, did not survive. Thereafter, Emeka was born along with five siblings.

== Education ==
At the age of seven, Emeka Anyaoku was sent to live with his father's only brother, Egwuenu Anyaoku, at Umuahia to begin his education at a rural school. At the time, the highest class at the school was standard four. The colonial administration then generally did not encourage pupils to go beyond standard four or standard six. At the age of 10, in 1943, Emeka was sent to stay with his father's cousin, Nathaniel Enwezor who was Headmaster at CMS Central School at Agbor, 75 km from Obosi.

For his secondary education, Anyaoku attended Merchants of Light School (MOLS) in Oba, joining the school's second intake of 60 boys. The boarding school was founded by his father's friend, Dr. Enoch Oli, a London- and Oxford-trained educationist who emphasized hard work and character. Anyaoku excelled academically, ultimately taking 10 subjects in his Cambridge School Certificate examination and earning a first-grade pass.

During holidays in Obosi, Anyaoku actively participated in debates organized by the Obosi Students Association. Contemporaries like Chief Godfrey Eneli noted his early leadership qualities and logical approach to arguments, earning him the nickname "lawyer" among his peers. Classmate S. I. Metu described him as highly studious and sociable, noting his natural diplomacy and interpersonal skills.

Early Career and University From 1952 to mid-1954, Anyaoku taught mathematics, Latin, and English at Emmanuel College in Owerri. Inspired by his Latin teacher at MOLS, he developed a deep interest in the classics and subsequently enrolled at the newly established University College of Ibadan, an overseas college of the University of London.

While an undergraduate in the mid-1950s, Anyaoku became actively involved in national politics. As a student union leader, he and his peers campaigned for a unitary state over a federal structure during Nigeria's pre-independence debates. The union sent delegations and petitions to the era's major political figures: Dr. Nnamdi Azikiwe in the East, Chief Obafemi Awolowo in the West, and Sir Ahmadu Bello in the North.

In 1959, Anyaoku graduated as a college scholar with a London University Honours Degree in Classics. He then joined the Commonwealth Development Corporation (CDC) in Lagos. After serving as an Executive Trainee at the CDC headquarters in London, he completing a course at the Royal Institute for Public Administration in London. He was posted back to the CDC's West Africa regional office in Lagos following Nigeria's independence in October 1960.

== Marriage ==
In December 1961, Anyaoku then a CDC Executive Officer came in contact with a 20-year-old Yoruba lady, Princess Ebunola Olubunmi Solanke, at a bachelor's eve party which he and his flatmate hosted for a friend of theirs in Lagos. The princess, familiarly known by the diminutive "Bunmi", was educated in England at a Christian girls boarding school, St. Mary's School at Hastings. She thereafter attended Pitman College, London. Emeka and Bunmi were married at the Anglican Cathedral Church in Lagos on 10 November 1962.

== Career ==
In 1959, Emeka Anyaoku joined the Commonwealth Development Corporation. In early 1962, Anyaoku came in contact with the then Prime Minister of Nigeria, Sir Abubakar Tafawa Balewa. He had accompanied his visiting boss, Lord Howick, Chairman of the Commonwealth Development Corporation, to a meeting with the Prime Minister on the activities of the corporation in Nigeria and the West African region. The Prime Minister, impressed by Anyaoku's answers to some of his questions on the projects supported by the CDC in West Africa, took an interest in Anyaoku's future and persuaded him to consider joining the Nigerian Foreign Service. After a gruelling interview by the Federal Civil Service Commission, he was offered an appointment in the Foreign Service in April 1962. Within a month of his entry, he was appointed Personal Assistant to the Permanent Secretary of the Ministry for External Affairs. There he was closely involved in the process that led to the establishment of the Organisation for African Unity (OAU) in May 1963. Following Nigeria's independence, he joined Nigeria's diplomatic service, and in 1963 was posted to its Permanent Mission to the United Nations in New York.

In 1966, he joined the Commonwealth Secretariat as Assistant Director of International Affairs. In 1968–69 there was a campaign by the Nigerian military government for the recall of Anyaoku; which said he was not a suitable Nigerian nominee, and they were anxious about his loyalty "to the country of his birth". But "Emeka had resigned from the Nigerian Foreign Service and Arnold had no difficulty in turning aside the demand".

In 1977, the Commonwealth Heads of Government elected him as Deputy Secretary-General. In 1983, Nigeria's civilian government appointed Anyaoku to become Nigeria's Foreign Minister. After the overthrow of the government by the military later that year, he returned to his position as Deputy Secretary-General with the support of the new government in Nigeria and the endorsement of all Commonwealth governments.

At the Commonwealth Heads of Government Meeting at Kuala Lumpur on 24 October 1989, Anyaoku was elected the third Commonwealth Secretary-General. He was re-elected at the 1993 CHOGM in Limassol for a second five-year term, beginning on 1 April 1995.

== United Nations ==
In July 1963, at the age of 30, he was posted to Nigeria's Permanent Mission to the United Nations in New York. His first child, Adiba, was born in the New York Lying-In Hospital on 20 November 1963, two days before President John F. Kennedy of the United States was assassinated. A few weeks previously, Nigeria had become a Republic, with Nnamdi Azikiwe as the first President. At his duty post at the United Nations, Anyaoku as Nigeria's alternative representative in the United Nations special committee on Apartheid drafted the resolution – presented to the General Assembly by Nigeria in 1965 – that established a trust fund to enable governments to contribute to the defense of political detainees in South Africa.

He became embroiled in the crisis triggered by the Ian Smith administration in the then Southern Rhodesia in Southern Africa, who announced Rhodesia's Unilateral Declaration of Independence (UDI) from Britain. Anyaoku spoke at various forums to condemn this development. It was during one of these occasions that the news of Nigeria's first military coup d'état of 15 January 1966 reached him. The Prime Minister, Sir Abubakar Tafawa Balewa, the powerful Premier of the Northern Region, Sir Ahmadu Bello, and a number of other leaders of the post-independence state were assassinated during the coup d'état. The coup d'état had taken place just one day after the Prime Minister hosted other Commonwealth leaders including the new Secretary-General, Arnold Smith, to a meeting in Lagos where they discussed the issue of Rhodesia.

== Commonwealth years ==
In July 1965 the decision by Commonwealth Heads of Government to set up a Commonwealth Secretariat was implemented with the appointment of a very distinguished Canadian diplomat, Arnold Smith as the first Commonwealth Secretary-General. The Secretary-General was in the process of assembling a multi-national, multi-cultural team at the core of the new Secretariat.

On his visit to Nigeria in November 1965, Smith had met and told the Prime Minister, Sir Tafawa Balewa in the presence of the then Nigerian's Foreign Minister and the Permanent Secretary, that he was looking for a young Nigerian foreign service officer who would "help him to make nonsense of racist myths." After Smith left, the Prime Minister asked the Foreign Ministry to give him three names that would satisfy the Secretary-General's request. Anyaoku was among the three names suggested and was selected by the Prime Minister for secondment to the new Commonwealth Secretariat. On arrival at the Secretariat in London in April 1966, Anyaoku was particularly impressed with the way the Secretary-General, Arnold Smith was handling the Rhodesia UDI issue. He was made Assistant Director of International Affairs which later became the Political Affairs Division. His first major assignment was to serve as Secretary of a Review Committee set up by the Secretary-General with the approval of Heads of Government to review all existing Commonwealth inter-governmental institutions with a view to determining which should be integrated into the newly established Commonwealth Secretariat.

In July 1967, the Nigerian Civil War broke out. During that period, he and his wife hosted many separate luncheons and dinners in their London home for the Nigerian and Biafran representatives at the peace talks sponsored by the Secretary-General, Arnold Smith. In the middle of the talks, he told the Secretary-General that he was willing to travel home to speak with the Biafran leader, Emeka Ojukwu about the Secretary-General's peace proposals to the two warring parties. He and Ojukwu had been friends since their boyhood. Smith considered it a very risky venture but allowed Anyaoku to go. When he was embarking on the journey, his third child, Obi, who was just about three months old, was very ill in the hospital. The doctors were worried that he might not survive the ailment. When he told his wife, Bunmi, that he had to travel, she was shocked by his seeming insensitivity to their son's condition. Anyaoku told her, "there are many more in worse state, dying every day, in Biafra." She was speechless.

Anyaoku left on a Red Cross flight to Nigeria via Amsterdam and Sao Tome. The day after his arrival at the Biafran enclave, he had a scary experience of a bomb raid during which he had to dive with his two interlocutors in the Biafran Foreign Ministry under the table. He eventually had a dramatic encounter with Ojukwu in his bunker at his headquarters. And when he left Biafra, after also seeing a number of his relations, he had a hair-raising exit on a flight that was evacuating children. It was an aircraft with no seats, which took off from Uli to Gabon.

Anyaoku continued to be involved in various Commonwealth initiatives and negotiations, such as the Gibraltar referendum of 1967, the St Kitts-Nevis-Anguilla constitutional crisis of 1969 to 1970, the problems following Commonwealth Games' boycotts during the 1980s and the process leading to peace and democracy in Zimbabwe, Namibia and in particular, South Africa.

He also moved up the ladder within the Commonwealth Secretariat. He became the Director of the International Affairs Division in 1971 and in 1975 rose to the position of Assistant Secretary-General. In 1977, Commonwealth Governments elected him deputy secretary-general with responsibility for international affairs and the secretariat's administration.

In October 1983, he resigned from his post and returned to Nigeria at the invitation of the Civilian President Shehu Shagari to serve as the country's foreign minister. On the overthrow of the government by the military on 31 December 1983, he went back with the unanimous support of the Commonwealth Governments to his previous position as Deputy Secretary-General. In 1989, at their meeting in Kuala-lumpur he was elected by Commonwealth Heads of Government the third Commonwealth Secretary-General. He was re-elected at the 1993 Limassol Commonwealth Heads of Government Meeting for a second five-year term.

Apart from striving to strengthen intra-Commonwealth relations and promoting democracy and good governance, one of the major projects he tackled during his tenure was the establishment of democracy in South Africa. He tirelessly championed and spoke in favour of the struggle to rid South Africa of Apartheid. In 1990, on the release of former President Nelson Mandela from Pollsmoor Prison, Anyaoku hosted Madiba to his first official dinner as Commonwealth Secretary-General in London. Between 1 November 1991 and 17 November 1993, he visited South Africa 11 times, using his diplomatic skills to help in breaking deadlocks in the negotiation process that brought the end of apartheid in South Africa.

In 1998, in recognition of Anyaoku's contribution to the transition in South Africa, and the manner in which he had championed the cause of the progressive movements in Southern Africa, the President of South Africa accorded him the rare honour of addressing a joint sitting of the South African Parliament. President Nelson Mandela wrote the foreword of Anyaoku's biography, Eye of Fire, authored by Phyllis Johnson, as well as to Anyaoku's memoirs, The Inside Story of the Modern Commonwealth.

Anyaoku was involved in numerous interventions to broker peace between several Commonwealth leaders and opposition parties in their countries. He also initiated the use of Commonwealth observer groups to assist elections in various countries. Apart from exerting beneficial influence on the electoral process, the presence of Commonwealth observers made it easier for the parties who had lost to accept the result, if the election was judged by Commonwealth observers to be free and fair. In his ten years as Secretary-General, he sent 51 election observer groups to various Commonwealth countries.

Beginning with President Kaunda in 1991, he intervened to help Zambia and several other Commonwealth nations to transit from one-party state or military regime to multi-party democracies. For example, he in the same year, persuaded President Arap Moi of Kenya to have a constitutional expert come and help the country revise its constitution to adapt it to the requirements of a multi-party democracy and thereafter in early 1992, persuaded the three opposition parties leaders who had rejected the result of the presidential elections to accept it thereby saving the country from a serious political crisis.

These interventions were not limited to Africa. His intervention in Bangladesh was another example that demanded a lot of time and patience. The country's two political leaders were Begum Zia and Sheikh Hasina. Begum Zia had become the prime minister following the assassination of her husband who was the Prime Minister. The leader of the opposition party, Sheikh Hasina, was the daughter of Sheik Abdul Rahman, the first Prime Minister of independent Bangladesh who with his entire family with the exception of daughter Hasina had been killed in a military coup d'état. Hasina was lucky to be out of the country on that fateful night. Anyaoku persuaded the two leaders to agree to his proposal to send an experienced representative to come to Bangladeshi to hold discussions with the Prime Minister, Begum Zia and the leader of the opposition Sheik Hasina with a view to finding a formula for mutual accommodation between their two parties. Anyaoku consequently sent as his special representative, Sir Ninian Steven, a former Australian Governor-General, who spent weeks in Dhaka brokering peace between the government and the opposition parties.

He also intervened in Pakistan during a potentially destabilizing disagreement between the then President, Mr. Farooq Leghari and the Prime Minister, Nawaz Sharif.

The most challenging of his interventions was the crisis in his country Nigeria that followed the annulment of the 12 June 1993 presidential election by the then military junta of General Ibrahim Babangida. The election had apparently been won by Chief Moshood Abiola. On the day after the annulment, Anyaoku issued a strident statement, saying that the annulment was a "severe setback to the cause of democracy, particularly at a time when all Commonwealth governments have pledged themselves to promote democratic rule in their countries"; he called it "a bitter disappointment" to all those who had been looking forward to the assumption of office of a democratically elected government in Nigeria.

Anyaoku had a much tougher case when Babangida "stepped aside" and General Sani Abacha after a few months of the contraption called Interim Government took over the administration of the country in a military coup d'état on 17 November 1993. Abacha instituted much more draconian measures. He arrested and jailed the presumed winner of the 12 June 1993 election, Abiola. And the country was thrown into a great turmoil with labour strikes and public demonstrations raging all over.

Abacha exacerbated the crisis further by arresting, detaining and putting on trial Ken Saro-Wiwa and other Ogoni activists on a charge of complicity in the murder of four Ogoni Chiefs who had opposed their campaign methodology. Later in March 1995, the Abacha regime alleged that a coup attempt had been hatched against it. Many observers dismissed this as a phantom coup. The regime, however, embarked on the arrest and detention of many serving and former officers, including erstwhile military Head of State, General Olusegun Obasanjo, and his previous deputy, General Shehu Musa Yar’Adua.

The alleged coup plotters were tried by a military tribunal and were sentenced variously, with Obasanjo being given life imprisonment, while Yar’Adua was sentenced to death. Anyaoku continued to campaign for a peaceful resolution of the crisis by sending messages to Abacha and making public statements, to no avail. The matter came to a boiling point when Ken Saro-Wiwa and eight of his fellow accused were also sentenced to death. Anyaoku made a passionate appeal to Abacha soliciting for clemency for the condemned activists. This appeal fell on Abacha's deaf ears and he eventually had Ken Saro-Wiwa and his colleagues executed on the eve of a meeting of the Commonwealth Heads of Government in Auckland, New Zealand, in November 1995. In reaction, Commonwealth leaders decided to suspend Nigeria from its membership of the association.

In the meantime, Anyaoku had sought to engage Abacha in discussions aimed at resolving the political crisis in Nigeria. Anyaoku had with Abacha's agreement met in July 1995 with Abiola in detention to discuss his proposal for a dialogue between the two parties with the aim of agreeing arrangements for the acceptance of the outcome of the annulled presidential elections. While Abiola on his part accepted the proposal, Abacha turned it down telling Anyaoku that he would prefer to seek a resolution of the crisis through a constitutional conference to be convened by him.

Following Abacha's sudden death on 8 June 1998, a new military regime under General Abdulsalami Abubakar came in to facilitate a quick return of the country to democratic dispensation. Anyaoku with his Commonwealth team gave full support to this process, including especially the national elections that produced the civilian administration of President Olusegun Obasanjo.

In pursuance of his declared priority from the beginning of his tenure to make the Commonwealth a potent force for the promotion of democracy and good governance, Anyaoku in early 1997, organized the first African Commonwealth Heads of Government Roundtable to discuss democracy and good governance on the continent. He retired from his position as Commonwealth Secretary-General on 31 March 2000.

On his retirement, the University of London established a professional chair at its Institute of Commonwealth studies named after him, the Emeka Anyaoku Professor of Commonwealth Studies. He was also invited to be a Distinguished Visiting Fellow at the Centre for the Study of Global Governance, London School of Economics (2000–2002). He was awarded the Freedom of the City of London in 1998 and has received decorations from Nigeria CFR and CON, and the highest national civilian honours of Cameroon, Lesotho, Madagascar, Namibia and Trinidad & Tobago's Trinity Cross (TC) as well as Honorary Knight Grand Cross of the Royal Victorian Order (GCVO) from her Majesty, The Queen in 2000. He was one of the fifty, and also one of the one hundred individuals who were awarded special gold medals for outstanding contribution to the country's development by the Federal Government in the celebrations of Nigeria's independence Golden Jubilee in 2010 and Centenary in 2014.

Emeka Anyaoku is a published author and now holds 33 honorary Doctorate degrees from top universities in Britain, Canada, Ghana, Republic of Ireland, Nigeria, South Africa, Switzerland and Zimbabwe.

Anyaoku served under three democratically elected Presidents in Nigeria as Chairman of the Presidential Advisory Council on International Relations from 2000 to 2015. He along with Kofi Annan played a seminal role in getting all the presidential candidates and their political parties to commit themselves to a violence-free electoral process by signing in January the Abuja Accord that ensured a relatively peaceful election and transition to a new democratic dispensation in Nigeria of President Muhammadu Buhari in May 2015.

The positions in which Chief Emeka Anyaoku has served/is still serving include the following:

- 1975: Leader, Commonwealth Mission to Mozambique
- 1979–90: Member of the Council of Overseas Development Institute in London.
- 1984–90: Member of Governing Council of the Save the Children Fund
- 1992– : Hon. Member of the Club of Rome
- 1994-96: Member, World Commission on Forests
- 2000–06: President, Royal Commonwealth Society
- 2000–present: President, Royal African Society
- 2001–present: Member, United Nations Eminent Persons Group to help advance the aims of the World Conference Against Racism
- 2002–09: President, World Wide Fund for Nature, WWF
- 2004–05: Chairman, United Nations Secretary-General's Panel on International support to African Development (NEPAD)
- 2002–10: Member of the Governing Board of the South Centre in Geneva
- 2005–13: Trustee of the British Museum
- 2000–15: Chairman, Presidential Advisory Council on International Relations in Nigeria.
- 2013–present: President, Metropolitan Club, Lagos.

== Personal life ==
Installed in 1980 as the Ichie Adazie of Obosi, Anyaoku has continued to fulfil the duties of the office of a traditional Ndichie chieftainship in Obosi. The Ichie Anyaoku has been married to Princess Bunmi Anyaoku since 1962. Princess Anyaoku is an Omoba of Abeokuta, Nigeria. Of their marriage, it was written in the Nigerian Sunday Times, then the widest circulating newspaper in the country, that

it was a wedding of one of Nigeria's most eligible bachelors and a beautiful young Princess educated in an English boarding school and Pitman College, London.

They have four children, Adiba; their daughter– an attorney who serves on the board of Old Mutual plc –and three sons; Oluyemisi, Obiechina, and Emenike. Emeka has two grandchildren, born to Adiba and her husband; Irenne Ighodaro and Osita Ighodaro. In 1990, the heads of all the 19 communities of the Idemili Clan in his home State of Anambra accorded Anyaoku a unique honour by investing him with the title of Ugwumba Idemili. His wife, Bunmi, is also a chieftain – Ugoma Obosi and Idemili – in her own right, with a long involvement in welfare work in Nigeria and in the Commonwealth.

As part of his 91st birthday celebration on 18 January 2024, Anyaoku unveiled the Emeka and Bunmi Anyaoku Centre in Obosi, his home town. The centre houses a library and museum he had built in the town as his contribution to education, practice of democracy and human rights. The collections in the museum include cultural artifacts from all over Nigeria, other Commonwealth countries and Africa while the library also has his personal papers from his days as Secretary General of the Commonwealth of Nations as well as books and other knowledge resources.

Emeka Anyaoku is an Anglican, his father having converted to that faith. He writes that he is

very comfortable being an Anglican, comfortable with the beliefs that Anglicanism represents.

He is also a vice-president of the Royal Commonwealth Society.

Political offices
Preceded by Shridath Ramphal	Secretary-General for the Commonwealth; 1990–1999	Succeeded by Don McKinnon
Preceded by Ishaya Audu	Foreign Minister of Nigeria; 1983 – 1983	Succeeded by Ibrahim Gambari
Non-profit organization positions
Preceded by Sara Morrison	President of the World Wide Fund for Nature; 2001–2010	Succeeded by Yolanda Kakabadse
