= Walter R. Miller =

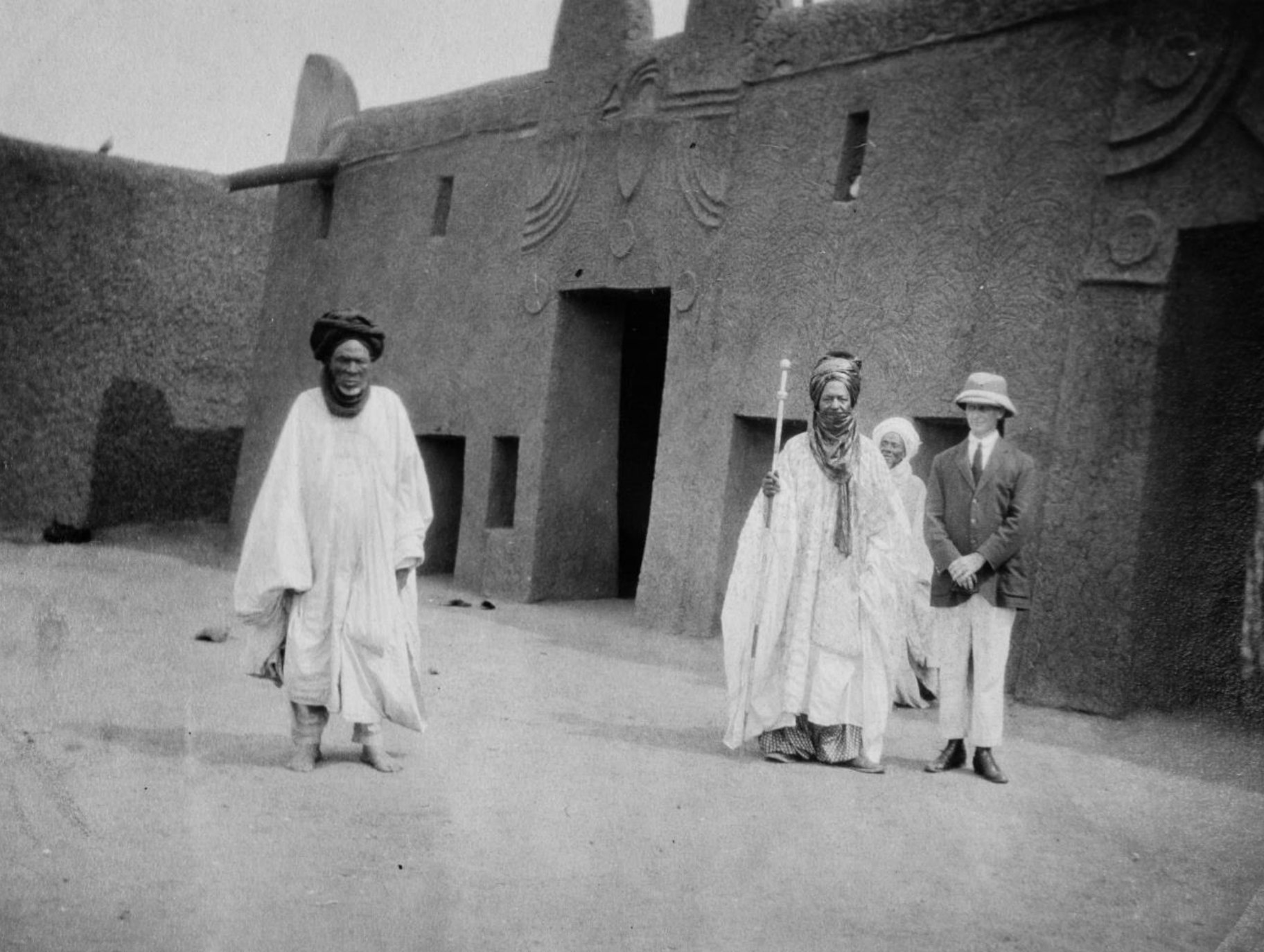
Walter Miller (r) with Emir of Zaria Aliyu (reigned: 1903–1920)

Walter Richard Samuel Miller (22 March 1872 - 17 August 1952) was a British missionary active in Nigeria during the first half of the 20th century. He was the main author of the first complete translation of the Bible into Hausa.

== Biography ==
Walter Richard Samuel Miller was born in 1872 in Devonshire, United Kingdom.

He studied at St Bartholomew's Hospital medical school and graduated MRCS and LRCP in 1896.

His Christianity was influenced by the Plymouth Brethren and the Society of Friends. He set his sights on a life as a missionary from an early age, studying Arabic and Hausa in Cairo and then Tripoli with a view to evangelising northern Nigeria. A member of the Church Missionary Society (CMS), he arrived in Lagos at Christmas 1899 and travelled to Kano, but the emir of that city would not allow Christian missionaries to settle there. He finally settled in Zaria in 1902 with another missionary, George Bargery. His sister Ethel Miller joined him some time later. He opened a dispensary and a school.

In 1929, the new emir asked the Christian mission to leave Zaria for Wusasa. Miller gradually translated the Bible into Hausa, which was published in full in that language for the first time in 1932. He left the CMS afterward and returned to England in 1935; however, he returned to Nigeria four years later. He settled permanently in Bukuru, a tin-mining city south of Jos in Plateau Province (now Plateau State). There, he devoted himself to teaching Hausa and writing until his death on 27 August 1952 at the age of 80. He was buried at St Piran's Cemetery in Jos.

Miller was fondly remembered in Northern Nigeria, even among Muslim elites. One of them, the Hausa writer Abubakar Imam, wrote a tribute titled Likita Mila ("Dr. Miller").

== Family ==
Miller had a sister named Ethel, who was also an outspoken Christian missionary in colonial Northern Nigeria.

Miller married in 1935; his wife died in 1939.

== Works ==
- W. R. S. Miller, Hausa Notes, London: Henry Frowde, 1901, 127 pp. --2nd. ed., Lagos (Nigeria): The C.M.S. Bookshop, 1922, 167 pp.
- W. R. S. Miller, Reflections of a Pioneer, London: C.M.S., 1936.
- W. R. S. Miller, Yesterday and tomorrow in northern Nigeria, 1938.
- W. R. S. Miller, Have We Failed in Nigeria?, London, 1947.
- W. R. S. Miller, Success in Nigeria? Assets and Possibilities, London: United Society for Christian Literature / Redhill: Lutterworth Press, 1948.
- W. R. S. Miller, For Africans only, 1950.
- W. R. S. Miller, Walter Miller: An Autobiography 1872-1952, London: C.M.S., 1952.
