= Godwin Obasi =

Nigerian meteorologist (1933–2007)

Obasi Godwin FAAS FTWAS
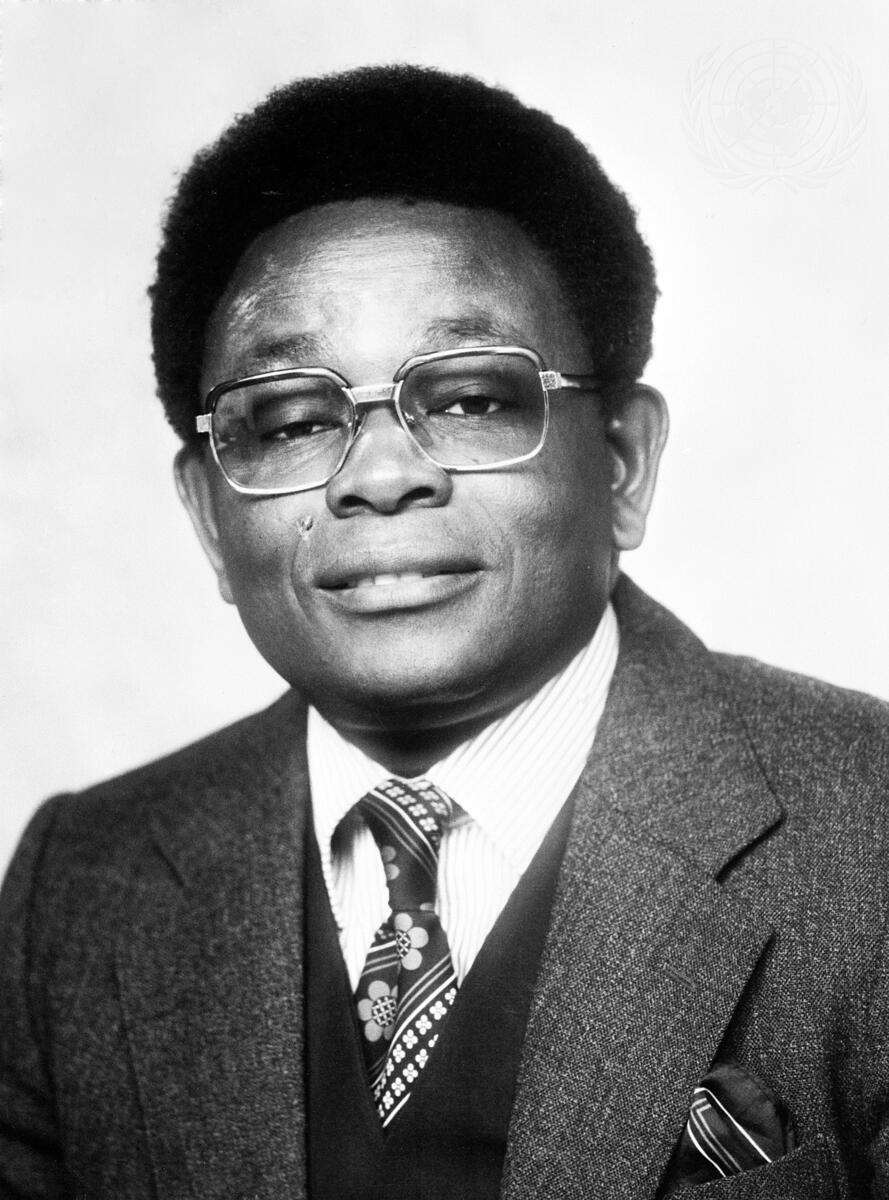
- Official portrait, 1984

4th Secretary-General of the World Meteorological Organization
- In office 1 January 1984 – 31 December 2003
- Preceded by: Aksel C. Wiin-Nielsen
- Succeeded by: Michel Jarraud

Personal details
- Born: Godwin Olu Patrick Obasi; 24 December 1933 Ogori, Nigeria
- Died: 3 March 2007 (aged 73) Abuja, Nigeria
- Education: McGill University (BSc); MIT (MSc, DSc)
- Awards
- Scientific career
- Institutions: World Meteorological Organization; University of Nairobi; UNDP
- Thesis: Atmospheric momentum and energy calculations for the Southern hemisphere during the IGY (1963)
- Doctoral advisor: Victor Paul Starr

Godwin Olu Patrick Obasi // (24 December 1933 – 3 March 2007) was a Nigerian meteorologist and the secretary-general of the World Meteorological Organization (WMO) from 1984 to 2003. He was the first African to serve as the head of a UN agency.

Obasi studied at McGill University and MIT, before returning to Nigeria, and hold key roles in the Nigerian Meteorological Department. He also served as a professor and dean at the University of Nairobi, where he advanced meteorological education. Obasi joined the WMO in 1978 and was pivotal in promoting global climate agreements. He was honoured with numerous awards, including Nigeria Centenary Award. He is remembered as "Africa's gift to the world of climate science".

== Life and career ==
=== Early life and education ===
Godwin Olu Patrick Obasi was born on 24 December 1933, to Albert B. Patrick Obasi and Rhoda A. Akande, in Ogori, Kwara, Nigeria. He attended St. Peter School in Ogori, and St. Andrew School in Okene, Kogi State, for his early education. He then attended middle school in Okene, at today's Abdul Aziz Atta Memorial College. He afterwards transferred to the Barewa College in Zaria, where he was a classmate of Yakubu Gowon, a former head of state of Nigeria.

He obtained a Bachelor of Science in Mathematics and Physics with honours from McGill University, in 1959, and a Master of Science in Meteorology with distinction from the Massachusetts Institute of Technology (MIT) in 1960. He went on to obtain a Doctor of Science in Meteorology from MIT in 1963. He received the Carl-Gustaf Rossby Award for his thesis.

=== Career ===
Obasi returned to Nigeria to become a senior meteorologist in charge of research and training at the Nigerian Meteorological Department from 1963 to 1967, and he was also a senior meteorologist in charge of technical administration at the department's headquarters in Lagos from 1966 to 1967. Additionally, he served as the senior meteorologist in charge of meteorological services at Lagos Airport from 1964 to 1965, and as chairman of the working group on tropical meteorology for the World Meteorological Organization from 1965 to 1967.

From 1967 to 1974, Obasi was a World Meteorological Organization/United Nations Development Programme expert and a senior lecturer at the University of Nairobi in Kenya. At the university, he served as acting head of the Department of Meteorology from 1972 to 1973, as professor and chairman of the department from 1974 to 1976, and as dean of the Faculty of Science from 1967 to 1976. Obasi also worked as an adviser in meteorology and assistant director for the Nigerian government from 1976 to 1978.

In 1973, he served as a visiting research fellow at Florida State University. In 1978, he was appointed as a vice president and a member of the advisory group of the Commission for Atmospheric Science at the WMO. Additionally, he served on the board of advisors for The Bower Award and Prize for Achievement in Science at the Franklin Institute. He was the vice president of the Third World Academy of Sciences (now The World Academy of Sciences).

Obasi joined the WMO Secretariat in 1978 as the director of education and training. He also organised the convening of the Second World Climate Conference in Geneva in 1990, following which the United Nations General Assembly created the Framework Convention on Climate Change. He also contributed to the UN Convention to Combat Desertification's formation.

Obasi served as the secretary-general of the WMO from 1984 to 2003. He was the first secretariat employee to be named secretary-general and the first African to serve as the head of a UN agency.

According to a New York Times article by Judith Miller on 9 February 2005, there were allegations of theft and mismanagement at the WMO. It reported that the agency was accused of using money intended for hurricane relief to pay for office furnishings and travel expenses. Other sources indicated that Muhammad Hassan, WMO's head of training and Obasi's closest ally, was accused of the embezzlement of CHF 4.3 million. An internal WMO audit, quoted by Neue Zürcher Zeitung, revealed that Muhammad Hassan informed Obasi of some of his wrongdoings. The Le Temps reported that the embezzled money would have been partly used to exert "political influence on the representatives of certain countries". Additionally, the New York Times article noted allegations of fraud and nepotism within the agency, as well as complaints about the organisation's overall management.

=== Personal life, death, and legacy ===
Obasi married Winifred O. Akande on 1 October 1976, and they had six children. He died on 3 March 2007, in Abuja, Nigeria.

Obasi has been recognised for his significant contributions to climate science and is seen as "Africa's gift to the world of climate science". He was the subject of a memorial lecture at the Seventh Conference on Climate Change and Development in Africa in Nairobi, Kenya, in 2018, and another memorial lecture was held in his name in September 2021 at the Ninth Conference on Climate Change and Development in Africa in Cabo Verde.

== Awards and honours ==
Obasi received several honours during his lifetime, including being elected as a fellow of the African Academy of Sciences in 1995, and a fellow of The World Academy of Sciences in 1996. He was elected and an Academician of the International Academy of Sciences of Nature and Society (Armenia) and the International Council for Science (ICSU).

Obasi was awarded several honorary doctorate degrees, including a Doctor of Physics from the University Bucharest in 1991, Romania, and a Doctor of Laws from the University of the Philippines in 1992, a Doctor of Science from the Federal University of Technology Akure in 1992, Doctor of Science from the Alpine Geophysical Research Institute in 1993, and a Doctor of Science from the University of Nairobi in 1998. He was also awarded the TWAS Medal Lecture in Earth Sciences in 2002, and Zayed International Prize for the Environment for Scientific and Technological Achievement in 2003.

Obasi was honoured with the Nigerian Order of the Federal Republic in 1983 and 2001, the Paraguayan Gold Medal in 1988, the Freedom of Ho Chi Minh City in 1990. He was made a Commander of the National Order of the Ivory Coast in 1992, the Order of the Niger in 1994, the National Order of the Lion in 1995, the National Order of Benin in 1997, the National Order of Burkina Faso [fr] in 1997, Order of the Lithuanian Grand Duke Gediminas in 1998, the Presidential Medal of Friendship from Vietnam in 1998, the Nigerian National Medal of Honour for Environmental Achievement in 1999, the Plaque of Appreciation from Iran in 1999, and the Order of Grand Warrior of Kenya in 1999 and 2000.

In 2014, Obasi posthumously received a Nigeria Centenary Award.
