= Joseph Nanven Garba =

Nigerian general, diplomat and politician (1943–2002)

Major General Joseph Nanven Garba CFR
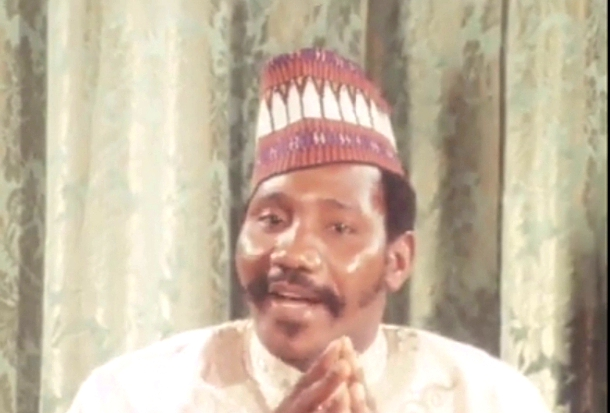
- Garba, c. 1976

President of the United Nations General Assembly
- In office 1989–1990
- Preceded by: Dante Caputo
- Succeeded by: Guido de Marco

Permanent Representative of Nigeria to the United Nations
- In office 1984–1990
- President: Ibrahim Babangida
- Preceded by: Yusuf Maitama Sule
- Succeeded by: Ibrahim Gambari

Commandant of the Nigerian Defence Academy
- In office July 1978 – July 1979
- Preceded by: Brig. E.S. Armah
- Succeeded by: Brig. Zamani Lekwot

Federal Commissioner for External Affairs
- In office 1975–1978
- Head of State: Murtala Mohammed; Olusegun Obasanjo
- Preceded by: Arikpo Okoi
- Succeeded by: Henry Adefope

Commander of the Brigade of Guards
- In office 1968–1975
- Preceded by: Brig. W.D. Bassey
- Succeeded by: Brig. M.J. Vatsa

Personal details
- Born: Joseph Nanven Garba; 17 July 1943 Langtang, Northern Region, British Nigeria (now in Plateau State, Nigeria)
- Died: 1 June 2002 (aged 58) Abuja, Nigeria
- Education: Nigerian Military School; Mons Officer Cadet School; Staff College, Camberley; National Defence College (India); Harvard Kennedy School
- Occupation: Military officer; diplomat; politician

Military service
- Allegiance: Nigeria
- Branch/service: Nigerian Army
- Years of service: 1961–1980
- Rank: Major general

Joseph Nanven Garba CFR (17 July 1943 – 1 June 2002) was a Nigerian general, diplomat, and politician who served as president of the United Nations General Assembly from 1989 to 1990. He served as federal commissioner for external affairs from 1975 to 1978, commandant of the Nigerian Defence Academy from 1978 to 1979 and commander of the Brigade of Guards from 1968 to 1975.

== Early life and military career ==
Born in Langtang, Nigeria, Garba was educated at Sacred Heart School, Shendam from 1952 to 1957. His early military career began at the Nigerian Military School in Zaria in 1957, where he studied until 1961. In 1961 he enlisted in the Nigerian Army and was sent to the Mons Officer Cadet School in Aldershot, England, before being commissioned as an infantry officer in 1962. Garba rose through the ranks quickly: amongst his many military command posts were platoon commander of 44th Battalion in 1963, company commander from 1963 to 64, and mortar platoon commander in 1964. He participated in the United Nations Military Observer Mission in India/Pakistan (UNIPOM) from 1965 to 1966 before being made commander of the Brigade of Guards in 1968. He studied at Staff College, Camberley, England, in 1973.

== Participation in the Nigerian Counter Coup of July 1966 ==
Garba, then a Captain with the Federal Guards in Lagos, was one of the many officers of northern Nigerian origin (including Lieutenant Colonel Murtala Muhammed, Major Theophilus Danjuma, Lieutenant Muhammadu Buhari, Lieutenant Ibrahim Babangida, Lieutenant Ibrahim Bako, 2nd Lieutenant Sani Abacha among others), who staged what became known as the Nigerian counter-coup of 1966 because of grievances they felt towards the administration of General Aguiyi Ironsi's government which quelled the 15 January 1966 coup.

== Participation in the 1975 Military Coup ==
Garba first came to national attention in Nigeria when, on 29 July 1975, he announced the coup d'état against the leader of the country, General Yakubu Gowon. Garba's speech, broadcast from Radio Nigeria, began with the following statement:

Fellow countrymen and women, I, Colonel Joseph Nanven Garba, in consultation with my colleagues, do hereby declare that in view of what has been happening in our country in the past few months, the Nigerian Armed Forces decided to effect a change of the leadership of the Federal Military Government. As from now, General Yakubu Gowon ceases to be head of the Federal Military Government and Commander-in-Chief of the Armed Forces of Nigeria. The general public is advised to be calm and to go about their lawful duties.

Garba was a close ally of Gowon. The coup was led by junior military officers unhappy at the lack of progress General Gowon had made in moving the country towards democratic rule, and Garba's role as an insider is credited with ensuring that the coup was bloodless. Garba and Gowon later reconciled to the extent that Gowon attended Garba's funeral in Langtang in 2002.

== Diplomatic career ==
Following the coup, Garba made a shift from the military to politics and diplomacy. In 1975 he was appointed Nigeria's foreign minister (Federal Commissioner for External Affairs) by Murtala Mohammed, and continued in this role under Olusẹgun Ọbasanjọ after the former was assassinated in 1976. Garba was the head of the Nigerian delegation to the United Nations General Assembly from 1975, culminating in his appointment as President of the United Nations Security Council in January 1978.

In 1978, as Ọbasanjọ was preparing to hand rule of Nigeria over to civilians, Garba was reassigned to the role of Commandant of the Nigerian Defence Academy. He held this position until 1980, when he left to study at the National Defence College in New Delhi, India. Following this, Garba studied as a fellow at Harvard Kennedy School at Harvard University, where he obtained a Master's degree in Public Administration.

Returning to diplomatic life, Garba was appointed a Permanent Representative to the United Nations in 1984, a role he continued in until 1989. In 1989, he was elected President of the United Nations General Assembly for its forty-fourth session. During his tenure, the Convention on the Rights of the Child was adopted into international law. In the post of president, Garba was also an outspoken opponent of apartheid in South Africa. Garba remained president for the sixteenth, seventeenth, and eighteenth special sessions of the assembly, on Apartheid, drug abuse, and international economic co-operation respectively.

== Later life ==
In 1979, Garba was awarded the title of Commander of the Order of the Federal Republic, and made a Grand Officer of the Ordre National Du Bénin ("National Order of Benin"). He wrote a number of books, including Revolution in Nigeria: Another View (1982), Diplomatic Soldiering (1987), and Fractured History: Elite Shifts and Policy Changes in Nigeria (1995), and was awarded an honorary doctoral degree from the State University of New York in 1991.

Garba spent four years (1992-1995) in New York directing the Southern African Peacekeeping and Peacemaking Project, which focused on the security challenges facing a changing southern African region. A key focus of the project was the restructuring of the security forces for a new and post-apartheid South Africa. The findings and results of the project were published in two volumes in 1993 and 1994. On 26–28 January 1994, in Harare, Zimbabwe, he brought together for the first time military commanders from South Africa and their counterparts from the ANC and the southern Africa region, as well as international security experts for a conference on restructuring South Africa’s security forces. His input, role and engagement with some senior South African military and police commanders in South Africa, including Lt. General Pierre Steyn, General J.J. Geldenhuys, Major-General Bantu Holomisa and Lt. General Sebastian J. Smit, Major-General George Fivas, and commanders from the neighboring countries would prove instrumental to the smooth transition of the South African military in the post-apartheid era. [ see, Restructuring the security forces for a new South Africa.]

In his later years, Garba was reported as holding a desire to lead Nigeria, and said so publicly in 1995. During the Abacha transition program he was a member of the United Nigeria Congress Party (UNCP), In the fourth republic he joined the All Nigeria People's Party, although he was never elected to public office. From 1999, he was Director General of the National Institute for Policy and Strategic Studies in Nigeria, and while carrying out the duties of this office in Abuja he died on 1 June 2002. Garba was survived by his wife and six children.

Following his death the president of the Nigerian Senate, Anyim Pius, described Garba as "one of [Nigeria's] finest diplomats, patriots and staunch advocates of an indivisible and indissolable African continent", referring to Garba's strong belief in and advocacy of Pan-Africanism.

== Publications ==
- Garba, Joseph Nanven (1982). Revolution in Nigeria: Another View. London: Africa Books. ISBN 0-903274-15-9.
- Garba, Joseph Nanven (1987). Diplomatic Soldiering: Nigerian Foreign Policy, 1975-1979. Ibadan: Spectrum Books. ISBN 978-2461-76-8.
- Garba, Joseph Nanven (1993). The Honour To Serve: reflections On Nigeria’s Presidency of the 44th U.N. General Assembly. Ibadan: Heinemann Educational Books (Nigeria). ISBN 978-129-285-7
- Garba, Joseph Nanven (1993). Towards Sustainable Peace and Security in Southern Africa. New York, N.Y.: Institute of International Education.
- Garba, Joseph Nanven (1994). Restructuring the security forces for a new South Africa, New York, N.Y.: Institute of International Education ISBN 978-0-87206-210-8
- Garba, Joseph Nanven (1995). Fractured History: Elite Shifts and Policy Changes in Nigeria. Princeton: Sungai Books. ISBN 0-9635245-4-2.

Diplomatic posts
Preceded by Dante Maria Caputo	President of the United Nations General Assembly; 1989–1990	Succeeded by Guido de Marco
Political offices
Preceded by Arikpo Okoi	Foreign Minister of Nigeria; 1975–1978	Succeeded by Henry Adefope
