= Nick Scheele =

English businessman, Chancellor of the University of Warwick (1944–2014)

Sir Nicholas Vernon Scheele KCMG (3 January 1944 – 18 July 2014) was an English business executive who served as president, from 2001–05, and Chief Operating Officer (COO), from 2001–04, of the Ford Motor Company, and also as Chancellor of the University of Warwick from March 2002 to July 2008. Prior to being Chief Operating Officer for Ford, Scheele was responsible for European operations and has also been Chief Executive of Jaguar, then a Ford subsidiary.

== Biography ==
Born in Brentwood, Essex, the elder son of Werner J. Scheele and his wife, Norah E. Scheele (née Gough) He was educated at Brentwood School and went on to study at St Cuthbert's, Durham University. After graduation, he joined the Ford Motor Company.

Scheele was fluent in German, French and Spanish, which served him well when he became the chairman of Ford of Europe. An advocate of private funding for universities and strong links to business, in an interview for the BBC, he said: "I think in the future, education and industry need to become even more closely linked than they have been historically. As government funding changes, the replacement could well come through private funding from companies, individuals and grant-giving agencies."

Scheele was also chairman of the Prince of Wales Business and Environment Committee, and chaired the manufacturing group of Foresight 2020. Foresight is a UK government programme which aims to identify the UK's future needs and to build bridges between industry, science and government.

Scheele became a Non-Executive Director of British American Tobacco (BAT) in February 2005.

== Honours ==
Scheele was appointed Knight Commander of the Order of St Michael and St George (KCMG) in 2001 for services to British exports.

== Death ==
He died at the age of 70 on 18 July 2014.

Academic offices
Preceded by Shridath Ramphal	Chancellor of the University of Warwick; 2003–2008	Succeeded by Richard Lambert
