= Tapia House Movement =

The Tapia House Movement was a political party in Trinidad and Tobago. It first contested national elections in 1976, when it finished fourth with 3.9% of the vote, but failed to win a seat. In the 1981 elections it ran as part of the Trinidad and Tobago National Alliance together with the United Labour Front and the Democratic Action Congress, but saw its vote share drop to 2.3% and it remained seatless. The party did not contest any further elections.

== See also ==
- Lloyd Best
