= George Alleyne =

Barbadian United Nations official

Sir George Allanmore Ogarren Alleyne, OCC (born in St. Philip, Barbados, on 7 October 1932) served as United Nations Secretary-General's Special Envoy for HIV/AIDS in the Caribbean region 2003–2010. He was appointed to the position by UN Secretary-General Kofi Annan in February 2003.

== Early life and education ==
George Allanmore Ogarren Alleyne was born in 1932 at Lucas street in St. Philip, Barbados, to a mother who was a homemaker and a father who was an elementary school teacher. He took his early education from Holy Trinity Boys school. He graduated from Harrison College in 1950 with the Barbados Scholarship in the Classics. He studied medicine and earned Bachelor of Medicine and Bachelor of Surgery at the University College of the West Indies and graduated as the gold medallist in 1957. He later earned Doctor of Medicine from University of London in 1965. Later he pursued his postgraduate training in internal medicine in the United States.

== Personal life ==
He is married to Sylvan I. Chen and they have three children.

== Career ==
In 1972, Alleyne became Professor of Medicine at UWI. In 1976, he was appointed Chairman of the Department of Medicine. In October 2003 he was appointed Chancellor of the University of West Indies.

Besides his academic experience, Alleyne also gained much experience in working for international organizations. In February 1995, he became Director of the Pan American Health Organization (PAHO), Regional Office of the World Health Organization (WHO). He served two four-year terms in this position until the end of January 2003 and was elected director emeritus. After his retirement, Alleyne was appointed by WHO Director-General Tedros Adhanom Ghebreyesus to serve on the Independent High-level Commission on Non-Communicable Diseases from 2018 until 2019.

== Recognition ==
Alleyne was made a Knight Bachelor by Queen Elizabeth II in the 1990 New Year Honours, and awarded the Order of the Caribbean Community in 2001 - the highest honour that can be bestowed on a Caribbean national. In October 2008 he received the Science of Peace Award from the Inter American Heart Foundation. On June 14, 2017, he was awarded an honorary Doctorate of Science from the University of Toronto.
