= Zayed International Prize for the Environment =

- Description: Promoting sustainable development and environmental protection
- Country: United Arab Emirates
- Presented by: Zayed International Foundation for the Environment
- Reward: $1,000,000 (Total)
- Website: zayedprize.org.ae

The Zayed International Prize for the Environment is a prize awarded by the Zayed International Foundation for the Environment.

The Zayed Prize, worth 1 million US dollars is awarded every two years, in the name of the late Sheikh Zayed Bin Sultan Al Nahyan, based on stringent selection criteria.

The Zayed Prize is classified into four award categories. The recipient of the Global Leadership on the Environment component receives US$500,000, the recipient of the Scientific and Technological Achievement component receives US$250,000, and the recipient of the Environmental Action Leading to Positive Change in Society component receives US$200,000 and Young Scientists Award for Environmental Sustainability US$50,000 The value of the prize is the highest of any environmental prize.

The prize was established in 1999 by Sheikh Mohammed bin Rashid Al Maktoum and was first awarded in 2001. The prize was named after Sheikh Zayed Bin Sultan Al Nahyan.

== Award Criteria ==
The nomination for the Zayed International Prize for the Environment is open to all individuals, groups, companies, institutions, bodies, governmental and non-governmental organizations who meet the conditions and specifications mentioned below. The award is eligible for anyone who succeeds in achieving one or more of the following:

- Highlighting the environmental approach and its contribution to achieving sustainable development
- Activating the mechanism of joint work regionally and internationally in resolving environmental issues.
- Successfully addressing and permanently resolving a specific environmental issue.
- Successfully bringing important environmental issues to the attention of the public and authorities, and mobilizing and mobilizing local, regional or international efforts to work on resolving these issues and addressing them successfully
- Effective participation in developing theoretical or practical concepts and methods related to environmental affairs and concerns.
- Implementing initiatives or activities that lead to positive change in society and serve as a model for other societies.

The achievement nominated for the award must be pioneering and distinguished by creativity, and the role of the nominated person or entity in it must be direct and clear.

== Winners ==
=== Global Leadership on the Environment ===
2001	Jimmy Carter
2003	British Broadcasting Corporation
2005	Kofi Annan
2008	Gro Harlem Brundtland
2011	Lee Myung-bak
2014	Albert II of Monaco

=== Scientific and Technological Achievement ===
2001	Mohamed El-Kassas	World Commission on Dams	
2003	Godwin Obasi	Mostafa Tolba	Bert Bolin
2005	Millennium Ecosystem Assessment		
2008	Jane Lubchenco	V. Ramanathan	
2011	Partha Dasgupta		
2014	Ashok Khosla	Zakri Abdul Hamid	

=== Environmental Action Leading to Positive Change in Society ===
2001	Yolanda Kakabadse	Stephan Schmidheiny
2003	Badria Al Awadhi	Jamal Mohamed Safi
2005	Angela Cropper	Emil Salim
2008	Environment Development Action in the Third World	Tierramérica
2011	Mathis Wackernagel	Najib Saab
2014	Luc Hoffmann	Paula Caballero Gómez

== See also ==
- List of environmental awards
