= Nigeria Centenary Awards =

Nigeria award show

The Nigeria Centenary Awards was an award ceremony that was held in 2014. The award was inaugurated as part of Nigeria's centenary celebration in 2014. It was organized by the government of the Federal Republic of Nigeria and designed to acknowledge and celebrate the efforts of remarkable individuals who significantly impacted the nation's growth, unity, and development across diverse fields. The awards honored 100 individuals for their contributions towards the progress and unity of Nigeria.

The award ceremony which was held on 28 February 2014 saw President Goodluck Jonathan handing out 100 awards to 100 individuals – more than 50 post-humously – who made their marks in Nigeria's first 100 years.

== Award Categories ==
The awards were categorized based on sectors and themes to highlight the diverse contributions made by recipients. Each category recognized exceptional achievements and exemplary dedication in a specific area of influence. There were 12 categories in all:

- Heroes of the struggle for Nigeria's independence/pioneer political leaders
- Pioneers in professional callings/career
- Pioneers in commerce and industry
- Promoters of democratic transition in Nigeria
- Heroes in global sports competitions
- Accomplished pioneer public servants
- Accomplished contemporary entrepreneurs
- Distinguished academics
- Internationally acclaimed artists, literary icons and journalists
- Outstanding bravery and public spiritedness
- Outstanding promoters of unity, patriotism and national development
- Exemplary service in the promotion of peace and excellence.

== Ceremony and recognition ==
The awards ceremony took place at the banquet hall of the Presidential Villa on Friday, 28 February 2014, and was attended by seven of Nigeria's living former heads of state at that time: Yakubu Gowon, Chief Olusegun Obasanjo, Alhaji Shehu Shagari, Gen. Muhammadu Buhari, Gen. Ibrahim Babangida, Chief Ernest Shonekan, and Gen. Abdusalami Abubakar. Also in attendance were President Joyce Banda of Malawi; her Sierra Leonean counterpart, Ernest Bai Koroma; as well as the Vice President of Kenya.

== Notable recipients ==
Three families achieved the unique feat of having two members each awarded. Among them were the Lugards - Frederick, Nigeria's inaugural Governor-General, and his spouse Flora. Similarly, the Ransome-Kutis had two recipients: women political leader, Funmilayo and her son, the originator of Afrobeat, Fela. Also, the Yar’Adua siblings, comprising Shehu Musa, an army general and politician, and his younger brother Umaru, who served as Nigeria's only civilian president to pass away while in office.

== UK and US versions ==
The Nigeria Centenary U.S. Awards (NCUSA) was organized by Royal Maids in partnership with the Consulate General of Nigeria in New York City, the event was held on September 27, 2014. NCUSA recognized outstanding achievements across various sectors, spotlighting the commitment and impact of honorees within their respective spheres. In the United Kingdom, the Nigeria Centenary Awards UK commemorated the accomplishments of the 100 most remarkable Nigerians who had significantly influenced the UK landscape. The event, held at East London's Waltham Forest Town Hall on June 27, 2014, and was organized by Ben TV in collaboration with the Nigeria High Commission.

== Criticism of the awards ==
The Nigeria Centenary Awards faced criticism, with concerns raised about the selection process and the inclusion of individuals in the honoree list. Critics suggested that political correctness influenced the choices, questioning the automatic reverence bestowed upon anyone who had led Nigeria, equating leadership with instant recognition as a national hero. There were reservations about the selection of awardees from a pool of over 160 million people, highlighting the challenge of condensing recognition to only 100 individuals. Some critics noted discrepancies in categories, citing an imbalance in the representation of academics versus artists. The composition of certain categories was questioned, with surprise expressed over the absence of certain individuals and the inclusion of others in seemingly incongruous groups. Specifically, criticism targeted the omission of notable figures such as Colonel Adekunle Fajuyi and sports pioneers like Hogan Bassey and Emmanuel Ifeajuna. There were also calls for the inclusion of influential traditional rulers and pioneer political leaders, whose absence was deemed conspicuous. Also, concerns were raised about factual inaccuracies within the documentation. Errors in categorization, citations, and historical details led to skepticism about the thoroughness of the selection process and the credibility of the document itself. Some citations seemed to focus on personal details unrelated to the individuals' merits, raising questions about the intent behind such inclusions. Critics argued that the document failed to adequately represent Nigeria's diverse history and achievements, emphasizing the importance of meticulousness and accuracy in compiling such prestigious records for posterity and international recognition.

The family of the late M.K.O Abiola, Gani Fawehinmi, and late afrobeat maestro, Fela Anikulapo Kuti, rejected the posthumous awards on their patriarchs.

== See also ==
- Order of the Federal Republic
