= Wusasa =

Town in Kaduna State, Nigeria

- Town
- Interactive map of Wusasa
- Location within Nigeria
- Coordinates: 11°4′31.71″N 7°41′8.26″E
- Country: Nigeria
- State: Kaduna State
- LGA: Zaria
- Established: 1929

Wusasa is a town just outside the major city of Zaria in Kaduna State in Northern Nigeria.

== Notable people ==
- R. A. B. Dikko
- Darius Ishaku
- Isawa
