= Arnold Smith =

Canadian diplomat (1915–1994)

Arnold Smith OC CH
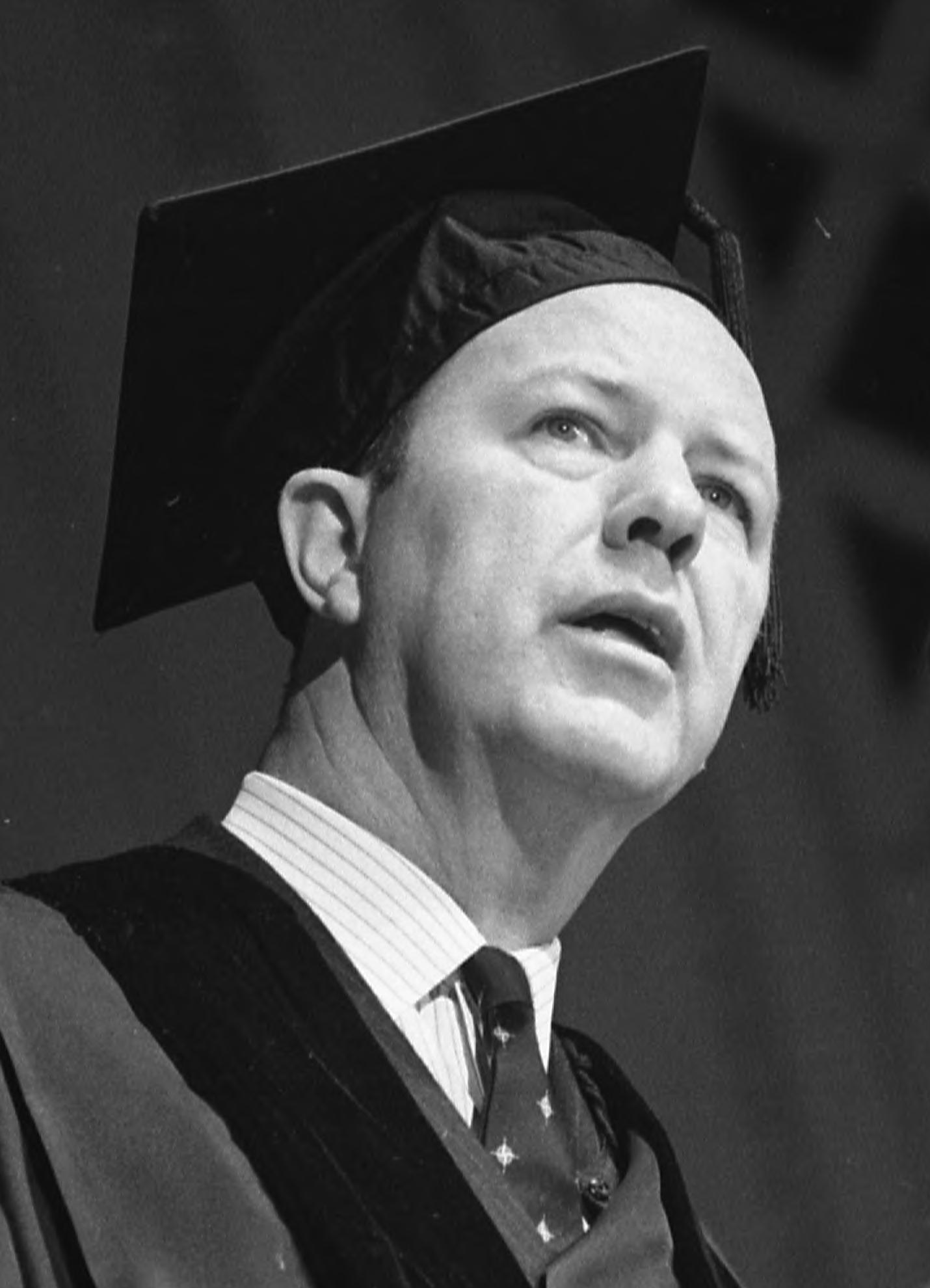

1st Secretary-General of the Commonwealth of Nations
- In office 1 July 1965 – 30 June 1975
- Head: Elizabeth II
- Preceded by: Position established
- Succeeded by: Sir Shridath Ramphal

Personal details
- Born: Arnold Cantwell Smith; 18 January 1915 Toronto, Ontario, Canada
- Died: 7 February 1994 (aged 79) Toronto, Ontario, Canada

Arnold Cantwell Smith OC CH (January 18, 1915 – February 7, 1994) was a Canadian diplomat. He was the first Commonwealth Secretary-General, serving from 1965 to 1975.

A talented student, he won a Rhodes Scholarship to Christ Church, Oxford.

From 1958 to 1961, he was the Canadian Ambassador to Egypt. From 1961 to 1963, he was the Canadian Ambassador to the USSR. During his time at the Commonwealth Secretariat, the Commonwealth flag was designed on his and Prime Minister Pierre Trudeau's initiative.

In 1975 he was made a member of the Order of the Companions of Honour. In 1984, he was made an Officer of the Order of Canada for "a long and distinguished diplomatic career".

Arnold Smith was the elder brother of Wilfred Cantwell Smith.

His published work includes Stitches In Time; the Commonwealth in World Politics.

Political offices
Preceded by None	Commonwealth Secretaries-General; 1965-1975	Succeeded by Sir Shridath Ramphal
