= Lloyd Best =

Trinidad and Tobago politician

Lloyd Algernon Best
- Born: 27 February 1934
- Died: 19 March 2007 (aged 73)

Academic background
- Education: University of Cambridge Oxford University
- Influences: Arthur Lewis

Academic work
- Discipline: economics, politics, epistemology, sociology
- School or tradition: plantation economy, Caribbean structuralism, historical institutionalism
- Institutions: University of the West Indies
- Awards: Order of the Caribbean Community

Lloyd Algernon Best, OCC (27 February 1934 – 19 March 2007) was a Trinidadian intellectual, columnist, professor, and economist.

== Biography ==
Lloyd Best first attended the Tacarigua Anglican School. He then won a Government Exhibition Scholarship to Queen's Royal College, in Port of Spain, Trinidad and Tobago. From here, he won a Trinidad and Tobago Island Scholarship to pursue higher studies, thence to graduate from the University of Cambridge and Oxford University in Great Britain. In 1957, he joined the Faculty of the University of the West Indies in Mona, Jamaica, as a Research Fellow.

He continued to serve as a Professor in Economics here until 1976, when he resigned to work full-time with the Tapia House Movement, a political, social and economic organisation based in Trinidad and Tobago. As a political party, Tapia House was unsuccessful in gaining seats in the 1976 elections, but some of the party's members helped to form the National Alliance for Reconstruction, that won the 1986 General Elections.

Lloyd Best served as the Leader of the Opposition in the Senate from 1974 to 1975 and then from 1981 to 1983. During this period, he was also the founder of the Trinidad and Tobago Institute of the West Indies (known since 2007 as the Lloyd Best Institute of the West Indies).

Even though he was in failing health, during the last two weeks before his death, Lloyd Best was hard at work with his colleague and fellow Tapia house member Eric St Cyr, completing his newest work, titled Economic Policy and Management Choices: A Contemporary Economic History of Trinidad and Tobago, 1950-52.

== Death ==
Lloyd Best died at his home, aged 73, from prostate cancer and diabetes. He was twice married, first (1958–2006) to Christiane Best, with whom he had four children—three boys and a girl. He is survived by his second wife, journalist Sunity Maharaj, with whom he had two daughters.

== Academic work ==
Lloyd Best was associated with the New World Group (NWG), formed in 1962 in Georgetown, Guyana. The aim of this group was to develop an indigenous theory that explains the dynamics of Caribbean economies and societies. Out of this effort came the Plantation Model of Caribbean Economies and Societies. The model separated Caribbean economies into the three following historical phases:

1. The pure plantation economy (1600 – 1838)
2. The plantation economy modified (1839 – 1938)
3. The plantation economy further modified (1939 - ....)

During the first phase, the economy is characterised by slavery as the main mode of production, with the plantation system as the main unit of production. The second phase realises the abolition of the slave system and the introduction of wage labour in an indentured form. The third phase is differentiated by the emergence of a limited and restricted level of economic diversity with activities such as peasant agriculture, mining, as well as wholesale and retail trade that starts to compete with plantation agriculture.

== Selected bibliography ==
- Essays on the Theory of Plantation Economy: A Historical and Institutional Approach to Caribbean Economic Development, 2009
- Economic Liberalisation and Caribbean Development: Proceedings of a Panel Discussion, 1993
- "Trinidad and Tobago Unit Trust Corporation: 10 Years of Success," 1992
- "Outline of a model of pure plantation economy," 1968
