= Henry Adefope =

Foreign minister of Nigeria (1926–2012)

Major General Henry Adefope
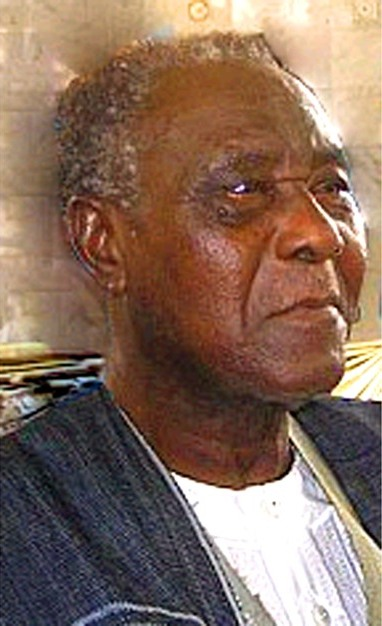
- Henry Adefope in the International Olympic Committee

Federal Commissioner for External Affairs
- In office 1978–1979
- Preceded by: Joseph Nanven Garba
- Succeeded by: Ishaya Audu

Personal details
- Born: 15 March 1926 Kaduna, Nigeria
- Died: 11 March 2012 (aged 85)

Military service
- Allegiance: Nigeria
- Branch/service: Nigerian Army
- Rank: Major general

Henry Edmund Olufemi Adefope (15 March 1926 – 11 March 2012) was a Nigerian Army major general who served as Minister of Foreign Affairs and as a member of the International Olympic Committee from 1985 to 2006 and an honorary member of the International Olympic Committee since 2007.

== Early life and education ==
Henry Adefope was born on 15 March 1926 in Kaduna, Nigeria to Alice Adefope and Chief Adefope. He was educated at CMS Grammar School, Lagos and Glasgow University, graduating in General medicine in 1952. He worked as a doctor from 1953 to 1963 and was then commissioned into the Nigerian Army in 1963.

== Career ==
He rose to the rank of Major General and served as Director of Medical Services. From 1975 to 1978 he served as Minister of Labour and from 1978 to 1979 served as Minister of Foreign Affairs, both cabinet portfolios under the military administration of General Olusegun Obasanjo.

Adefope also served in a variety of positions in sports administration, including terms as the President of the Nigerian Olympic Committee from 1967 to 1976 and as Vice-President of the Commonwealth Games Federation from 1974 to 1982. In 1985 he was elected to the IOC. While with the IOC, he has been a member of the commissions that selected the host cities for the 2000 and 2004 Summer Olympic Games. He was investigated, but exonerated in regards to the 2002 Winter Olympic bid scandal. He became an IOC Honorary Member in 2006.

== Family ==
Adefope was a father, grandfather and great-grandfather. His children include Femi Adefope, Dotun Okojie, Folake Nedd, Ronke Eso, Seyi Adefope, Niyi Adefope and Toyin Adeyeye.

== Death ==
Henry Adefope died on 11 March 2012 at the age of 85, four days shy of his 86th birthday.

Political offices
| Preceded by Joseph Nanven Garba | Foreign Minister of Nigeria; 1978 – 1979 | Succeeded by Ishaya Audu |
