= Victoria Adaobi Obasi =

Current substantive vice chancellor of Imo State University

- Born: Victoria Adaobi Obasi; 14 April 1952 (age 74); Imo State
- Citizenship: Nigerian
- Education: University of Hull, University of Nigeria
- Occupations: Educationist, Administrator
- Employer: Imo State University
- Spouse: Chief Charles Obasi

Victoria Adaobi Obasi // (born 14 April 1952) is a former Vice Chancellor of Imo State University. She is from Ogboko in Ideato South Local Government Area of Imo State Nigeria. Between 2011–2013, she was Commissioner for Education in Imo State.

== Early life and marriage ==
Victoria Adaobi Obasi was born into the family of Chief Fred and Ezinne Felicia Nnoham. She married Chief Charles Obasi of Dim Na Nume in Isu Nwangele Local Government Area, Imo State and has five children.

== Education ==
Obasi began elementary school at Holy Rosary Primary School, Oguta and completed her secondary studies at Holy Rosary Secondary, Ihioma. She proceeded to the Alvan Ikoku Federal College of Education, Owerri (now affiliated with University of Nigeria Enugu). She earned her Bachelor's degree in Zoology from the University of Hull, England in 1984, a Master's degree the following year, and a Doctorate degree in 1989, all from the same institution. In 1980, she finished her National Youth Service Corps (NYSC) training at Enugu.

== Academic and administrative achievements ==
As a scholar, Obasi has written five books and published numerous articles in reputable local and international journals. As Vice Chancellor, she initiated transformative reforms and policies, including infrastructure development, program accreditation, and research promotion.

== Awards and honors ==
Throughout Obasi's career, she has received numerous awards and honors. She was awarded the Bursary Award for Excellence by the University of Hull in 1987, 1988, and 1989. In 2008, she received the National Merit Award from the Federal Government of Nigeria. Her contributions to education were recognized in 2012 when she was honored with the Icon of Education Award by the West African Students' Union Parliament (WASUP). In 2016, she was presented with the Women in Education Leadership Award by the African Women in Leadership Organization (AWLO). The same year, she was named the Most Outstanding Vice Chancellor by the National Association of Nigerian Students (NANS). Her leadership was further acknowledged in 2017 with the African Women in Leadership Excellence Award from the Centre for Economic and Leadership Development (CELD). In 2018, she received the Distinguished Alumni Award from the University of Nigeria, Nsukka (UNN).

== Membership and affiliations ==
- Member, Nigeria Academy of Education (NAE)
- Fellow, Curriculum Organization of Nigeria (CON)
- Member, College of Preceptors England (CPE)
- Member, World Council of Curriculum and Instruction (WCCI)
- Fellow, Gender Studies Association of Nigeria, FGSAN
- Department of Curriculum, Imo State University

== Religion ==
Obasi is a Christian, and a Lady of St. Christopher Anglican Communion.
