= Special session of the United Nations General Assembly =

Type of United Nations meeting

A special session of the United Nations General Assembly, or UNGASS, occurs when the United Nations General Assembly meets in order to discuss an important wide-ranging topic.

Under Chapter IV, article 20 of the United Nations Charter, "Special sessions shall be convoked by the Secretary-General at the request of the Security Council or of a majority of the Members of the United Nations." The request of the Security Council requires a vote of nine or more of its fifteen members. However, since 1975, all special sessions have been called by the General Assembly.

Each special session deals exclusively with one topic with a short agenda. They are typically high-level events with the participation of heads of state and government and government ministers. A special session usually adopts one or two outcome documents, such as a political declaration, action plan or a strategy. Special sessions last from one to several days. Like a regular annual session, a special session consists of both formal and informal plenary meetings, with a Committee of the Whole negotiating the outcome document.

== Procedure ==
The procedure to call a special session are laid out in the Rules of Procedure of the General Assembly. The rules pertaining to special sessions are as follow:

- Rule 7:
  - Allows for the General Assembly to fix a date for a special session (in accordance with Article 20 of the Charter).
- Rule 8(a):
  - Requires special sessions to be convened within fifteen days of the receipt by the Secretary-General of a request for such a session from the Security Council or from a majority of the Members of the United Nations
- Rule 9(a):
  - Allows any Member State of the United Nations to request the Secretary-General convene a special session. The Secretary-General must then inform other Members of the request and inquire whether they concur with it. If a majority do within thirty days, a special session of the General Assembly shall be convened.
- Rule 10:
  - Requires the Secretary-General to notify Member States, at least fourteen days in advance, of the opening of a special session convened at the request of the Security Council. This time period is changed to at least ten days in advance in the case of a session convened at the request of a majority of Members.
- Rule 16:
  - Requires the provisional agenda of a special session convened at the request of the Security Council to be communicated to the Member States at least fourteen days before the opening of the session, or at least ten days before the opening of the session for sessions convened at the request of a majority of Member States.
- Rule 17:
  - Requires that the provisional agenda for a special session only consist of those items proposed for consideration in the request for the holding of the session.
- Rule 18:
  - Allows for supplementary items to be added to the agenda by any Member States, principal organ of the United Nations or the Secretary-General at least four days before the date fixed for the opening of a special session. Such items are placed on a supplementary list.
- Rule 19:
  - During a special session, items on the supplementary list and additional items may be added to the agenda by a two-thirds majority of the members present and voting.

== Sessions ==
Special session	Topic	Convened by	Date	Resolution
First	Palestine	United Kingdom of Great Britain and Northern Ireland	28 April – 15 May 1947	A/310
Second	Palestine	United Nations General Assembly	16 April – 14 May 1948	A/555
Third	Tunisia	Afghanistan; Brazil; Burma; Cambodia; Ceylon; Congo (Léopoldville); Cuba; Cyprus; Ethiopia; Federation of Malaya; Ghana; Guinea; India; Indonesia; Iran; Iraq; Jordan; Laos; Lebanon; Liberia; Libya; Mali; Morocco; Nepal; Nigeria; Pakistan; Philippines; Saudi Arabia; Somalia; Sudan; Thailand; Togo; Tunisia; Turkey; United Arab Republic; Upper Volta; Yemen; Yugoslavia Reference:	21 – 25 August 1961	A/4860
Fourth	Financial situation of the United Nations	United Nations General Assembly	14 May – 27 June 1963	A/5441
Fifth	South West Africa (Namibia)	United Nations General Assembly	21 April – 13 June 1967	A/6657
Sixth	Raw materials and development	Algeria	9 April – 2 May 1974	A/9559
Seventh	Development and international economic cooperation	United Nations General Assembly	1 – 16 Septembre 1975	A/10301
Eighth	Financing of the United Nations Interim Force in Lebanon	United Nations General Assembly	20 – 21 April 1978	A/S-8/10
Ninth	Namibia	United Nations General Assembly	24 April – 3 May 1978	A/S-9/13
Tenth	Disarmament	United Nations General Assembly	23 May – 30 June 1978	A/S-10/4
Eleventh	New International Economic Order	United Nations General Assembly	25 August – 15 September 1980	A/S-11/3
Twelfth	Disarmament	United Nations General Assembly	7 June – 10 July 1982	A/S-12/6
Thirteenth	Africa	United Nations General Assembly	27 May – 1 June 1986	A/S-13/16
Fourteenth	Namibia	United Nations General Assembly	17 – 20 September 1986	A/S-14/10
Fifteenth	Disarmament	United Nations General Assembly	31 May – 25 June 1988	A/S-15/6
Sixteenth	Apartheid	United Nations General Assembly	12 – 14 December 1989	A/S-16/5
Seventeenth	Drug abuse	United Nations General Assembly	20 – 23 February 1990	A/S-17/13
Eighteenth	International economic cooperation (economic growth and developing nations)	United Nations General Assembly	23 – 27 April 1990	A/S-18/15
Nineteenth	Earth Summit + 5	United Nations General Assembly	23 – 27 June 1997	A/S-19/33
Twentieth	World drug problem	United Nations General Assembly	8 – 10 June 1998	A/S-20/14
Twenty-first	Population and development	United Nations General Assembly	30 June – 2 July 1999	A/S-21/7
Twenty-second	Small Island Developing States	United Nations General Assembly	27 – 28 September 1999	A/S-22/11
Twenty-third	Women 2000: Gender Equality, Development and Peace for the Twenty-First Century	United Nations General Assembly	5 – 10 June 2000	A/S-23/13
Twenty-fourth	Social Development	United Nations General Assembly	26 – 30 June 2000	A/S-24/10
Twenty-fifth	Implementation of the outcome of the UN Conference on Human Settlements (Habitat II)	United Nations General Assembly	6 – 8 June 2001	A/S-25/9
Twenty-sixth	Problem of human immunodeficiency virus/acquired immunodeficiency syndrome (HIV/AIDS) in all its aspects	United Nations General Assembly	25 – 27 June 2001	A/S-26/7
Twenty-seventh	World Summit for Children	United Nations General Assembly	8 – 10 May 2002	A/S-27/24
Twenty-eighth	Commemoration of the 60th anniversary of the liberation of the Nazi concentration camps	United Nations General Assembly	24 January 2005	A/RES/59/26
Twenty-ninth	Follow-up to the Programme of Action of the International Conference on Population and Development beyond 2014	United Nations General Assembly	22 September 2014	A/RES/67/250
Thirtieth	World drug problem	United Nations General Assembly	19 – 21 April 2016	A/RES/67/193; A/RES/69/200; A/RES/70/181

== See also ==
- Emergency special session of the United Nations General Assembly
