= R. A. B. Dikko =

Nigerian physician and politician

Russel Aliyu Barau Dikko (1912–1977) was a Nigerian physician, public servant and politician. He is widely regarded as the first medical doctor from Northern Nigeria. He served as the Federal Commissioner for Mines and Power from 1967 to 1971 and later as the Federal Commissioner for Transport during the military administration of General Yakubu Gowon.

== Early life and education ==
Dikko was born in 1912 in Wusasa, Zaria, in present-day Kaduna State. He attended the Church Missionary Society (CMS) Elementary School in Wusasa before enrolling at King's College, Lagos.

He later studied medicine at the University of Birmingham in the United Kingdom, becoming the first qualified medical doctor from Northern Nigeria.

== Career ==
Following his medical training, Dikko returned to Nigeria in 1940 and joined the colonial medical service as a junior medical officer. He was promoted to senior medical officer in 1953 and became principal medical officer in the Endemic Diseases Division of the Northern Nigeria Ministry of Health in 1960.

During the military government of General Yakubu Gowon, Dikko was appointed Federal Commissioner for Mines and Power in 1967. In 1971, he became Federal Commissioner for Transport.

Dikko was also a founding member of Jam'iyyar Mutanen Arewa, a northern cultural organisation that later became associated with the Northern People's Congress (NPC).

== Legacy ==
The Barau Dikko Teaching Hospital in Kaduna is named in his honour in recognition of his contributions to medicine and public service in Northern Nigeria.
