= Okigbo =

Okigbo is a surname. Notable people with the surname include:

- Bede Okigbo (1926–2017), Nigerian plant pathologist and geneticist
- Christopher Okigbo (1932–1967), Nigerian poet
- Michael Odokara-Okigbo (born 1990), American singer
- Pius Okigbo (1924–2000), Nigerian academic
