= Government College Umuahia =

Government College, Umuahia

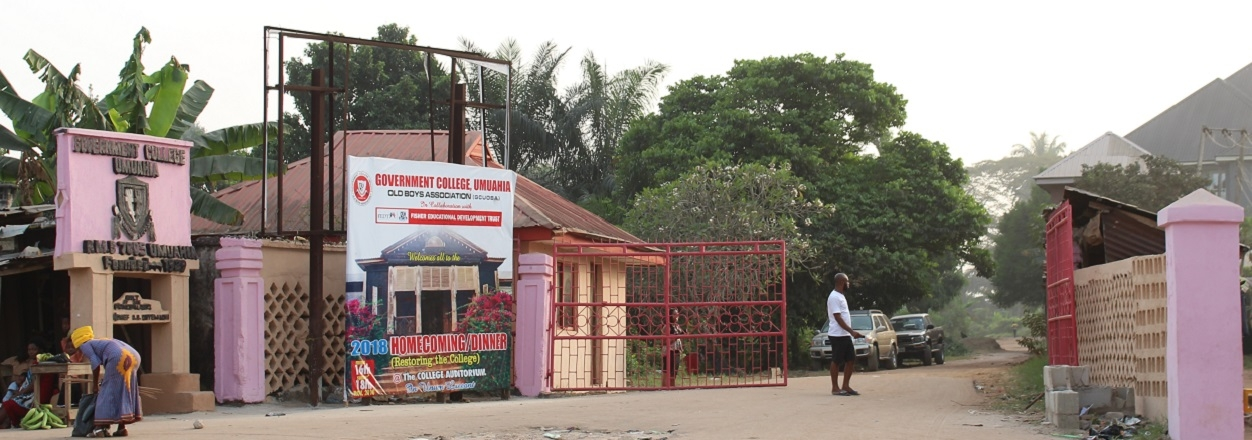

Location
- Umuahia-Ikot Ekpene Road; Umuahia, Abia State; Nigeria; 5.499367°N 7.538167°E

Information
- Type: Secondary school
- Motto: In Unum Luceant (May They Shine as One)
- Established: 1929
- Founder: Rev. Robert Fisher
- Gender: Male
- Age: 11 to 18
- Houses: 11 (Cozens, Erekosima, Extension, Fisher, Kent, New, Niger, Nile, School, Simpson, Wareham)
- Colours: Red, Pink & Brown
- Publication: The Umuahian (formerly "The Eastern Star" and "The Red Star")
- Pupils: Umuahians
- Former pupils: Umuahians, Old Boys
- Spouses of Old Boys: Young Girls
- Website: gcu.sch.ng

Government College Umuahia, or GCU, is an independent secondary school for boys located on Umuahia-Ikot Ekpene road in Umuahia, Nigeria.

Twenty years after the establishment of King's College, the first government-owned high school, by the British colonial government, three similar public schools were founded in 1929. These three institutions, Government College Umuahia (GCU), Government College, Ibadan and Government College Zaria (now Barewa College), were designed to follow the traditions of British public schools such as Eton, Harrow and Winchester. The GCU was known as the 'Eton of the East,' at that time because it was located in Nigeria's orient and was known for its elite standards and selectivity.

Rev. Robert Fisher was the founding principal of GCU.

On December 22, 2014, a Deed of Trust was signed with the Abia State government, thereby vesting the Fisher Educational Trust with all legal interests, rights and power pertaining to ownership, management, operation, control and funding of Government College Umuahia. The trust was set up by the Government College Umuahia Old Boys' Association.

== History ==
In 1927, the British Colonial Government in Lagos started three new secondary schools for boys, namely a school in Ibadan (Government College, Ibadan), in Zaria (now Barewa College) was founded in 1921] also Government College Bida was founded in 1912) and in Umuahia (Government College Umuahia). King's College, Lagos had started twenty years earlier in 1909. These four schools were modelled after the famous English public schools – Eton and Harrow. The Queen's College, Lagos (for girls) had opened that year. The onus for starting the Government College Umuahia fell on an English educator, mathematician, and Anglican priest, the Rev. Robert Fisher who had been a teacher at the Achimota College, Accra, and education administrator in the Gold Coast, now Ghana. He served as the first principal of the Government College Umuahia from 1929 to 1939.

Robert Fisher arrived in Umuahia in 1927 and acquired land of 10 square miles (26 km^{2}). On January 29, 1929 he opened the gates of the school to 25 students drawn from all parts of Nigeria and West Africa, but with catchment in Eastern Nigeria, and the Southern Cameroons. The Government College Umuahia began in 1929 as a teacher training institute and in 1930, converted to a secondary school. Fisher ran this school until 1939 when, at the start of the Second World War, he left for England on retirement and was replaced by William N. Tolfree. The school was closed thereafter, and for three years it was used as a prisoner of war camp for detaining German and Italian prisoners captured in Cameroon by the British and the students and staff were suddenly dispersed to King's College, Lagos, and to other mission schools east of the Niger.

== Academics ==
GCU has drawn students from among the best performing from Nigeria and Southern Cameroons. It has classrooms and laboratories. Its students consistently achieve high scores in exam results at SSCE, O-Level and A-Level. All students complete core courses in the Arts and Sciences.

Students participate in sports like cricket, hockey, handball and football There are two standard fields (the Upper and Lower fields), cricket pavilions, seven lawn tennis courts, basketball court; and Olympic-size track field. It has a nine-hole golf course; a botanical garden, and an aquarium.

The English artist and archeologist, Kenneth C. Murray, pioneered modern art education in Nigeria when he left Balliol College, Oxford and arrived Nigeria in 1927 to teach art. He taught art at the Government College Umuahia from 1933 to 1939 and started the Art Gallery which had in its collection, the works of C.C. Ibeto, Uthman Ibrahim, and the early charcoal drawings of Ben Enwonwu. The gallery was looted and destroyed during the Nigerian-Biafra Civil War (1967–1970), when the school was closed to serve as the General Staff Headquarters of the secessionist Republic of Biafra. K.C. Murray himself had left Umuahia in 1939 to become Director/Surveyor of Nigerian Antiquities, and the editor of the Nigeria Magazine from work he did at Umuahia.

The Government College Umuahia also had an Officer Cadet Corps that offered instruction camps in field drills, and adventure training. It produced professionally trained military officers before the Nigerian civil war including General George Kurubo, first Southern Nigerian to be trained at Sandhurst and first Nigerian Chief of the Nigerian Air Force; General Alex Madiebo, General Officer Commanding the defunct Biafran Army, General Patrick Anwunah, Tim Onwuatuegwu, C.C. Emelifonwu, Ibanga Ekanem, August Okpe, Col. (Dr.) Bassey Inyang, etc.

Government College Umuahia also produces an unusually high number of literary elite who influenced African Literature more than any other educational institution.

== Restoration and Fisher Trust ==
Determined to put an end to years of decline of the college, the Government College Umuahia Old Boys' Association (GCUOBA), approached the government to take over ownership of the school to restructure, fund and manage sustainably. Again on January 1, 2024, the Old Boys of the Government College, Umuahia (GCU) made a statement that they are taking over the school from the state government to restore its lost glory. The National Secretary of the Old Boys Association, Mr Nkem Egbuta stated, "we have begun from the scratch again, trying to restore those values that made Umuahia so prominent and by the Grace of God, we are on the path to achieving that.”

In pursuit of the objective, a trust; Fisher Educational and Development Trust was established by the Old boys with directive from the state government. The trust was named after Rev. Robert Fisher, founding Principal of the College.

On December 22, 2014 a Deed of Trust was signed between the old boys and the Abia State government, thereby vesting the Trust with all legal interests, rights and power pertaining to ownership, management, operation, control and funding of Government College Umuahia.

The Trust is duly registered, in line with the laws of the Federal Republic of Nigeria. In 2022, the Federal Government of Nigeria allocated Appropriation Act for the execution of projects at the Federal Government College Umuahia. The appropriation was in compliance of the Public Procurement Act, 2007.

== Notable alumni ==
- Chinua Achebe, writer, novelist, first winner of the Nigerian National Order of Merit
- Mofia Tonjo Akobo, Nigeria's first minister of petroleum
- Godswill Akpabio, Minister of Health for Eastern Nigeria
- Elechi Amadi, novelist, mathematician, surveyor, soldier and public administrator
- Kelechi Amadi-Obi, lawyer, painter and photographer
- Anthony Aniagolu, Supreme Court justice
- I. N. C. Aniebo, novelist and soldier
- Okoi Arikpo, anthropologist and Foreign Minister of Nigeria (1967–1975)
- Nimi Briggs, Vice Chancellor of the University of Port Harcourt
- Edmund Daukoru, doctor and Minister of Oil
- Lazarus Ekwueme, actor, professor, musicologist, winner of the Nigerian National Order of Merit
- Dick W. Emuchay, medical doctor, educator and administrator
- Okechukwu Nwadiuto Emuchay, diplomat
- E. M. L. Endeley, former premier of Southern Cameroon
- Okechukwu Enelamah, medical doctor and Nigeria's Minister of Industry, Trade and Investment
- Nelson Enwerem, model, television personality and winner of Mr Nigeria 2018
- Ben Enwonwu, modernist sculptor and painter and winner of the Nigerian National Order of Merit
- Kelsey Harrison, professor of obstetrics and gynaecology, former vice-chancellor of the University of Port Harcourt, winner of the Nigerian National Order of Merit
- Chukwuemeka Ike, novelist, university administrator, winner of the Nigerian National Order of Merit
- Orji Uzor Kalu
- Peter Katjavivi, diplomat and politician
- George T. Kurubo, brigadier and first Nigerian Chief of the Nigerian Air Force
- Alexander Madiebo, Nigerian military officer
- Nfon Victor Mukete, Nigeria's first minister of information and prominent Cameroonian politician
- Obi Nwakanma, Nigerian poet
- Okwesilieze Nwodo
- Chukwuedu Nwokolo
- Jide Obi, lawyer and pop star
- Gabriel Okara, poet
- Chinedu Tochukwu Okere, Politician, Member House of Representatives, Owerri Federal Constituency, Imo State, 10th Assembly Nigeria
- J.O.J. Okezie, Nigeria's first minister of health
- Christopher Okigbo, poet and publisher
- Chu Okongwu, Minister of National Planning and Minister of Oil
- Domingo Okorie
- Charles Onyeama, World Court judge
- Idah Peterside, keeper for the Super Eagles
- Ken Saro-Wiwa, writer and environmental rights activist
- James Iroha Uchechukwu, sculptor and photographer
- Achike Udenwa, politician, former Governor of Imo State
- Jaja Wachuku, lawyer, Nigeria's first Speaker of the House of Representatives and Nigeria's first foreign minister
- Bede Okigbo, professor, plant pathologist and geneticist, traditionalist and former Vice-Chancellor of University of Nigeria, Nsukka
