= List of Nigerian diplomats =

This is a list of Nigerian diplomats. A diplomat is a person appointed by a state to conduct diplomacy with one or more other states or international organisations. The main functions of diplomats are: representation and protection of the interests and nationals of the sending state; initiation and facilitation of strategic agreements; treaties and conventions; promotion of information; trade and commerce; technology; and friendly relations.

== Nigerian diplomats ==
- Ayorinde Ajakaiye
- Catherine Obianuju Acholonu
- Adebayo Adedeji
- Adebowale Adefuye
- Ayo Aderinwale
- Hamzat Ahmadu
- Aduke Alakija
- Alhaji Abubakar Alhaji
- PM Brai
- Mohammed Mabdul
- Emeka Anyaoku
- Phillip Asiodu
- Chukwuma Azikiwe
- Oluseyi Bajulaiye
- Philip O. Emafo
- Okechukwu Nwadiuto Emuchay
- Pastor Samuel Udoko
- L. A. Fabunmi
- Antonio Deinde Fernandez
- Ibrahim Gambari
- Christopher Kolade
- Sebastian Okechukwu Mezu
- Kingsley Moghalu
- Tijjani Muhammad-Bande
- Bianca Odumegwu-Ojukwu
- Olusegun Olusola
- Michael Omolewa
- Adoga Onah
- Peter Onu
- Ebun Oyagbola
- Olu Oyesanya
- Mohammed Lawal Rafindadi
- Christopher Oluwole Rotimi
- Timothy Shelpidi
- Julius Momo Udochi
- Onyedika Chiegboka Ezenekwe
- Okon Uya
- Margaret Vogt
- Jaja Wachuku
- Bashir Yuguda
- Iyorwuese Hagher
- Wahab Adekola Akande

=== Foreign ministers of Nigeria ===
- Yusuf Tuggar
- Henry Adefope
- Oluyemi Adeniji
- Bolaji Akinyemi
- Emeka Anyaoku
- Olugbenga Ashiru
- Ishaya Audu
- Abubakar Tafawa Balewa
- Nuhu Bamalli
- Joseph Nanven Garba
- Tom Ikimi
- Baba Gana Kingibe
- Sule Lamido
- Ojo Maduekwe
- Matthew Mbu
- Ike Nwachukwu
- Joy Ogwu
- Arikpo Okoi
- Ngozi Okonjo-Iweala
- Ignatius Olisemeka
- Viola Onwuliri
- Geoffrey Onyeama
- Jaja Wachuku
- Aminu Bashir Wali
