= Okezie =

- Gender: Male
- Language: Igbo

Origin
- Origin: Nigerian
- Meaning: One has made a fair apportionment
- Region of origin: South-east Nigeria

Okezie // is both an Igbo surname and given name. It means "One has made a fair apportionment" or "One has created perfectly" (a newborn).

== Notable people with the name ==
=== Politicians ===
- Okezie Ikpeazu (born 1964), Nigerian politician
- J. O. J. Okezie, Nigerian politician and doctor

=== Athletes ===
- Chidi Okezie (born 1993), American sprinter
- Joe Okezie (born 1937), Nigerian boxer
- Okozie Alozie (born 1993), American football player
