= Adefuye =

- Gender: Male
- Language: Yoruba

Origin
- Origin: Nigerian
- Meaning: The crown is light
- Region of origin: South West, Nigeria

Adefuye is a Nigerian surname of Yoruba origin, commonly given to males. It means "the crown is light". This distinctive and culturally rich name is often linked to royal families, symbolizing a legacy of dignity and strength.

== Notable individuals with the name ==
- Adebowale Adefuye (1947–2015), Nigerian historian and diplomat
- Toni Tones (born Gbemi Anthonia Adefuye), Nigerian media personality
