= Dick W. Emuchay =

Sir, Dr Dick Waobianyi Emuchay MB ChB MFR

Chairman, Public Service Commission East Central State Nigeria
- In office 1972–1976
- Preceded by: None (position created)
- Succeeded by: None (new states created)

Chairman, Public Service Commission Imo State Nigeria
- In office 1976–1982

Pro-Chancellor and Chairman of the Governing Council Imo State University now Abia State University
- In office 1982–1985
- Governor: Samuel Onunaka Mbakwe

Personal details
- Born: 5 August 1919 Abak, Akwa Ibom State, Nigeria
- Died: 8 May 1995 (aged 75) Azumini, Nigeria
- Spouse: Christiana Nne Alali (m. 1956)
- Education: University of St Andrews
- Profession: Medical Doctor

Dick W. Emuchay (5 August 1919 – 8 May 1995), also referred to as "Sir D. W. Emuchay", was a British-Nigerian medical doctor and administrator. He served as the first chairman of the Public Service Commission of the East Central State. In 1981, Samuel Onunaka Mbakwe, Governor of Imo State, appointed Emuchay as the Pro-Chancellor and Chairman Governing Council of the newly created Imo State University, later Abia State University He served in that position until 1985. He is reputed to have set up the first privately run rural hospital in Nigeria, when in 1961 he set up a 180-bed cottage hospital in his home town of Azumini, in Ukwa East, Abia State.

The first medical doctor from Azumini, Emuchay was unanimously elected the first national chairman of the Azumini Welfare Association during the association's inaugural meeting on 30 December 1958. He also played a role in establishing the National Secondary School, Azumini.

== Early life ==
Emuchay was born in Abak, Akwa Ibom State in eastern Nigeria, and he attended Government College Umuahia, 1932 - 1934 King's College, Lagos, 1935-1936 Higher College, Yaba Lagos 1937-1942 University of St Andrews, Scotland 1945-1949 Liverpool School of Tropical Medicine, England (Diploma in Tropical Medicine and Hygiene). He took his examination in 1953.

== Professional career ==
He taught biology at Igbobi College, Yaba, before proceeding to St. Andrews University Scotland and Liverpool School of Tropical Medicine. He practised medicine briefly in the United Kingdom both as a general practitioner and house Surgeon before relocating back to Nigeria.

- Senior Science Master, Igbobi College, Lagos
- General Medical Practitioner, Lancashire, England, 1949
- House Surgeon, Lancashire, England, 1950
- Senior House Surgeon, Lancashire, England, 1952
- Medical Officer-in-charge of Rural Areas, Aba, 1955-1958
- Medical Officer-in-charge, General Hospital, Degema, Rivers State, 1958-1959
- Medical Officer-in-charge, Maternity Hospital, Aba, 1959-1961

In 1961, D. W. Emuchay became the Proprietor and Medical Superintendent, Cottage Hospital, Azumini which he founded. Years later, his son Dr. Chika O. Emuchay established the Group Medical Practice (GMP) at No. 1 Emuchay Close, Ogbor hill, Aba to provide support to Cottage Hospital, Azumini.

- Chairman, Public Service Commission, East Central State, Enugu, 1972–76
- Chairman, Public Service Commission, former Imo State, Owerri, 1976–82
- Pro-Chancellor and Chairman of the Governing Council, former Imo State University, now Abia State University, Uturu, Nigeria 1982-1985

In 1986, the federal government conferred on him a national honour, the award of Member of the Federal Republic.

== Family ==
D. W. Emuchay married Christiana Nne Alali in 1956 at St Michael and All Angels Anglican Church Aba, Abia State. He is the father of 8 including Chief Dr. Chika Emuchay, a successful physician and former commissioner for Health in Abia State (two times) and Nigerian diplomat and former Consul-General to South Africa, Okey Emuchay, MFR.
