= Christopher Okigbo =

Nigerian poet (1932–1967)

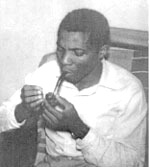
- Born: Christopher Ifekandu Okigbo; 16 August 1932; Ojoto, Anambra State, British Nigeria
- Died: 1967 (aged 34–35); Nsukka, Nigeria
- Education: Government College Umuahia; University College Ibadan
- Occupation: Writer
- Relatives: Pius Okigbo (brother); Bede Okigbo (cousin)
- Writing career
- Genres: Drama, poetry
- Subject: Comparative literature

Christopher Ifekandu Okigbo (16 August 1932 – 1967) was a Nigerian poet, teacher, and librarian, who died fighting for the independence of Biafra. He is widely acknowledged as an outstanding postcolonial English-language African poet and one of the major modernist writers of the 20th century.

== Early life ==
Okigbo was born on 16 August 1932, in the town of Ojoto, about 10 miles (16 km) from the city of Onitsha in Anambra State, located in the southeastern region of Nigeria. His father was a teacher in Catholic missionary schools during the heyday of British colonial rule in Nigeria, and Okigbo spent his early years moving from station to station.

An influential figure in Okigbo's early years was his older brother Pius Okigbo, who would later become the renowned economist and first Nigerian Ambassador to the European Economic Community (EEC). His first cousin was the academic, Bede Okigbo.

== Personal life ==
Despite his father's devout Christianity, Okigbo had an affinity, and came to believe later in his life, that in him was reincarnated the soul of his maternal grandfather, a priest of Idoto, an Igbo deity. Idoto is personified in the river of the same name that flows through Okigbo's village, and the "water goddess" figures prominently in his work. Heavensgate (1962) opens with the lines:

Before you, mother Idoto,

naked I stand,

while in "Distances" (1964), he celebrates his final aesthetic and psychic return to his indigenous religious roots:

I am the sole witness to my homecoming.

== Days at Umuahia and Ibadan ==
Okigbo graduated from Government College Umuahia (in present Abia State, southeastern Nigeria) two years after Chinua Achebe, another noted Nigerian writer, having earned himself a reputation as both a voracious reader and a versatile athlete. The following year, he was accepted to University College in Ibadan (now known as University of Ibadan) in Oyo State, southwestern Nigeria. Originally intending to study medicine, he switched to Classics in his second year. In college, he also earned a reputation as a gifted pianist, accompanying Wole Soyinka in his first public appearance as a singer. It is believed that Okigbo also wrote original music at that time, though none of this has survived.

== Work and art ==
Upon graduating in 1956, he held a succession of jobs in various locations throughout the country, while making his first forays into poetry. He worked at the Nigerian Tobacco Company, United Africa Company, the Fiditi Grammar School (where he taught Latin), and finally as Assistant Librarian at the University of Nigeria in Nsukka, where he helped to found the African Authors Association.

During those years, he began publishing his work in various journals, notably Black Orpheus, a literary journal intended to bring together the best works of African and African-American writers. While his poetry can be read in part as powerful expression of postcolonial African nationalism, he was adamantly opposed to Negritude, which he denounced as a romantic pursuit of the "mystique of blackness" for its own sake; he similarly rejected the conception of a commonality of experience between Africans and black Americans, a stark philosophical contrast to the editorial policy of Black Orpheus. It was on precisely these grounds that he rejected the first prize in African poetry awarded to him at the 1966 World Festival of Negro Arts in Dakar, while declaring that there is no such thing as a Negro or black poet.

In 1963, he left Nsukka to assume the position of West African Representative of Cambridge University Press at Ibadan, a position affording the opportunity to travel frequently to the United Kingdom, where he attracted further attention. At Ibadan, he became an active member of the Mbari literary club, and completed, composed or published the works of his mature years, including Limits (1964), Silences (1962–65), Lament of the Masks (commemorating the centenary of the birth of W. B. Yeats in the forms of a Yoruba praise poem, 1964), Dance of the Painted Maidens (commemorating the 1964 birth of his daughter, Obiageli or Ibrahimat, whom he regarded as a reincarnation of his mother) and his final highly prophetic sequence, Path of Thunder (1965–67), which was published posthumously in 1971 with his magnum opus, Labyrinths, which incorporates the poems from the earlier collections.

== War and death ==
In 1966, the Nigerian crisis came to a head. Okigbo, living in Ibadan at the time, relocated to eastern Nigeria to await the outcome of the turn of events which culminated in the secession of the eastern provinces as independent Biafra on 30 May 1967. Living in Enugu, he worked together with Achebe to establish a new publishing house, Citadel Press.

With the secession of Biafra, Okigbo immediately joined the new state's military as a volunteer, field-commissioned major. An accomplished soldier, he was killed in action during a major push by Nigerian troops in 1967 against Nsukka, the university town where he found his voice as a poet, and which he vowed to defend with his life.

== Legacy ==
In July 1967, his hilltop house at Enugu, where several of his unpublished writings (perhaps including the beginnings of a novel) were, was destroyed in a bombing raid by the Nigerian air force. Also destroyed was Pointed Arches, an autobiography in verse which he describes in a letter to his friend and biographer, Sunday Anozie, as an account of the experiences of life and letters which conspired to sharpen his creative imagination.

Several of his unpublished papers are, however, known to have survived the war. Inherited by his daughter, Obiageli, who established the Christopher Okigbo Foundation in 2005 to perpetuate his legacy, the papers were catalogued in January 2006 by Chukwuma Azuonye, Professor of African Literature at the University of Massachusetts Amherst, Boston, who assisted the foundation in nominating them for the United Nations Educational, Scientific and Cultural Organization (UNESCO) Memory of the World International Register. The Christopher Okigbo Collection, including manuscripts, photographs, travel documents, and transcripts, was added to the register in 2007, recognising it as documentary heritage of global importance.

Azuonye's preliminary studies of the papers indicate that, apart from new poems in English, including drafts of an Anthem for Biafra, Okigbo's unpublished papers include poems written in Igbo language. The Igbo poems are fascinating in that they open up new vistas in the study of Okigbo's poetry, countering the views of some critics, especially the troika (Chinweizu, Onwuchekwa Jemie and Ihechukwu Madubuike) in their 1980 Towards the Decolonization of African Literature, that he sacrificed his indigenous African sensibility in pursuit of obscurantist Euro-modernism.

"Elegy for Alto", the final poem in Path of Thunder, is today widely read as the poet's "last testament" embodying a prophecy of his own death as a sacrificial lamb for human freedom:

Earth, unbind me; let me be the prodigal; let this be
the ram’s ultimate prayer to the tether...

AN OLD STAR departs, leaves us here on the shore
Gazing heavenward for a new star approaching;
The new star appears, foreshadows its going
Before a going and coming that goes on forever....

The Okigbo Award was established by Wole Soyinka in his honor, in 1987. The first winner was Jean-Baptiste Tati Loutard, for La Tradition du Songe (1985).

== Bibliography ==
- Heavensgate (Ibadan: Mbari Publications, 1962)
- Limits (Ibadan: Mbari Publications, 1964)
- Labyrinths with Path of Thunder (London: Heinemann, 1971)
- Collected Poems (London: Heinemann, 1986)

== See also ==
- Pius Okigbo
