= Clark Moore =

American actor and writer

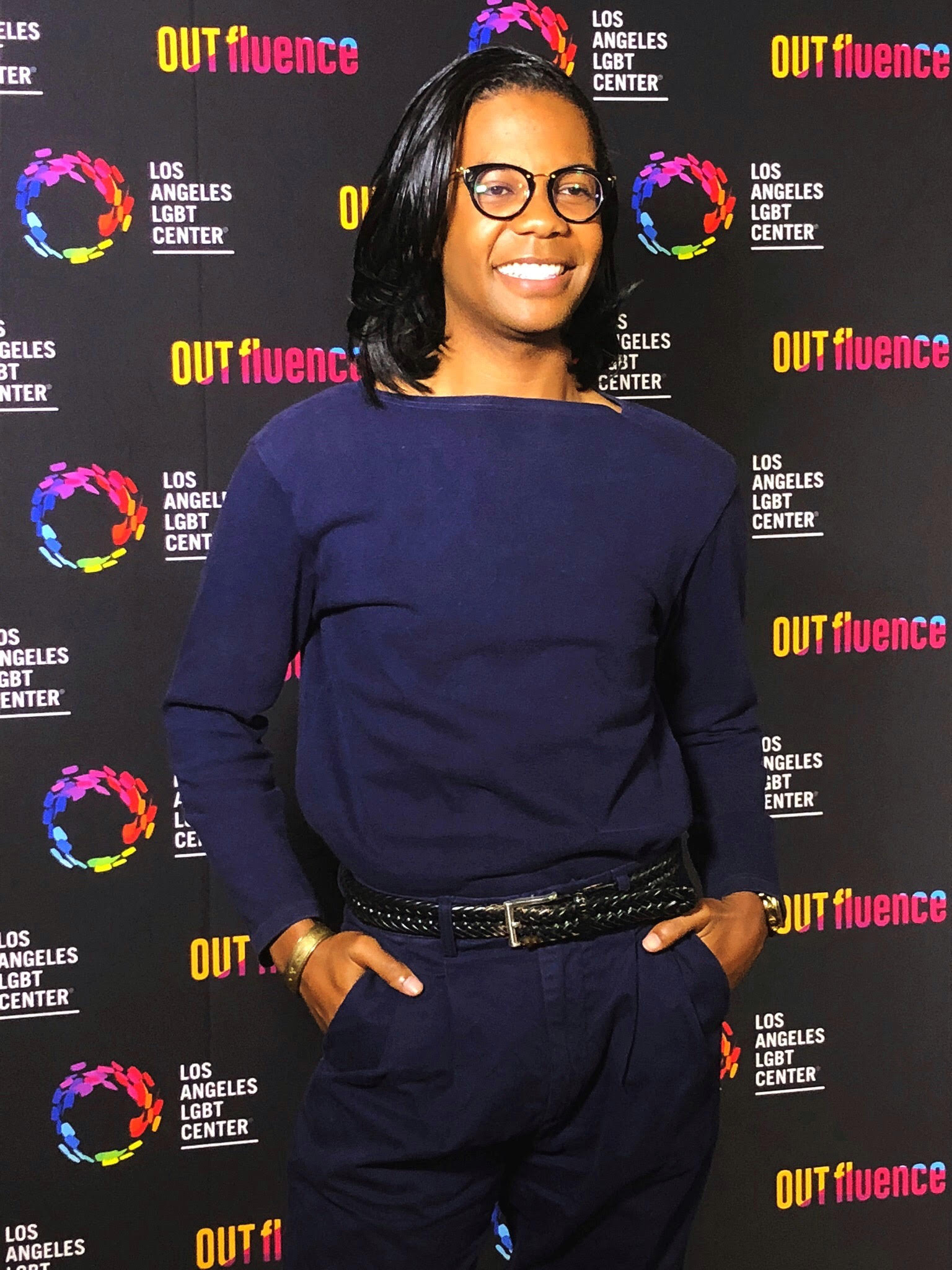
- Born: March 15, 1991 (age 35); Atlanta, Georgia, U.S.
- Education: Dartmouth College (AB)
- Occupations: Actor, Writer
- Years active: 2011-present

Clark Moore (born 1991) is an American actor and writer. He is best known for the role of Ethan in the film Love, Simon and the role of AJ on the final season of Crazy Ex-Girlfriend.

== Early life and education ==
Moore was raised in Atlanta, Georgia. He desired to be an actor from age seven and secured an agent at that time. Moore described his behaviors as feminine growing up and "never having the privilege of passing as straight." Moore listed Brokeback Mountain as one of the only films where he saw gay characters represented when he was growing up. He has spoken about a hierarchy within the gay community that "is also internalized misogyny – that we value masculinity over femininity."

Moore came out to his friends and family as gay when he was in junior high school. He stated that his parents were supportive. Moore described his high school community as very "liberal" and as a result he did not experience bullying after coming out.

Moore received his bachelor's degree from Dartmouth College in 2013 where he was a member of the student acapella group The Dartmouth Aires. In 2011 Moore appeared on the reality singing competition The Sing-Off with the group and they placed second to Pentatonix.

== Career ==
In 2013, Moore appeared on Glee as a member of the Adams Apples on "Sadie Hawkins".

Moore gained wide recognition for his role in the 2018 film Love, Simon. He portrayed Ethan, an out, femme classmate who is bullied for his appearance and sexuality. Moore stated that, like Ethan, he was one of the only openly gay people in his high school and that he advocates for representation of LGBT narratives on screen saying, "The gay experience exists on a spectrum, and everyone's experience, wherever you fall on that spectrum, is valid, and it's important, and it needs to be told." Of his performance, Dazed wrote that his "slight and thoughtful scenes add a nuance to the film that elevates it immeasurably" and that he "steals every scene he's in with perfect one-liners."

He later appeared in co-star Keiynan Lonsdale’s music video for the song “Good Life.”

In October 2018, he joined the cast of the CW's Crazy Ex-Girlfriend for its final season in the role of AJ. Moore appeared in eleven episodes including the live special Yes, It's Really Us Singing: The Crazy Ex-Girlfriend Concert Special!

== Personal life ==
As of 2018, Moore resided in Los Angeles.
