= Waynflete =

Waynflete could refer to:

- William Waynflete (1395–1486), English Lord Chancellor and bishop of Winchester
- Waynflete Professorships at Magdalen College, Oxford, named after William Waynflete
- Waynflete School, a private day school in Portland, Maine, founded in 1898
