= Waynflete School =

Private school in Portland, Maine, US

Coordinates: 43.6463°N 70.2693°W

- Portland, Maine; United States

Information
- Type: Private day school
- Motto: Vincite, Virtute, Vera (Latin); Conquer With True Virtue
- Established: 1897
- Founders: Agnes Lowell and Caroline Crisfield
- Head of school: Geoff Wagg
- Faculty: 144
- Grades: Early childhood education (from age 3) to twelfth grade
- Gender: Coeducational
- Enrollment: 584 total 183 Lower School; 156 Middle School; 245 Upper School
- Average class size: 13 students
- Student to teacher ratio: 9:1
- Schedule: Block scheduling
- Campus: Urban, 3 acre campus 35 acre athletic complex
- Color: Dartmouth Green
- Nickname: Flyers
- Accreditation: New England Association of Schools and Colleges
- Newspaper: The Flyer
- Endowment: US$ 30.5 Million (as of June 30, 2024)
- Website: waynflete.org

Waynflete School is a private, co-educational college preparatory day school established in 1898 for early childhood education (from age three) to the 12th grade. It is located in the West End of Portland, Maine.

== History ==
In 1898, Waynflete School was established by Agnes Lowell and Caroline Crisfield. During a trip to England, they became interested in statesman and educator William Waynflete, after whom the school is named. The school opened with forty-nine students. In the early twentieth century, Waynflete adopted a progressive education model emphasizing physical, social, emotional, and intellectual development through hands-on learning, as championed by philosopher John Dewey. In 1950, boys past the fourth grade were admitted, and in 1967, boys were admitted into the upper school.

== Catchment ==
The Maine Department of Education is responsible for school assignments in unorganized territories, and it pays entities to educate students in unorganized territories. As of 2025, it assigns Perkins Township, Sagadahoc County to Waynflete School as one option. The school is also an option for the Washington community in Franklin County.

== Academics ==
Lower School provides education from early childhood (ages 3 and 4) to fifth grade, with the middle school serving sixth through eighth grades, and upper school serving ninth through twelfth grades. The school has approximately 550 students, with an average classroom size of thirteen students, and a student to teacher ratio of nine to one.

Cocurricular activities such as student government and community service are offered in middle and upper school.

Waynflete School won the state Science Olympiad ten times, most recently in 2024. The Portland Press Herald has called the school a "dynasty" in science competitions.

=== Accreditation ===
Waynflete is accredited by the New England Association of Schools and Colleges (NEASC), and is a member of the National Association of Independent Schools (NAIS), Maine Association of Independent Schools, Independent School Association of Northern New England (ISANNE), Association of Independent Schools of New England (AISNE), and Cum Laude Society.

=== Recognition ===
- Bowdoin College – Abraxas Award, 2005
- Malone Family Foundation – Malone Scholar School, 2011
- Down East Magazine – Readers' Choice Private School, 2011

== Campus ==
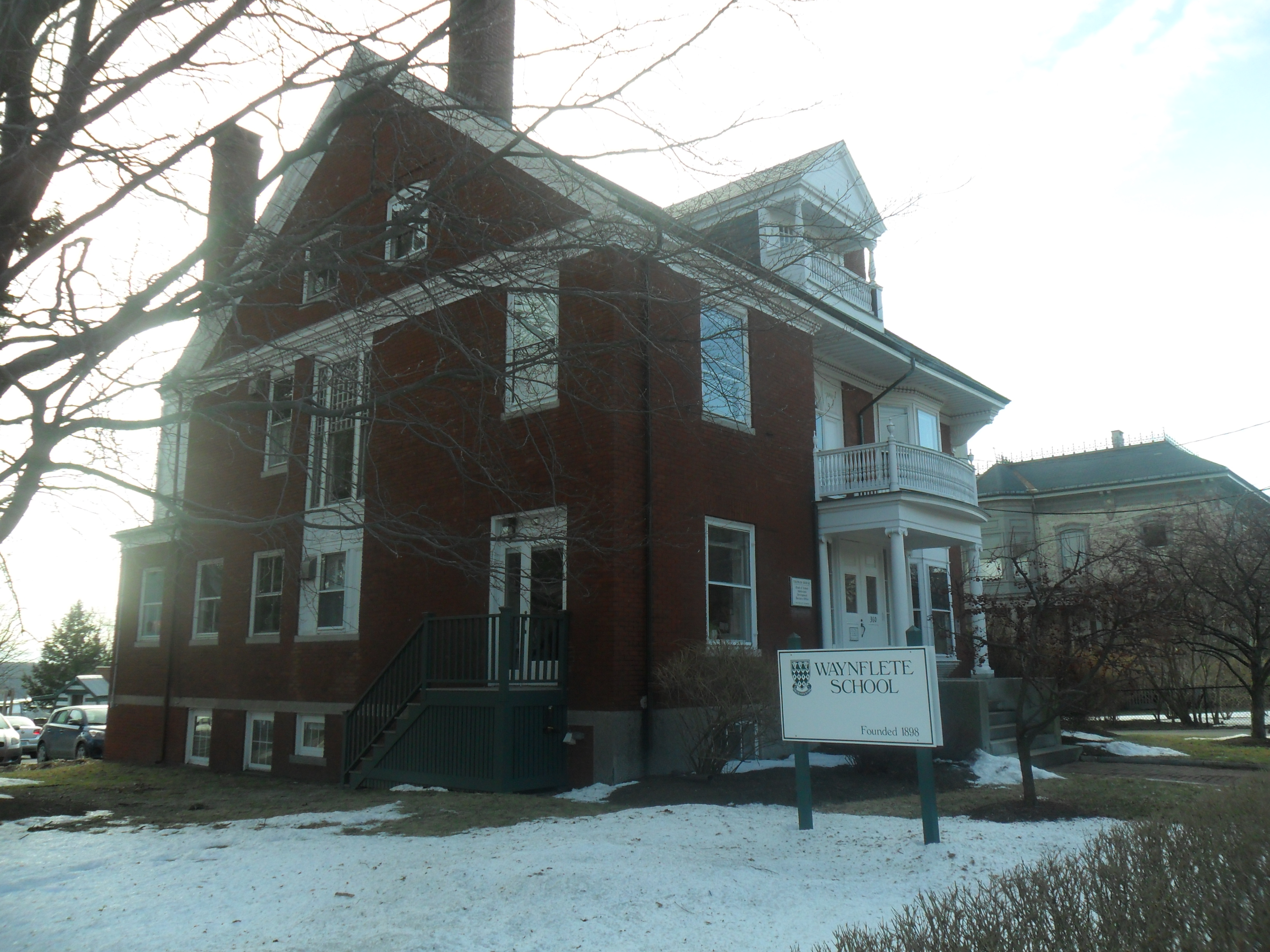
Waynflete's Thomas House

Waynflete has a three-acre campus made up of historic homes modified for school use, as well as newly constructed buildings. The campus consists of eleven buildings, which include: Boulos House, Hurd House, Sills Hall, Hewes Hall, Founders Hall, Morrill House, Cook-Hyde House, Thomas House, Davis Hall, Emery Building, Upper School Science Center, LEED Silver certified Arts Center designed by Scott Simons Architects consisting of a 276-seat theater and exhibition gallery, two gymnasiums, and two school-owned housing units, one used for the residence of the headmaster, and the other not currently used for educational purposes. Waynflete also has a thirty-five-acre off-campus scenic athletic complex named Fore River Fields.

== Athletics ==
Lower school students participate in physical education. Middle school students participate in competitive sports or non-competitive activities. Upper school offers competitive sports at the junior varsity and varsity level, as well as physical education options and an independent physical activity program.

Waynflete competes in the Western Maine Conference and is a member of Maine Principals' Association (MPA). The school athletic teams are called Flyers, with the school colors being green and white. Waynflete is a rival to North Yarmouth Academy.

== Tuition ==
Tuition for the 2023–2024 academic year ranges from $30,690 for kindergarten and Grade 1, to $38,205 for Grade 12.

== Notable alumni ==
- Amy Allen (2010), first woman to win a Grammy Award for Songwriter of the Year (Non-Classical)
- Susannah Beck (1986), distance runner
- Christopher Fitzgerald (1991), actor
- Linda Lavin, actress
- Nicole Maines (2015), transgender activist and actress
- Judd Nelson, actor
- Michael Odokara-Okigbo (2008), member of the Dartmouth Aires
- Jane Spencer (1994), writer
- Liv Tyler (transferred out), actress

== See also ==
- Education in Maine

Other private high schools in Maine which take students with public funds (from unorganized areas and/or with agreements with school districts):

- Foxcroft Academy
- Lee Academy
- George Stevens Academy
- Washington Academy

Connecticut private academies acting as public high schools:

- Gilbert School
- Norwich Free Academy
- Woodstock Academy

New Hampshire private academies acting as public high schools:

- Coe-Brown Northwood Academy
- Pinkerton Academy
