= Victor Mukete =

Cameroonian politician (1918–2021)

Victor Mukete (15 November 1918 – 10 April 2021) was a traditional Chief in Cameroon. He was a minister of Information in Nigeria before the reunification of Southern Cameroons with former French Cameroon from 1958 to 1959.

He was also a Senator.

== Personal life ==
Nfon Victor Esemingsongo Mukete was born on November 15, 1918, in Kumba. He married Hannah Ntoh Makia Mukete in 1953. Nfon Mukete had seven sons: Abel Mukete, Ekale Mukete, Colin Ebako Mukete, Mbe Mukete, Diko Mukete, Akwo Mukete and Ekoko Mukete.

He was the father of businessman Colin Ebarko Mukete.

Mukete died on 10 April 2021 at the age of 102, at the Yaounde Central Hospital after a prolonged illness.

== Education ==
Nfon Mukete was educated at Government School Kumba, 1926–32 and then proceeded to the prestigious Government College Umuahia, on a government scholarship for his secondary school studies from 1933 to 1938. In 1939, after Government College Umuahia, he proceeded to Higher College Yaba. Most of the students that went to Government College Umuahia went on to Yaba College which was the only science-based institution of higher learning at the time. He also attended University of Manchester, England, 1948–51 and Christ's College, Cambridge University from 1951 to 1952.

He was an agriculturist and botanist by training.

== Traditional Chief ==
Nfon VE Mukete was the supreme leader of the Bafaw. He sat at the Nfon palace in Kumba.

He was the author of a book, My Odyssey: History of the reunification of Cameroon.

== Politics ==
Nfon Victor Mukete was Nigerian Federal Minister without Portfolio in 1955 and then Minister of Research and Information from 1958 to 1959. This was the last political post he held in Nigeria before Southern Cameroon joined what became the Republic of Cameroon in October 1961.

His political stature continued to grow in a unified Cameroon. First he became Chairman of the Cameroon Development Corporation (CDC) from 1960 – 1982; and was sworn into the Cameroon National Assembly as a Judge of the Court of Impeachment. He later became a Member of the Economic and Social Council; Vice President of the Cameroon Chamber of Commerce, Mines, Industry and Crafts and is now its Honorary President.

Chief Mukete was the doyen d’age of the Cameroon Senate (oldest member of the Cameroonian Senate) and he remained just as influential in Cameroon at the age of 100 just as he was in Nigeria in the Pre-Independence Era.

== Books ==
My Odyssey: The Story of Cameroon Reunification With Authentic Letters Of Key Players. Yaounde, Cameroon : Eagle Publishing, [2013]
