= Mofia Tonjo Akobo =

Nigerian politician and activist (1934–2020)

Minister of Petroleum Resources
- In office July 1975 – March 1976
- Succeeded by: General Muhammadu Buhari

Personal details
- Born: July 1934 Abonnema Nigeria
- Died: 12 March 2020 Port Harcourt, Nigeria
- Occupation: Medical doctor; politician; activist

Chief Mofia Tonjo Akobo (July 1934 – March 2020) was a Nigerian politician and his major campaigns were on environmental and resource control issues. He was the first Minister of Petroleum Resources in the Federal government of Nigeria. He was trained as a medical doctor and a soldier and was deployed in the Nigerian Civil War (1967-1970). As the first Minister of Petroleum, it made him a key figure in developing the economy after the war, unfortunately still heavily reliant on oil.

Akobo became the Chairman of the Southern Minorities Movement and coordinated the formation of the Union of Niger Delta.

== Early life and education ==
He was born July 1934 in Abonnema into the family of Mary John Fyneface of Abonnema and Nathaniel Tonjo Akobo of Tombia. His primary education includes studying at the Bishop Crowther Memorial School Abonnema, Central school Eha-Amufu, and Tombia School, Tombia. His secondary education was at the Government College Umuahia, from 1949 to 1955 where he became the School's Captain (1954/1955). His Tertiary Education was acquired at the University College Ibadan, from 1956 to 1960. He also attended the University College hospital, from 1960 to 1963, and carried out his medical internship at the Lagos University Teaching Hospital, from 1963 to 1964.

In 1955, he was awarded the Elder Demster Lines of Unilever Brothers Group scholarship to the United Kingdom for a three-week educational tour to London, Liverpool, Brighton, and North Wales; this gave him his first experience of western civilization.

== Family ==
He was married to Data Ine Akobo, née Amachree, a retired deputy librarian of the Rivers State University of Science and Technology, and has children and grandchildren.

== Career ==
He worked at the Royal Orthopedic Hospital Igbobi Yaba, the General Hospital Marina, Lagos, the Federal Airport Medical Unit Kano, the Five Battalions MRS Kano from 1964 to 1966, the General Hospital Yenegoa, Eastern Nigeria from 1966 to 1968, the General Hospital Aba, from April 1968-August 1968 and the 3rd Nigerian Army Medical Corps, from September 1968-January 1970.

== Politics ==
In August 1969, he became the chairman, of Rivers State Sports Council and a Member of Nigeria National Sports Commission, from April 1972 – August 1973. He was Commissioner for Works and later Commissioner for Finance in the Rivers State Executive Council between 1973 and 1974. In 1967–1969, he was part of the Third Army commanded by Benjamin Adekunle.

In 1975, he was appointed into the Federal Cabinet as the first minister in charge of the newly created Petroleum and Energy Ministry. In December 1975, as OPEC minister in Vienna, Akobo was part of the ministers held during the Carlos terrorist hijack. He served on General Murtala Mohammed's executive council and was retained by the new head of state General Olusegun Obasanjo but reassigned to the portfolio of economic planning and development until 1977.

He concluded signing the contract of the Warri refinery and greatly advanced the development of the Kaduna refinery. He was involved in the establishment of the ECOWAS at the ministerial level and the establishment of the Niger Delta Basin Development Authority.

In 1978, he returned to Port Harcourt to head the group of Medical practice of TEME Clinic Association in Port-Harcourt established by him alongside co-directors, George Organ and Peterside.

With a keen interest in the development of the Niger Delta region, Akobo got involved in the establishment of the IZON National Congress where he was a founding member (1991/92). He was also a founding member of the Movement for National Reformation under the chairmanship of Chief Anthony Enahoro CFR, and the Southern Minorities Movement headed by General David Ejoor. Akobo eventually became Chairman of the Southern Minorities Movement, and coordinated the formation of the Union of Niger Delta, which was a coalition of movement of Niger Delta region, like the Southern Minorities Movement, the Commonwealth of the Niger Delta Coalition, MOSOP and several other ethnic minority movements in the region.

His other involvements as an activist include:

- Founder and elder council member of the Ijaw National Council.
- Founding member of the Southern Minority Movement.
- Executive member of the Movement for National Reformation headed by Chief Anthony Enahoro and supported by Alfred Rewane.
- Founding member of the Rivers State study group.
- Founding member of the Ijaw Youth Council (IYC).
- Executive member of the Centre for Constitutional Governance (CCG) headed by Beko Ransome-Kuti.
- Founding member of NADECO (National Democratic Coalition).
- Executive delegate member of G34, fractions of which transformed themselves into the PDP (Peoples Democratic Party).

== Death ==
Akobo died on 13 March 2020 after a brief illness and was laid to rest on Saturday, 10 October 2020, at his hometown in Tombia, Degema Local Government Area Of Rivers State.
