= University of Rochester YellowJackets =

Male collegiate a capella group based in Rochester, NY

The YellowJackets
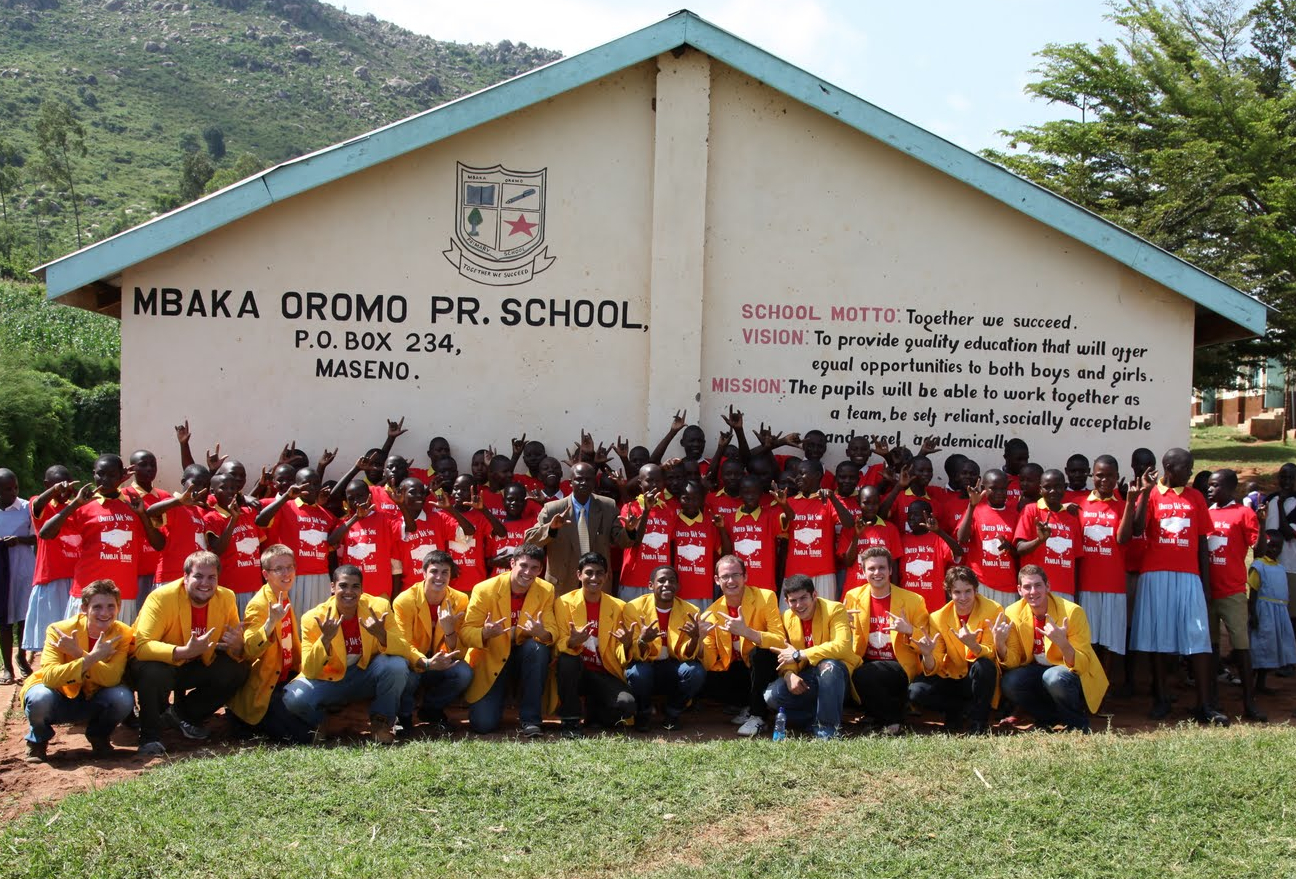
- The University of Rochester YellowJackets pose with students from Mbaka Oromo Primary School, Nyanza Province, Kenya on their United We Sing tour in June 2011
- Formation: 1956
- Type: All-male contemporary a cappella group
- Location: University of Rochester
- Founder: Dr. Ward Woodbury, Jr.
- Website: www.jackets.org

The University of Rochester YellowJackets (YellowJackets) are an all-male collegiate a cappella group based in Rochester, New York. As the University of Rochester's oldest a cappella group, The YellowJackets frequently perform for campus functions in addition to their performance schedule around Rochester and the northeastern part of the United States. The group's members are students from the University's River Campus and Eastman School of Music. On September 19, 2011 the group made their national primetime television debut to an audience of 5.3 million viewers as contestants on Season 3 of NBC's "The Sing-Off", ultimately finishing in 7th place (out of 16 finalist groups.) The group celebrated their 60th anniversary in October 2016 during the University of Rochester's annual Meliora Weekend celebration, with plans for a 70th anniversary during Meliora Weekend in 2026.

== History ==
The YellowJackets were founded in 1956 by Dr. Ward Woodbury, Jr., Director of Music for the University's River Campus, as a subset of the Men's Glee Club on campus. Performing for the first time at the Commencement ceremonies in May 1956, the group began to establish itself on campus. The initial members of the YellowJackets were also members of the Glee Club, and the group sang their tunes to piano accompaniment.

Continuing in this style through the 1970s, in 1981 the group began moving away from the use of piano and into the style of a cappella music. In the late 1980s the group introduced vocal percussion into their music and it has remained a key part of the signature YellowJacket sound to this day. Throughout the years the YellowJackets have strived for a professional and polished sound that audiences will remember long after they hear the group in concert.

=== Performance attire ===
While the group is traditionally known for wearing their signature yellow blazers, the original group wore blue blazers with black and red ties until 1958 when they purchased their namesake attire. Along with the new yellow jackets, the men wore tux pants and bow ties and created the look that clearly identifies the YellowJackets today. The uniform changed in the 1980s due to ever evolving fashion trends, returning to a blue tie, and then bringing back the ever-popular YellowJackets for good. The current group has two distinct looks that they use for performances. The "Alumni" attire, a tribute to the first groups of YellowJackets, consists of the yellow jacket, black dress pants and shirts, black long ties, and black dress shoes. The group's second attire option consists of a sportier yellow jacket, black jeans, white sneakers, and a matching group T-shirt. While on NBC's "The Sing-Off", group members sported outfits professionally created by Kara Saun, the show's Costume Designer. The group wore a different outfit for each of their 7 performances, including original costumes from the movie Starship Troopers for the Halloween Episode opening number.

== The YellowJackets on The Sing-Off ==
The YellowJackets appeared on Season 3 of NBC's a cappella reality show The Sing-Off. Expanded from its smaller holiday season format, Season 3 of the show saw 16 groups from across the United States competing for a top prize of $200,000 and a Sony Music Recording Contract. The group arrived in Los Angeles, California on July 20, 2011 to begin filming the show. Filming of The Sing-Off took place at Sony Pictures Studios in Culver City, a suburb of Los Angeles. While en route to LA, the group met fellow contestants Afro-Blue in Chicago's O'Hare International Airport and made the connection that they were soon going to be appearing on the same television show. Episodes of the show were pre-taped in front of a live studio audience. The YellowJackets were consistently supported by a large, passionate fan base made up of family members, friends, and local supporters of the group at the tapings of the show.

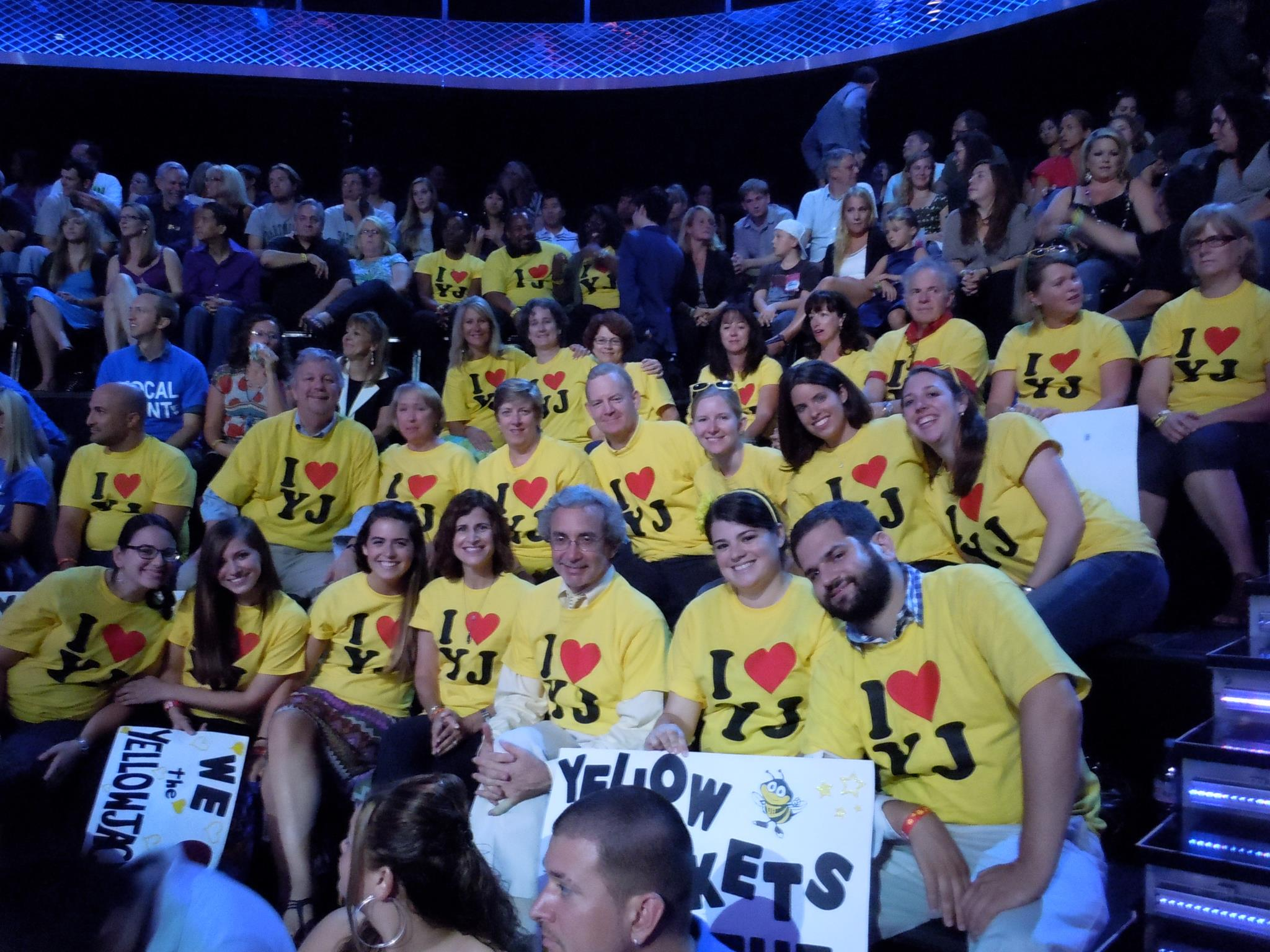
Devoted YellowJackets fans wearing their "I Heart YJ" T-shirts at a taping of The Sing-Off

=== Performances ===
While on Season 3 of The Sing-Off, The YellowJackets performed 8 individual numbers and 5 all-group "opening" numbers.

Episode number	Episode air date	Song title	Original artist	Video link
Episode 1 - Opening Number	September 19, 2011	"Perfect"	Pink	"Perfect" performed by Season 3 Bracket A Contestants
**Episode 1 - Signature Song**	September 19, 2011	"Wavin' Flag"	K'naan	"Wavin' Flag" performed by The YellowJackets
Episode 3 - Opening Number	October 3, 2011	"Somewhere Only We Know"	Keane	"Somewhere Only We Know" performed by Top 6 Season 3 Bracket A Contestants
**Episode 3 - Current Hit**	October 3, 2011	"Dynamite"	Taio Cruz	"Dynamite" performed by The YellowJackets
**Episode 3 - 1960s Hit**	October 3, 2011	"Can't Take My Eyes Off You"	Frankie Valli	"Can't Take My Eyes Off You" performed by The YellowJackets
Episode 5 - Opening Number	October 17, 2011	"All Night Long"	Lionel Richie	"All Night Long" performed by Top 10 Season 3 Contestants
**Episode 5 - Guilty Pleasure Song**	October 17, 2011	"Wannabe"	Spice Girls	"Wannbe" performed by The YellowJackets
Episode 6 - Opening Number	October 24, 2011	"Nothin' on You"	B.o.B feat. Bruno Mars	"Nothin' on You" performed by Top 8 Season 3 Contestants
**Episode 6 - Hip-Hop Song**	October 24, 2011	"The Show Goes On"	Lupe Fiasco	"The Show Goes On" performed by The YellowJackets
**Episode 6 - Sing-Off Battle Song**	October 24, 2011	"Just a Dream"	Nelly	"Just a Dream" performed by The YellowJackets
Episode 7 - Opening Number	October 31, 2011	Halloween Medley: "This Is Halloween" by Danny Elfman, "Werewolves of London" by Warren Zevon, and "Ghostbusters" by Ray Parker Jr.	Various Artists	"Halloween Medley" performed by Top 7 Season 3 Contestants
**Episode 7 - Superstar Medley**	October 31, 2011	"The River of Dreams"/"She's Always a Woman"/"Uptown Girl"	Billy Joel	"Billy Joel Medley" performed by The YellowJackets
**Episode 7 - Swan Song**	October 31, 2011	"Tubthumping"	Chumbawamba	"Tubthumping" performed by The YellowJackets

- A "**bolded episode number**" indicates an individual YellowJackets performance and an "italicized episode number" indicates an all-group opening number.
- The YellowJackets performed head to head against The Collective at the end of Episode 6. Per the week's competition rules, both groups sang their own versions of Nelly's song "Just a Dream". The judges were forced to decide which group won the "sing off" by a vote on-air. In the end The YellowJackets prevailed on a 2-1 vote with votes from judges Shawn Stockman and Sara Bareilles.
- The YellowJackets were eliminated from the competition on Episode 7. The group performed Chumbawamba's hit song "Tubthumping" for their "swan song". Reaction to the performance following the episode was largely positive, including Grady Smith, of EW.com's PopWatch, asking if the performance was "The best swan song ever?"

== United We Sing ==
As mentioned on Episode 1 of "The Sing-Off", The YellowJackets spent the first part of their 2011 summer in Kenya working on a musical exchange with students from Mbaka Oromo Primary School near the town of Maseno in Nyanza Province, Western Kenya. The YellowJackets travelled to Kenya to exchange American and Kenyan music and culture, as well as to film an upcoming documentary entitled "United We Sing", directed and edited by Rochester filmmaker Dan Petracca and produced by YellowJackets Aaron Sperber (Class of 2011) and Ross Pedersen (Class of 2013), that details the power of music in life and in education. Additionally while in Kenya, the group recorded part of the entirely a cappella soundtrack, produced by Layne Stein of Rayne's Room Studio, for the documentary, which features The YellowJackets and several Mbaka Oromo students.

Mbaka Oromo Primary School is known for the success of its school choir at the national level competitions in Kenya where they have won several times. Previously, the school's choir was supported by a Rochester teacher, Mr. James Nowak, and monetary donations that he secured to send the choir to the national competition each year. Tragially, Nowak was killed in a car accident in Kenya in January 2011.

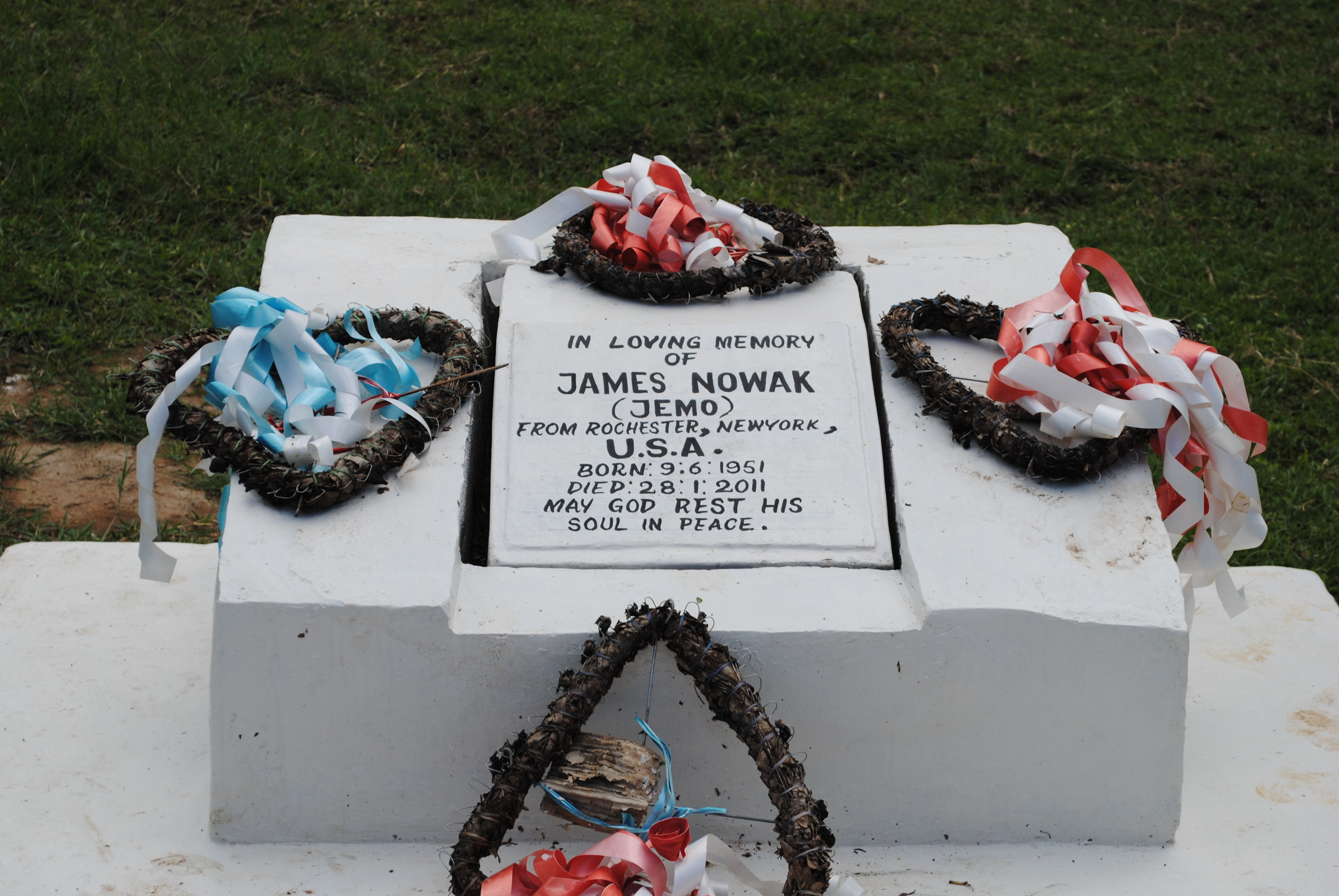
Memorial to Mr. James Nowak on the grounds of Mbaka Oromo Primary School, Nyanza Province, Western Kenya

. Through donations from fans, supporters, and group members, The YellowJackets were able to raise enough money to send the choir back to the national competition in 2011, where they won the top prize. Using "United We Sing", benefit concerts put on by the group, and an ongoing fundraising campaign through their website, The YellowJackets are working to raise funds to support the choir for the years to come.

Release of the documentary and soundtrack album is expected in late 2012 or 2013.

=== United We Sing benefit concerts ===
The group has held three major benefit concerts in Rochester to support the United We Sing project. Each concert featured special guest groups from "The Sing-Off" and sold out the venue where the concerts were being held.

Concert date	Venue	Special guest groups and attendees	Attendance
March 26, 2011	Strong Auditorium (on the University of Rochester's River Campus)	NOTA, winners of Season 1. Kenya's Ambassador to the United States, Mr. Elkanah Odembo, along with his family, and University of Rochester President Joel Seligman also were special guests at the concert. Seligman greeted the sold-out crowd and Ambassador Odembo spoke during the middle of the concert, urging concert-goers to support the group's cause in Kenya.	1,031 (Sold Out)
December 11, 2011	Kodak Hall at Eastman Theatre	Pentatonix (winners of Season 3), Delilah (fan favorites from Season 3), and "The Buzz", a middle school a cappella group from Rochester City School District's World of Inquiry School, started by YellowJacket Aaron Sperber (Class of 2011).	4,652 (Combined attendance for two sold-out concerts)

The YellowJackets held back-to-back concerts (3 PM and 7 PM) on December 11, 2011 to accommodate the overwhelming public response for tickets. The first show was sold out in 4 days and the second show sold out in a matter of hours. The concerts received considerable coverage from local media entities, specifically NBC 10, 13 WHAM ABC, The Democrat and Chronicle, Legends 102.7, WARM 101.3, and the University of Rochester's Office of Communications.

== The YellowJackets and "The Buzz" ==
In the fall of 2011, outgoing YellowJackets Musical Director Aaron Sperber (Class of 2011) created "The Buzz", an a cappella group at the Rochester City School District's World of Inquiry School. Aaron created the group as part of his Kauffman Entrepreneurial Year (KEY) program through the University of Rochester. The KEY Scholarship program is a tuition free, 5th year where highly qualified University of Rochester students design and implement a unique entrepreneurial project aimed at impacting the campus or Rochester community. In partnership with school administrators, World of Inquiry School Music Teacher Bridget Maio, and current members of the YellowJackets, "The Buzz" began to develop a repertoire of their own. The group made their debut performance onstage with The YellowJackets at the first of two sold-out concerts at Rochester's Kodak Hall at Eastman Theatre in December 2011, and they have continued to sing, recently performing their own shows around the city.

Upon returning home from "The Sing-Off", The YellowJackets were contacted by Maio who asked the group to come and spend a little bit of time working with her students. The group agreed and Sperber turned it into something more. Members of The YellowJackets, led by Sperber, worked with the nearly 100 members of "The Buzz" weekly throughout the fall semester, helping them develop their voices and teaching them some of their hit songs from the show. The choir continues to be a local example of The YellowJackets' belief that music has an incredible, uniting purpose in education and society.

== Awards and honors ==
Throughout the years The YellowJackets have been the recipients of several local and national awards and honors.

=== "Key to the City" ===
The YellowJackets were awarded the "Key to the City" by Rochester Mayor Thomas Richards on December 9, 2011 during a ceremony in Hirst Lounge on the University of Rochester's River Campus. The award came primarily as recognition for the group's work with "The Buzz", a student a cappella group founded at the Rochester City School District's World of Inquiry School by YellowJacket Aaron Sperber (Class of 2011), but also for their contributions to the musical community in the City of Rochester and for representing the city and surrounding area during their performances on "The Sing-Off".

=== Musical Honors ===
Year	Award	Presented by:
2026	Contemporary A Cappella Recording Award (CARA) - "Best Rock Song" for "Burn" from Ignis	Contemporary A Cappella Society
2017	Contemporary A Cappella Recording Award (CARA) - "Best Male Collegiate Album" for Y2J	Contemporary A Cappella Society
2017	Contemporary A Cappella Recording Award (CARA) - "Best Male Collegiate Arrangement" for Trap Queen arranged by Cordero ('15) on Y2J	Contemporary A Cappella Society
2014	Contemporary A Cappella Recording Award Nomination (CARA) - "Best Male Collegiate Arrangement" for If I Lose Myself arranged by Matt Carlin ('14) on Fifty Shades of Yellow	Contemporary A Cappella Society
2014	Contemporary A Cappella Recording Award Nomination (CARA) - "Best Scholastic Original Song" for Pretty Girl by Abhishek Sharma ('14) on Fifty Shades of Yellow	Contemporary A Cappella Society
2013	Voices Only 2013 Vol. 1 - "Waka Waka (This Time for Africa)" on United We Sing	Voices Only A Cappella
2013	Contemporary A Cappella Recording Award Nomination (CARA) - "Best Religious Song" for I Smile feat. Trey McLaughlin on United We Sing	Contemporary A Cappella Society
2011	Contemporary A Cappella Recording Award Nomination (CARA) - "Best Male Collegiate Album" for Bad Bromance	Contemporary A Cappella Society
2001	"Best of College A Cappella 2001" - "Now and Forever" from Common Time	Varsity Vocals
2000	"Picks of 2000" Honorable Mention - Common Time	Recorded A Cappella Review Board (RARB)

=== University Honors ===
The YellowJackets were recipients of the "Boar's Head Award" in 2009. The award is presented annually to a campus student group in recognition of "Outstanding Contributions to the University of Rochester Community". The presentation takes place at the Boars Head Dinner held in Douglass Dining Center on the University of Rochester's River Campus. The dinner is one of the longest running University traditions, dating back to 1934.

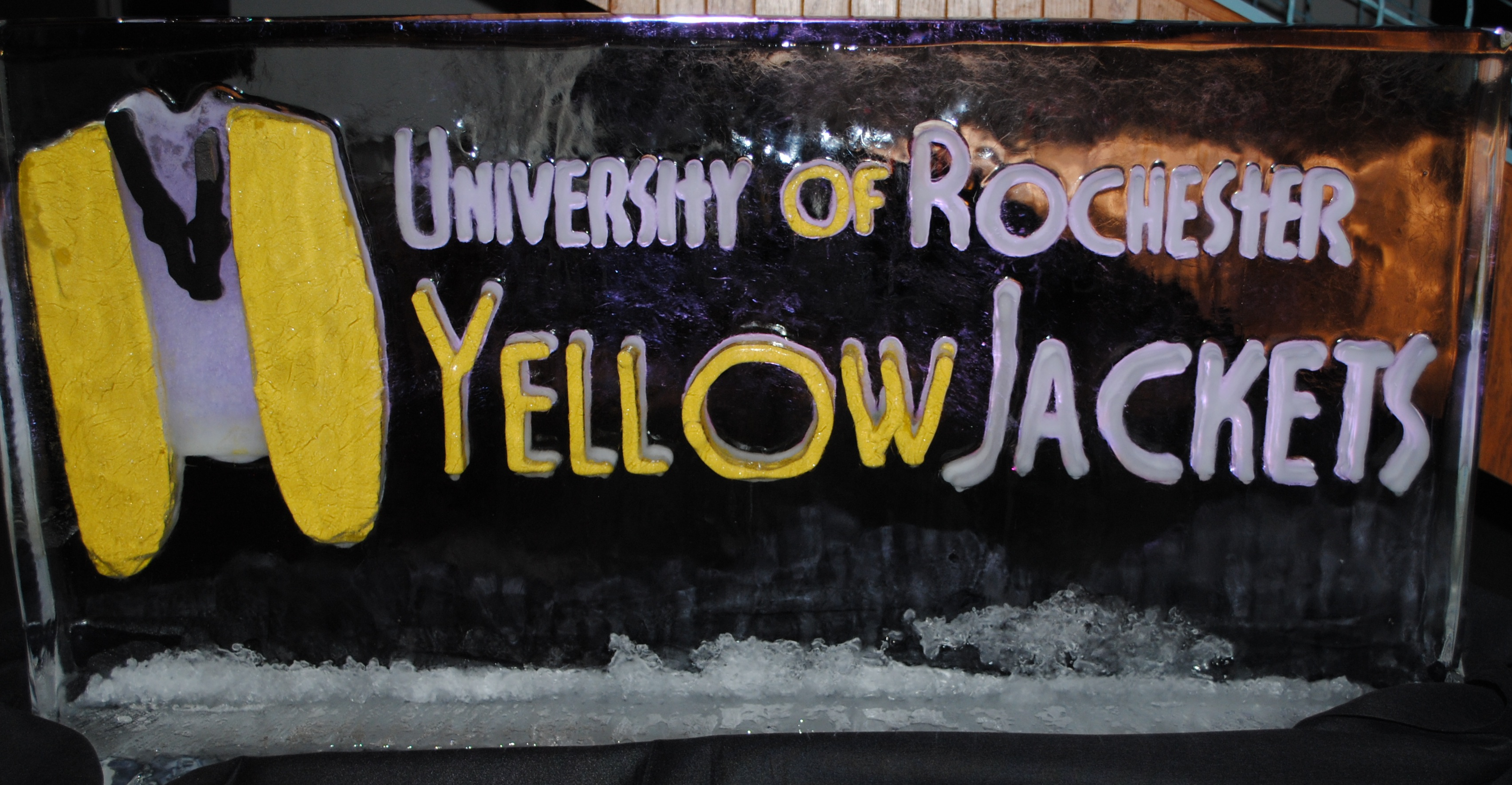
At the next year's dinner, the previous year's winner of the "Boar's Head Award" is honored with an ice carving. This carving was to honor The YellowJackets (2009 "Boar's Head Award" Winners)

The YellowJackets were nominated for and presented with the honor by the previous year's recipient, The Campus Times, the University's student newspaper organization. In turn, The YellowJackets presented the award to S.A.L.S.I.T.A, the Spanish and Latino Students' Association of the University of Rochester, in 2010.

=== Other Honors ===
On December 16, 2011, The YellowJackets were named one of the "Top 10 American Collegiate A Cappella Groups of 2011" by the A Cappella Blog.

On February 4, 2013, college search resource website Schools.com named The YellowJackets one of "10 Must-Hear College A Cappella Groups".
