= The Dartmouth Aires =

American college a cappella group

- Origin: Hanover, New Hampshire
- Genre: Collegiate a cappella
- Years active: 1946–present
- Website: www.dartmouthaires.com

The Dartmouth Aires is an Ivy League a cappella group from Dartmouth College in Hanover, New Hampshire. The group rose to fame in the third season of the NBC musical competition The Sing-Off, placing runner-up behind international a cappella sensation Pentatonix.

== History ==
Dartmouth College's oldest a cappella singing group, the Aires were originally formed as the Injunaires in 1946 as an octet offshoot of the college Glee Club. The group shortened its name in 1972 ahead of the College's 1974 removal of the Indian mascot; a few years later the Aires became independent of the Glee Club.

Although the Aires usually have around eighteen members, group numbers vary on a term-to-term basis. Auditions are held at the beginning of every fall term. Upon joining, each member receives a nickname consisting of two syllables and ending in "o." Members of the Aires pick songs to arrange based on the group's tastes, singing a variety of styles as a result. According to their website, the group's repertoire features "a wide mix of contemporary favorites, traditional Ivy League tunes, sketch comedy, and the occasional piece of opera."

Most of the group's arrangements consist of a soloist, background singers, and a vocal percussionist. The Aires perform at numerous events each term at Dartmouth and locally in the Upper Valley. They frequently take weekend road-trips, singing and reveling at other colleges, performing for schools and private events, and entertaining at Dartmouth alumni clubs. Every winter break, the Aires tour the Eastern Seaboard, while traveling further afield every spring. Recent spring tours have taken them to Aruba, Costa Rica, Paris, Italy, Colorado, a few of the Hawaiian Islands, Florida, California, and Hong Kong.

Recent Aires accolades include winning the Contemporary A Cappella Recording Award (CARA) for Best All-Male Collegiate Album for both their 2003 ("Black Tie Affaire") and 2005 ("Impaired") album releases, as well as selection for Varsity Vocals' Best Of Collegiate A Cappella compilation albums in 2003, 2005, 2008, 2012, 2015, and 2021 and selection for the Voices Only compilation CD in 2005, 2006, 2008, and 2011.

In 2011, they competed in season 3 of The Sing Off, a national reality show. The group performing on the show included 16 Aires from the classes of 2010 through 2014. Out of 16 original contestants, they finished as first runner-up behind Pentatonix, whose rise to stardom was catalyzed by the show.

== The Sing-Off Performances ==
The Dartmouth Aires made the following performances. Note that they did not perform in Episodes 1 and 3:

- Episode 2: Signature Songs
  - Higher Ground by Stevie Wonder
- Episode 4: Current Hits and 1960s Favorites
  - Animal by Neon Trees
  - Pinball Wizard by The Who
- Episode 5: Guilty Pleasures
  - Jessie's Girl by Rick Springfield
- Episode 6: Hip Hop
  - Club Can't Handle Me by Flo Rida
- Episode 7: Superstar Medleys
  - Killer Queen, Bohemian Rhapsody and Somebody to Love by Queen
- Episode 8: Rock and Country
  - We're Not Gonna Take It by Twisted Sister
  - Save a Horse, Ride a Cowboy by Big & Rich
- Episode 9: R&B
  - Ignition (Remix) by R. Kelly
  - Midnight Train to Georgia by Gladys Knight & the Pips
- Episode 10: Mastermix Medleys and Judges' Choice
  - Sympathy for the Devil by The Rolling Stones/Born This Way by Lady Gaga
  - Shout by The Isley Brothers
  - Won in a "Sing Off Battle" with Afro Blue where they sang "Somebody to Love" by Queen
- Episode 11: Live Finale
  - Paradise by the Dashboard Light by Meat Loaf (with Amy Whitcomb of Delilah)
  - Not the Same by Ben Folds (with Judge Ben Folds)
  - Somewhere from West Side Story (swan song)

== Albums ==
- Self-Awaire (2026)
- Luminaire (2023)
- On Aire (2017)
- Truth or Daire (2014)
- Fresh Aire (2011)
- Extraordinaire (2008)
- Impaired (2004)
- Dartmouth Undying (2002)
- Black Tie Affaire (2002)
- Numerous older albums and records (1950-1990s)

== Notable alumni ==
- Thomas S. Marvel (1956), architect behind American embassies in Costa Rica and Guatemala, among other public buildings
- Mahlon "Sandy" Apgar (1962), housing, infrastructure, and real estate consultant
- David Carroll (1972), Tony-winning actor known for leading roles in original Broadway runs of Grand Hotel and Chess
- Paul "Lazo" Lazarus (1976), director, producer and writer of film, television, and theatre
- Jonathon E. Stewart (1996), screenwriter known for Cars 3, Smallfoot, and Scoob!
- Marc "Dojo" Bruni (1999), Tony-, Grammy-, and Olivier-winning director of Beautiful: The Carole King Musical
- Eli "Gonzo" Jorné (2002), television writer and producer, known for The Walking Dead and Severance
- Michael "Nemo" Odokara-Okigbo (2012), musician and philanthropist
- Clark "Gelo" Moore (2013), actor and writer
- Danny "Elmo" Freeman (2013), CNN correspondent
