= Obi Nwakanma =

Nigerian writer, critic and academic (born 1966)

Professor Obi Nwakanma
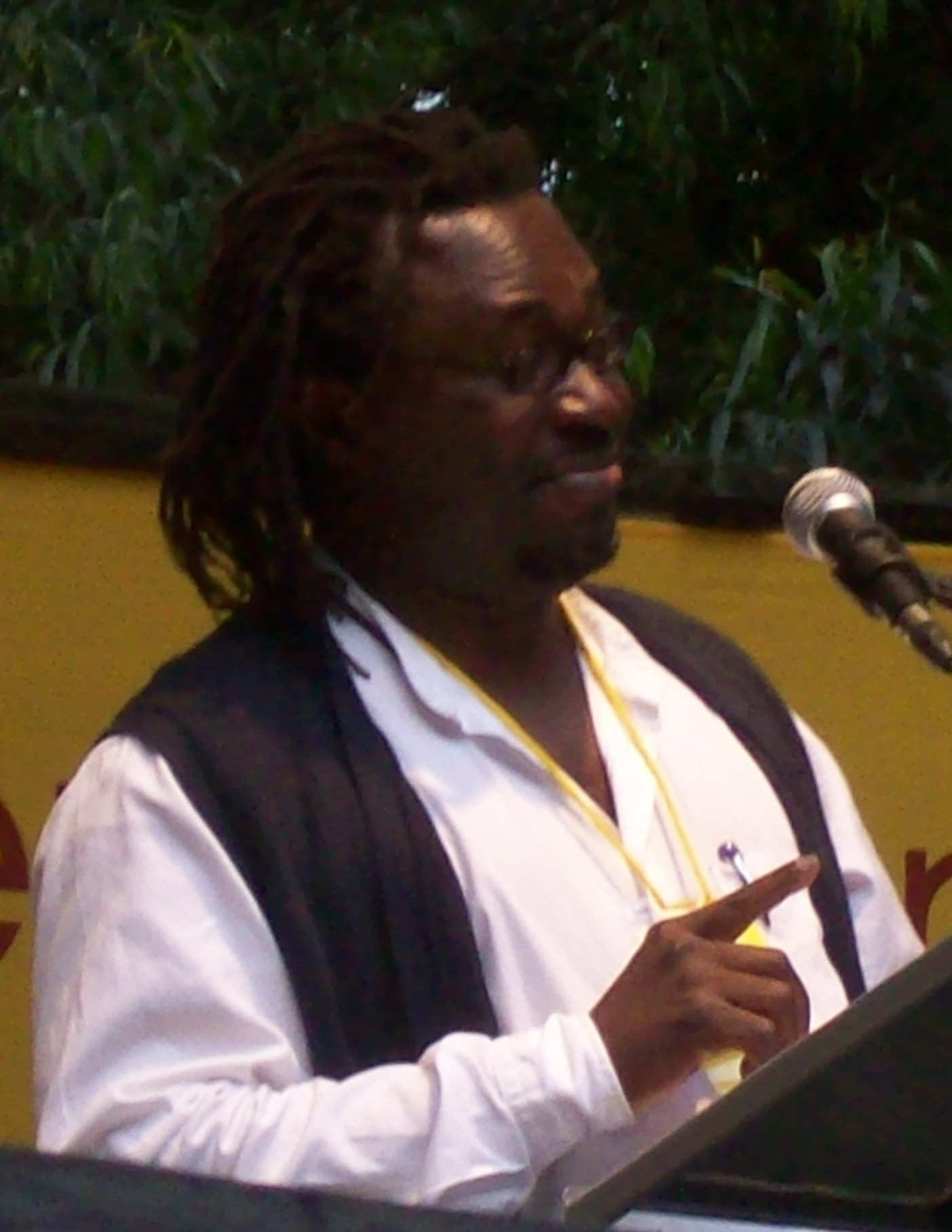
- An image of Obi Nwakanma
- Born: 18 December 1966 (age 59); Ibadan, Oyo State, Nigeria
- Citizenship: Nigerian/American
- Education: Government College, Umuahia; University of Jos; Washington University in St. Louis; Saint Louis University
- Occupations: Lecturer, poet
- Writing career
- Language: Igbo, English
- Notable work: Birthcry

Obi Nwakanma is a Nigerian poet, literary critic, journalist and academic at University of Central Florida. He writes a regular Sunday column on Vanguard called The Orbit. His works have also appeared in The Punch, ThisDay and TheCable.

== Biography ==
Nwakanma was born in Ibadan, Nigeria. He was educated at Government College Umuahia. He studied English at the University of Jos, and poetry at Washington University in St. Louis where he received his master's degree in Fine Art. He further went to Saint Louis University in St. Louis, Missouri, where he got his Ph.D. He is currently a professor at University of Central Florida.

== Bibliography ==
- The Horsemen And Other Poems
- Christopher Okigbo 1930-67: Thirsting for Sunlight
- Birthcry
