= Chinedu Tochukwu Okere =

Nigerian politician

Hon. Tochukwu Chinedu Okere

Member, House of Representatives
- Incumbent
- Assumed office 2023
- Constituency: Owerri Federal Constituency (Owerri Municipal/Owerri North/Owerri West)

Personal details
- Born: March 26, 1975
- Party: Labour Party (LP)
- Education: Bachelor of Technology (B.Tech)
- Occupation: Politician

Tochukwu Chinedu Okere is a Nigerian politician who currently represents Owerri Federal Constituency in the Federal House of Representatives.

== Early life and education ==
Chinedu Okere was born on March 26, 1975. He attended Government College Umuahia in Abia State and subsequently Federal University of Technology Owerri (FUTO). He holds a Bachelor of Technology (B.Tech) degree in Project Management.

== Political Career ==
In the 2023 general elections, Okere was elected to the House of Representatives to represent the Owerri Federal Constituency under the Labour Party.

Upon the inauguration of the 10th National Assembly, he was appointed as the Chairman of the House Committee on Diaspora. He also serves as the Vice Chairman of the House Committee on Christian Pilgrimage Affairs.
