= Idah Peterside =

Nigerian footballer

Personal information
- Date of birth: 25 November 1973 (age 52)
- Place of birth: Port Harcourt, Nigeria
- Position: Goalkeeper

Senior career*
| Years | Team | Apps | (Gls) |
- BCC Lions
- Enyimba F.C.
| 1999 | Temba Classic | | |
| 2001–2002 | Moroka Swallows F.C. | | |

International career
| 1998–2001 | Nigeria | | (0) |
- * Club domestic league appearances and goals

Idah Peterside (born 25 November 1974) is a Nigerian former football goalkeeper and media officer, television pundit and pastor.

He retired from active football in 2002. He is currently a football analyst for SuperSport and Pastor at Christ Ambassadors Church based in Kempton Park, east of Johannesburg.
