= Domingo Okorie =

Nigerian scientist

- Born: 25 September 1942
- Citizenship: Nigerian
- Occupations: Chemist; Educationist; consultant

Domingo Okorie was a Nigerian professor of chemistry and secretary of the Nigerian Academy of Science. He died in Ibadan on 6 January 2023.
