= Bede Okigbo =

Nigerian plant pathologist and geneticist (1926–2017)

Bede Nwoye Okigbo
- Eze-Okigbo I n’Ojoto
- Born: September 29, 1926; Ireh, Ojoto
- Died: 31 March 2017 (aged 90); Nnewi
- Resting place: Ire, Ojoto
- Education: Government College, Umuahia; Washington State University; Cornell University
- Occupation: Agronomist
- Years active: c. 1958–1997
- Employer(s): United Nations University; International Institute for Tropical Agriculture; University of Nigeria
- Known for: Plant pathology Plant genetics
- Partner: Philomena Okigbo (m. 1950–2017)
- Children: 6
- Relatives: Christopher Okigbo; Pius Okigbo

Bede Nwoye Okigbo (September 29, 1926 – March 31, 2017) was a plant pathologist and geneticist, traditionalist and former Vice-Chancellor of University of Nigeria, Nnsukka.

== Early life and education ==
Bede Nwoye Okigbo, from Ireh town of Ojoto in Anambra State, was born into the family of the Okigbos who were popular for their academic pursuits and achievements in the 20th century Nigeria. His father, Chief 'Ozo' Nnebue Okigbo was a high-ranking chief in his community and an arch-traditionalist. (His first cousins were the poet Christopher Okigbo and the statesman Pius Okigbo.)

He attended the Government College, Umuahia in 1943 where he developed his love for agriculture and plants and completed his secondary education. From 1948 - 52, he studied at Moor Plantain, Ibadan. Subsequently, he attended the Washington State University on a Ford Foundation scholarship and earned his bachelor's graduate in 1953 on Botany, and Cornell University to earn his PhD in Agronomy in 1958.

== Academic career ==
Bede was a former director of the United Nations University Programme on Natural Resources, Nairobi, and was amongst the pioneer agronomists in Nigeria with specialisation in plant breeding and entomology. He also was, at different times, the dean of agriculture at the University of Nigeria, deputy director at the International Institute for Tropical Agriculture (IITA), Ibadan, and Director of Natural Resources Programme at the United Nations University, Japan. He also taught crop science and genetics and experimenting with food crops cultivation, and has presented papers to the international community on local agricultural and farming practices, amongst others.

== Military stint ==
During the Biafran War, Bede was the coordinator of a unit known as the Land Army whose remit was to boost large scale and small agriculture practices down to the grassroot level. He was the Dean of Agriculture at the University of Nigeria, Nsukka at that point.

== Personal life ==
Bede was married to his wife, Philomena and they have six children.

=== Honors ===
Bede was honored by the National Universities Commission at its second 'Nigerian Universities Distinguished Professors Awards', for his outstanding excellence and contribution to the educational sector. He was also a Knight of St. Mulumba (KSM).

=== Later life and death ===
He presented a paper at the Ahiajoku Festival in 1980 and retired to Ojoto in 1997. He took up the traditional Ozo title and was named Eze-Okigbo 1 n'Ojoto. He died on 31 March 2017.
