= Michael Odokara-Okigbo =

American singer (born 1990)

Michael O.
- Also known as: Michael O.
- Born: Michael Odokara-Okigbo; 8 January 1990 (age 36); New York, United States.
- Genres: Afrobeats; Pop
- Occupations: Singer; songwriter; record producer
- Years active: 2013–present
- Label: ESM Entertainment
- Website: themichaelo.com

YouTube information
- Channel: Michael O.
- Subscribers: 17 Thousand
- Views: 2.19 Million
- Last updated: 4 August 2026

Michael Odokara-Okigbo (born 8 January 1990), known professionally as Michael O, is a singer, songwriter and record producer best known for leading his college singing group, the Dartmouth Aires, to a second-place finish on the NBC show The Sing Off.

== Career ==
He performed songs such as "Midnight Train to Georgia", "Somebody to Love", "Higher Ground", "Pinball Wizard", and "Paradise by the Dashboard Light". Ben Folds of Ben Folds Five commented that Odakara-Okigbo has a "timeless style", and Shawn Stockman of Boyz II Men declared that Odakara-Okigbo is "a freaking superstar!" He has performed at Lincoln Center, the White House, and has sung the National Anthem in venues all around the country.

On August 13, 2013, Odokara-Okigbo (under the name "Michael O") released his first EP, In the Beginning, to critical acclaim.

In 2015, Odakara-Okigbo appeared in the motion picture Pitch Perfect 2, and is also featured on the soundtrack (which won the AMA for best soundtrack). He also appeared as the feature vocalist on tracks for DJs such as Option4, Flex Cop and Gladiator.

Odakara-Okigbo has performed at venues such as the Merrill Auditorium in Portland, Maine, the Lincoln Center, and for President Obama in the White House.

In November 2017, Odakara-Okigbo won the HAPA Award for Best Upcoming Artist for his record, Your Way.

Odakara-Okigbol's single "Umbrella" was released on June 1, 2018.

In addition to his music career, Odakara-Okigbo, throughout his life, has always focused on charity work. At the age of fourteen, Odakara-Okigbo founded The Mugadi Foundation, a non-profit organization that provides education in the Global South.

He lives in Los Angeles and is a graduate of Dartmouth College and the Waynflete School in Portland, Maine.

Odokara-Okigbo is the grandson of Pius Okigbo.

== Discography ==
In the Beginning (2013)

== See also ==
- Waynflete School
