= The Sing-Off season 3 =

The Sing-Off
- Season 3
- Hosted by: Nick Lachey
- Judges: Ben Folds; Shawn Stockman; Sara Bareilles
- Winner: Pentatonix
- Runner-up: Dartmouth Aires

Release
- Original network: NBC
- Original release: September 19 – November 28, 2011

Season chronology
- ← Previous; Season 2 Next → Season 4

The third season of The Sing-Off premiered on September 19, 2011. The number of a cappella groups was increased from 10 to 16, resulting in a new format. The show created two brackets, with only half the groups performing each week for the first few weeks. Nick Lachey stayed as host for the new season, as did Ben Folds and Shawn Stockman as judges. New to the judges' table was Sara Bareilles, who replaces Nicole Scherzinger, who left after 2 seasons to become a judge on The X Factor. Deke Sharon returned as music director and vocal producer. The music staff included Ed Boyer, Ben Bram, Rob Dietz, and Christopher Diaz. The program ran for 11 episodes, and concluded on November 28, 2011, with Pentatonix winning the title.

== Groups ==
Contestant	School	Finish	Number of members	Website
Pentatonix; Arlington, TX	NA	Winner on November 28, 2011	5	
Dartmouth Aires; Hanover, NH	Dartmouth College	Second Place on November 28, 2011	16	
Urban Method; Denver, CO	NA	Third Place on November 28, 2011	8	
Afro-blue; Washington, DC	Howard University	Eliminated 13th on November 21, 2011	10	
Vocal Point; Provo, UT	Brigham Young University	Eliminated 12th on November 14, 2011	9	
Delilah; Los Angeles, CA	NA	Eliminated 11th on November 7, 2011	8	
YellowJackets; Rochester, NY	University of Rochester	Eliminated 10th on October 31, 2011	15	
The Collective; Nashville, TN	NA	Eliminated 9th on October 24, 2011	9	
The Deltones; Newark, DE	The University of Delaware	Eliminated 8th on October 17, 2011	15	
North Shore; Boston, MA	NA	Eliminated 7th on October 17, 2011	5	
Sonos; Los Angeles, CA	NA	Eliminated 6th on October 10, 2011	5	
Kinfolk 9 Los Angeles, CA	NA	Eliminated 5th on October 3, 2011	9	
Soul'd Out; Wilsonville, OR	Wilsonville High School	Eliminated 4th on September 26, 2011	16	
Messiah's Men; Minneapolis, MN	NA	Eliminated 3rd on September 26, 2011	9	
The Cat's Pajamas; Branson, MO	NA	Eliminated 2nd on September 19, 2011	5	
Fannin Family; Hortonville, WI	NA	Eliminated 1st on September 19, 2011	8	

== Elimination Table ==
Legend
Place in bracket (Bracket ID)

Eliminated	Sing-Off Battle	Last safe	Safe	Third	Runner-up	Winner

Date:		9/19 (A); 9/26 (B)	10/3 (A); 10/10 (B)	10/17	10/24	10/31	11/7	11/14	11/21	11/28
Place	Group	Result								
1	Pentatonix	2nd (B1)	3rd (B)	1st (2)	1st (2)	2nd	1st	1st	2nd	Winner
2	Dartmouth Aires	1st (B1)	2nd (B)	3rd (1)	2nd (1)	1st	3rd	3rd	Sing-Off	Second Place
3	Urban Method	2nd (A2)	2nd (A)	2nd (2)	3rd (2)	6th	2nd	2nd	1st	Third Place
4	Afro-Blue	2nd (A1)	4th (A)	4th (2)	1st (1)	5th	5th	4th	Eliminated	
5	Vocal Point	1st (A2)	1st (A)	3rd (2)	3rd (1)	3rd	4th	Eliminated		
6	Delilah	1st (A1)	5th (A)	4th (1)	2nd (2)	4th	Eliminated			
7	The YellowJackets	3rd (A1)	3rd (A)	2nd (1)	Sing-Off	Eliminated				
8	The Collective	2nd (B2)	5th (B)	1st (1)	Eliminated					
9	The Deltones	3rd (B2)	4th (B)	Eliminated (2)						
10	North Shore	1st (B2)	1st (B)	Eliminated (1)						
11	Sonos	3rd (B1)	Eliminated (B)							
12	Kinfolk 9	3rd (A2)	Eliminated (A)							
13	Soul'd Out	Eliminated (B2)								
14	Messiah's Men	Eliminated (B1)								
15	The Cat's Pajamas	Eliminated (A2)								
16	Fannin Family	Eliminated (A1)								

== Performances ==
=== Episode 1 ===
- Theme: Contestants' choice
- Group performance: "Fuckin' Perfect" by Pink

A summary of the groups' performances on the first live show, along with the results.
Group	Order	Song	Result	Popularity on iTunes
First Half
The YellowJackets	1	"Wavin' Flag" by K'naan	Last Safe	2
Fannin Family	2	"Who Says" by Selena Gomez & the Scene	Eliminated	7
Afro-Blue	3	"Put Your Records On" by Corinne Bailey Rae	Safe	4
Delilah	4	"Grenade" by Bruno Mars	Safe	1
Second Half
Urban Method	5	"Love the Way You Lie" by Eminem and Rihanna	Safe	3
The Cat's Pajamas	6	"Some Kind of Wonderful" by Grand Funk Railroad	Eliminated	8
Kinfolk 9	7	"Secrets" by OneRepublic	Last Safe	6
Vocal Point	8	"Jump Jive an' Wail" by The Brian Setzer Orchestra	Safe	5
Swan songs
Fannin Family	1	"Tomorrow" from Annie		
The Cat's Pajamas	2	"Bye Bye Love" by The Everly Brothers		

=== Episode 2 ===
- Theme: Contestants' choice
- Group performance: "Sing" by My Chemical Romance

A summary of the groups' performances on the second live show, along with the results.
Group	Order	Song	Result	Popularity on iTunes*
First Half
Dartmouth Aires	1	"Higher Ground" by Stevie Wonder	Safe	2
Pentatonix	2	"E.T." by Katy Perry	Safe	1
Messiah's Men	3	"People Get Ready" by The Impressions	Eliminated	2
Sonos	4	"Wicked Game" by Chris Isaak	Last Safe	2
Second Half
The Collective	5	"Rolling in the Deep" by Adele	Safe	2
Soul'd Out	6	"Aquarius/Let the Sunshine In" by The 5th Dimension	Eliminated	2
North Shore	7	"Runaround Sue" by Dion DiMucci	Safe	2
Deltones	8	"Feels Like Home" by Randy Newman	Last Safe	2
Swan songs
Messiah's Men	1	"Swing Low, Sweet Chariot"		
Soul'd Out	2	"Mama, I'm Coming Home" by Ozzy Osbourne		

* For this episode, only the song by Pentatonix appears to have had any significant iTunes sales.

=== Episode 3 ===
- Theme: Radio Hits (first round), 60's Classics (second round)
- Group performance: "Somewhere Only We Know" by Keane

A summary of the groups' performances on the third live show, along with the results.
Group	Order	First song	Popularity on iTunes*	Order	Second song	Popularity on iTunes*	Result
Vocal Point	1	"Never Say Never" by Justin Bieber	4	9	"The Way You Look Tonight" by Frank Sinatra	4	Safe
Delilah	2	"Whataya Want From Me" by Adam Lambert	1	7	"(Love Is Like A) Heatwave" by Martha & the Vandellas	4	Last Safe
Urban Method	3	"Just Can't Get Enough" by The Black Eyed Peas	4	8	"Dance To The Music" by Sly and the family Stone	4	Safe
Afro-Blue	4	"American Boy" by Estelle ft. Kanye West	2	10	"I Heard It Through The Grapevine" by The Miracles	4	Safe
The YellowJackets	5	"Dynamite" by Taio Cruz	4	11	"Can't Take My Eyes Off You" by Frankie Valli	4	Safe
Kinfolk 9	6	"Price Tag" by Jessie J ft. B.o.B	4	12	"Let It Be" by The Beatles	3	Eliminated
Swan song
Kinfolk 9	1	"Loser" by Beck					

* For this episode, only the top three songs appear to have differed significantly from the others in iTunes sales.

=== Episode 4 ===
- Theme: Radio Hits (first round), 60's Classics (second round)
- Group performance: "Rhythm of Love" by Plain White T's

A summary of the groups' performances on the fourth live show, along with the results.
Group	Order	First song	Order	Second song	Result
Deltones	1	"The Edge of Glory" by Lady Gaga	8	"You Can't Hurry Love" by The Supremes	Safe
Pentatonix	2	"Your Love Is My Drug" by Kesha	7	"Piece of My Heart" by Janis Joplin	Safe
The Collective	3	"Rocketeer" by Far East Movement	10	"Hold On, I'm A Comin'" by Sam & Dave	Last Safe
North Shore	4	"The Lazy Song" by Bruno Mars	9	"Unchained Melody" by The Righteous Brothers	Safe
Dartmouth Aires	5	"Animal" by Neon Trees	12	"Pinball Wizard" by The Who	Safe
Sonos	6	"Viva la Vida" by Coldplay	11	"I Want You Back" by The Jackson 5	Eliminated
Swan song
Sonos	1	"It's So Hard to Say Goodbye to Yesterday" by Boyz II Men			

=== Episode 5 ===
- Theme: Guilty pleasures
- Group performance: "All Night Long (All Night)" by Lionel Richie*

A summary of the groups' performances on the fifth live show, along with the results.
Group	Order	Song	Result
First Half
The YellowJackets	1	"Wannabe" by Spice Girls	Safe
Delilah	2	"Flashdance... What a Feeling" by Irene Cara	Last Safe
North Shore	3	"The Power of Love" by Huey Lewis and the News	Eliminated
The Collective	4	"I Will Survive" by Gloria Gaynor	Safe
Dartmouth Aires	5	"Jessie's Girl" by Rick Springfield	Safe
Second Half
Afro-Blue	6	"I Wanna Dance With Somebody (Who Loves Me)" by Whitney Houston	Last Safe
Pentatonix	7	"Video Killed the Radio Star" by The Buggles	Safe
Deltones	8	"Listen to Your Heart" by Roxette	Eliminated
Urban Method	9	"Poison" by Bell Biv DeVoe	Safe
Vocal Point	10	"Footloose" by Kenny Loggins	Safe
Swan songs
North Shore	1	"Goodnite, Sweetheart, Goodnite" by The Spaniels	
Deltones	2	"Goodbye to You" by Michelle Branch	

* This song marks the biggest performance in television history.

=== Episode 6 ===
- Theme: Hip-Hop
- Group performance: "Nothin' on You" by B.o.B featuring Bruno Mars

A summary of the groups' performances on the sixth live show, along with the results.
Group	Order	Song	Result
First Half
Dartmouth Aires	1	"Club Can't Handle Me" by Flo Rida	Safe
Afro-Blue	2	"Killing Me Softly" by The Fugees	Safe
The Collective	3	"Give Me Everything" by Pitbull ft. Ne-Yo	Bottom Two
Vocal Point	4	"I'll Be Missing You" by Puff Daddy ft. Faith Evans & 112	Last Safe
Second Half
Urban Method	5	"Airplanes" by B.o.B ft. Hayley Williams	Last Safe
Pentatonix	6	"Love Lockdown" by Kanye West	Safe
Delilah	7	"How to Love" by Lil Wayne	Safe
The YellowJackets	8	"The Show Goes On" by Lupe Fiasco	Bottom Two
The Sing Off Battle
The Collective	1	"Just a Dream" by Nelly	Eliminated
The YellowJackets	2	"Just a Dream" by Nelly	Safe
Swan song
The Collective	1	"Knockin' on Heaven's Door" by Bob Dylan	

=== Episode 7 ===
- Theme: Superstar medleys
- Group performance: Halloween medley of "This Is Halloween" by Danny Elfman, "Werewolves of London" by Warren Zevon and "Ghostbusters" by Ray Parker Jr.
- Guest performance: Chris Brown medley by Committed

A summary of the groups' performances on the seventh live show, along with the results.
Group	Order	Medley	Result
Urban Method	1	Rihanna medley of "What's My Name?", "Umbrella" and "Only Girl (In the World)"	Last Safe
Vocal Point	2	Elvis Presley medley of "Don't Be Cruel", "Can't Help Falling in Love" and "Jailhouse Rock"	Safe
Afro-Blue	3	Janet Jackson medley of "What Have You Done For Me Lately", "When I Think of You" and "Miss You Much"	Safe Group 2
Dartmouth Aires	4	Queen medley of "Killer Queen", "Bohemian Rhapsody" and "Somebody to Love"	Safe
Pentatonix	5	Britney Spears medley of "Oops!... I Did It Again", "Toxic" and "Hold It Against Me"	Safe
Delilah	6	Alicia Keys medley of "Fallin', "A Woman's Worth" and "If I Ain't Got You"	Safe Group 2
The YellowJackets	7	Billy Joel medley of "The River of Dreams", "She's Always a Woman" and "Uptown Girl"	Eliminated
Swan song
The YellowJackets	1	"Tubthumping" by Chumbawamba (with lyrics referencing the show and the hosts)	

=== Episode 8 ===
- Theme: Rock classics (first round), Country hits (second round)
- Group performance: "Wake Up" by Arcade Fire

A summary of the groups' performances on the eighth live show, along with the results.
Group	Order	First song	Order	Second song	Result
Pentatonix	1	"Born to Be Wild" by Steppenwolf	12	"Stuck Like Glue" by Sugarland	Safe
Dartmouth Aires	2	"We're Not Gonna Take It" by Twisted Sister	7	"Save a Horse, Ride a Cowboy" by Big & Rich	Safe
Afro-Blue	3	"American Girl" by Tom Petty and the Heartbreakers	8	"Need You Now" by Lady Antebellum	Last Safe
Delilah	4	"Dream On" by Aerosmith	10	"If I Die Young" by The Band Perry	Eliminated
Urban Method	5	"Here I Go Again" by Whitesnake	9	"Before He Cheats" by Carrie Underwood	Safe
Vocal Point	6	"You Really Got Me" by The Kinks	11	"Life is a Highway" by Rascal Flatts	Safe
Swan song
Delilah	1	"Survivor" by Destiny's Child			

=== Episode 9 ===
- Theme: R&B Current Hits (first round), R&B Classics (second round)
- Group performance: R&B medley of "I Got You (I Feel Good)" by James Brown, "ABC" by The Jackson 5 and "Crazy in Love" by Beyoncé feat. Jay-Z

A summary of the groups' performances on the ninth live show, along with the results.
Group	Order	First song	Order	Second song	Result
Dartmouth Aires	1	"Ignition (Remix)" by R. Kelly	6	"Midnight Train to Georgia" by Gladys Knight & the Pips	Safe
Urban Method	2	"Knock You Down" by Keri Hilson feat. Kanye West and Ne-Yo	7	"It's Your Thing" by The Isley Brothers	Safe
Vocal Point	3	"Every Little Step" by Bobby Brown	8	"Ain't Too Proud to Beg" by The Temptations	Eliminated
Afro-Blue	4	"We Belong Together" by Mariah Carey	9	"Best of My Love" by The Emotions	Last Safe
Pentatonix	5	"OMG" by Usher feat. will.i.am	10	"Let's Get It On" by Marvin Gaye	Safe
Swan song
Vocal Point	1	"Home" by Michael Bublé			

=== Episode 10 ===
- Theme: Master Mix (combining 2 songs from different artists) (first round), Judges' Choice (second round)
- Group performance: Master Mix: "Bitter Sweet Symphony" by The Verve, "Hollaback Girl" by Gwen Stefani, "Baba O'Riley" by The Who, and "Last Friday Night (T.G.I.F.)" by Katy Perry

A summary of the groups' performances on the tenth live show, along with the results.
Group	Order	First song	Order	Second song	Result
Pentatonix	1	Medley of "Forget You" by Cee Lo Green and "Since U Been Gone" by Kelly Clarkson	5	"Dog Days Are Over" by Florence and the Machine	Safe
Urban Method	2	Medley of "Hot in Herre" by Nelly and "Fever" by Peggy Lee	6	"All of the Lights" by Kanye West	Safe
Afro Blue	3	Medley of "I Believe I Can Fly" by R. Kelly and "Fly" by Nicki Minaj	7	"A Change Is Gonna Come" by Sam Cooke	Eliminated
Dartmouth Aires	4	Medley of "Sympathy for the Devil" by The Rolling Stones and "Born This Way" by Lady Gaga	8	"Shout" by The Isley Brothers	Last Safe
The Sing Off Battle (reprise of most impactful song)
Afro Blue	1	"American Boy" by Estelle ft. Kanye West			Eliminated
Dartmouth Aires	2	"Somebody to Love" by Queen			Safe
Swan song
Afro Blue	1	"We've Only Just Begun" by The Carpenters			

=== Episode 11 ===
- Group performance: "The Way You Make Me Feel" by Michael Jackson
- Closing performance: "Happy Christmas (War is Over)" by John Lennon and Yoko Ono (sung by 14 a cappella groups: most were from the show's second season)

A summary of the groups' performances on the eleventh live show, along with the results.
Group	Order	First song	Order	Second song	Result
Pentatonix	1	"Without You" by David Guetta feat. Usher	4	"Give Me Just One Night (Una Noche)" by 98 Degrees (with Nick Lachey)	Winner
Urban Method	2	"Stereo Hearts" by Gym Class Heroes feat. Adam Levine	5	"Gonna Get Over You" by Sara Bareilles (with Sara Bareilles)	Third
Dartmouth Aires	3	"Paradise by the Dashboard Light" by Meat Loaf (with Amy Whitcomb of Delilah)	6	"Not the Same" by Ben Folds (with Ben Folds)	Runner up
Top 10 Ladies	7	"(You Make Me Feel Like) A Natural Woman" by Aretha Franklin			
Top 10 Guys	8	"Born to Run" by Bruce Springsteen			
Afro Blue	9	"You've Really Got a Hold on Me" by The Miracles (with Smokey Robinson)			
Swan songs
Urban Method	1	"Coming Home" by Diddy – Dirty Money feat. Skylar Grey			Third
Dartmouth Aires	2	"Somewhere" from West Side Story			Runner up
Victory song
Pentatonix	"Eye of the Tiger" by Survivor				Winner

== Ratings ==
=== US Nielsen ratings ===
Order	Airdate	Rating/Share (18–49)	Viewers (millions)	Rank (Timeslot)	Rank (Night)
1	September 19, 2011	1.9/5	5.30	#4	#9
2	September 26, 2011	1.7/4	4.45	#4	#9
3	October 3, 2011	1.8/4	4.89	#4	#10
4	October 10, 2011	1.5/4	4.35	#4	#11
5	October 17, 2011	1.6/4	4.34	#4	#10
6	October 24, 2011	1.5/4	4.63	#4	#9
7	October 31, 2011	1.4/4	4.40	#4	#10
8	November 7, 2011	1.5/4	4.25	#4	#10
9	November 14, 2011	1.3/4	4.13	#4	#10
10	November 21, 2011	1.4/4	4.27	#4	#10
11	November 28, 2011	1.6/4	5.98	#4	#10
