= Nigerian Tobacco Company =

Defunct Nigerian tobacco company

- Formerly: British American Tobacco (operations in Nigeria before 1951)
- Company type: Public-private partnership (initially)
- Industry: Tobacco
- Predecessor: British American Tobacco's Nigerian operations
- Founded: 1951
- Founder: British American Tobacco; Nigerian government
- Defunct: 2000
- Fate: Merged with British American Tobacco
- Successor: British American Tobacco (Nigeria)
- Headquarters: Nigeria
- Number of locations: 3 factories
- Area served: Nigeria
- Products: Cigarettes
- Production output: 700 million per month (1970 est.) (1970)
- Brands: Benson and Hedges, State Express 555, Three Rings, Gold Leaf, Sweet Menthol
- Owner: Nigerian government; British American Tobacco
- Number of employees: 2,700 (1966)

Nigerian Tobacco Company was a cigarette manufacturing, distribution and marketing company that was owned by the Nigerian government and British American Tobacco. The company operated factories in Ibadan, Muchia Zaria in Kaduna and Port Harcourt. The company's key products were Benson and Hedges, State Express, Three Rings, Gold Leaf and Sweet menthol.

The firm was founded in 1951 as a partnership between British American Tobacco (BAT) and the Nigerian government to acquire the assets of British American Tobacco in Nigeria. BAT had been trading in Nigeria since 1911 until the operations became the Nigerian Tobacco Company (NTC). In 1966, the firm employed 2,700 Nigerians and dominated the cigarette market with a market 90% share.

== History ==
=== Business operations ===
Distribution and sale of cigarettes in Nigeria began in the 1890s and in 1911, cigarette consumption was dominated by products manufactured by British American Tobacco company. To liaise with distributors and monitor product sales and promotion by trading firms who were the importers and distributors of the products, BAT sent a trade representative to Nigeria. A few years later, it established its own depots and began importing products into the country for onward delivery to expatriate firms for local distribution. In the early 1930s, BAT began its own investigations into developing a local industry that will be supplied by quality tobacco leaves, this occurred after an earlier collaboration with the department of Agriculture on experimental cultivation of some varieties. In 1933, the firm established a pilot factory in Osogbo using imported tobacco leaves as raw material. To develop a local supply source, the firm distributed seedlings to farmers in nearby settlements within Oyo province. Many farmers embraced tobacco farming and chose tobacco as their main crop instead of crop rotation.

To ensure supply of its raw materials, NTC invested in the training of tobacco farmers and invested in research and development of new methods to cultivate tobacco. When demand grew, production from the pilot factory was insufficient to meet demand and British American Tobacco established a larger factory in Ibadan in 1937, production at the factory was expanded after World War II.

In 1956, the firm opened a new factory in the Eastern region of the country at Port Harcourt and three years later it opened another one in Zaria, Northern Region. Production of cigarettes by NTC was estimated to be 700 million per month in 1970.

Beginning in 1962, the firm shifted its distribution strategy from dealing with multinationals and moved towards building relationships with independent Nigerian retailers.

=== Tobacco cultivation ===
NTC was involved in the cultivation of tobacco particularly in the grasslands of Northern Oyo Province working directly with farmers organized into agricultural cooperatives with the support of NTC.

Experiments with various varieties of Virginia tobacco begun much earlier than 1933 but British American Tobacco pilot's project at an old cotton ginnery in Osogbo set the stage for the growth of commercial tobacco farming. In the early 1930s, BAT distributed free seeds of the Virginia variety and in 1934 about 83 acres of land were cultivated gradually rising to an average of 935 acres between 1944 and 1946 and 11,200 between 1960 and 1962. The firm facilitated the use of fertilizers and mechanized inputs through credit extension to tobacco farmers. NTC's relationship with farmers grew into the 1950s and it began to advancing loans to farmers to enable them grow flue-cure tobacco and build curing barns at the onset of cultivation. Contracts were signed with farmers that ensured NTC bought produce from the farmers.

=== Ownership ===
NTC was formed in 1951 to acquire the trading assets of British American Tobacco company's operation in Nigeria. In 1960, ownership was opened Nigerians when shares of the firm were among the foundation firms listed on the Lagos Stock Exchange.

After a period of decline, NTC and BAT merged in 2000.
