= Philip O. Emafo =

Drug legalization advocate

Philip O. Emafo, a Nigerian, is a former president of the International Narcotics Control Board and a vocal critic of drug legalization. Prior to serving on the INCB, he was a pharmacist.
