= J. O. J. Okezie =

Nigerian doctor and politician

Minister of Health
- President: Yakubu Gowon

Minister of Agriculture

Personal details
- Born: Josiah Onyebuchi Johnson Okezie; 1923
- Died: 2002 (aged 78–79)
- Party: Republican Party; National Party of Nigeria
- Occupation: Physician, politician
- Known for: Nigerian Minister of Health and Agriculture

Josiah Onyebuchi Johnson Okezie (1923 — 2002) was a Nigerian doctor and politician who was Minister of Health and later Agriculture in the administration of Yakubu Gowon.

In the first republic, Okezie led the Republican Party, a marginal party into an alliance with NPC and NNDP led by Akintola. In the 1970s, his efforts as Health Minister help transform the agricultural research station at Umudike into a federal research institute.

Okezie was a member of the Constituent Assembly and later joined NPN during the second republic. His name came up among those considered as vice presidential candidate to party nominee, Shehu Shagari.

He was a graduate of Government College, Umuahia. He formed Ibeku Central Hospital, Umuahia, which was open but badly affected during the Biafran War.
