= Adebowale Adefuye =

Nigerian historian and diplomat (1947–2015)

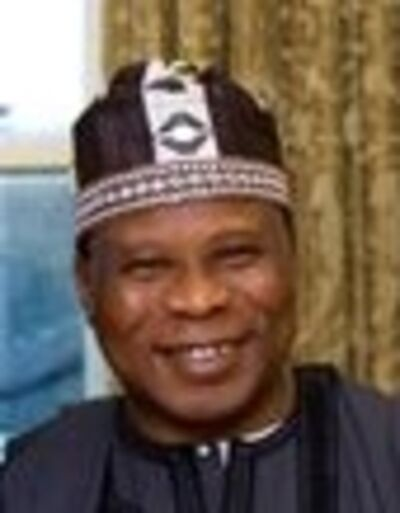
- Adefuye during a visit to the White House, March 29, 2010
- Born: Adebowale Ibidapo Adefuye; January 1947; Ijebu-Igbo
- Died: August 27, 2015 (aged 68); Washington, D.C., US
- Education: University of Ibadan
- Occupations: Historian and diplomat
- Known for: Diplomacy

Adebowale Ibidapo Adefuye (January 1947 – August 27, 2015) was a Nigerian historian and diplomat.

== Academic career ==
Born in Ijebu-Igbo, Adefuye attended the University of Ibadan, first graduating in 1969. He obtained a PhD in history from the same institution in 1973. During his academic career, Adefuye was named a Fulbright Scholar and used the funds to do research at Columbia University, the University of North Florida, and the University of Florida. Adefuye taught at the University of Lagos, heading the school's history department from 1985 to 1987.

== Diplomatic career ==
He was named the ambassador to Jamaica in 1987, serving until 1991. During that period, Adefuye also concurrently served as the ambassador to Belize and Haiti. He was then the Deputy High Commissioner to the United Kingdom. Adefuye left that post to serve as the deputy director of the Commonwealth of Nations for fourteen years. After leaving the Commonwealth, he became an advisor to the Economic Community of West African States in 2008. President Goodluck Jonathan appointed Adefuye the ambassador to the United States in 2010. During his tenure, Adefuye continually advocated for the United States to provide more military aid to Nigeria to effectively counter the forces of Boko Haram. He was recalled in 2015 after Muhammadu Buhari was sworn in as president of Nigeria.

He died in Washington, D.C., on August 27, 2015, of a heart attack.
