= Pius Okigbo =

Nigerian economist (1924–2000)

Pius Okigbo (6 February 1924 – 2000) was a Nigerian economist.

== Biography ==
Born 6 February 1924, Okigbo was the older brother of the poet Christopher Okigbo and his first cousin was the academic, Bede Okigbo. Receiving his secondary schooling at Christ the King College, Onitsha, Pius passed his Cambridge School Certificate examination in Grade one in December 1940 with an exemption from the University of London matriculation.

In 1941, Okigbo was admitted into the prestigious Yaba Higher College, Lagos, for a diploma course in arts (1941–1942). Due to conversion of Yaba College into a military base for the Royal West African Force during World War II, in 1942 he was transferred to the Achimota College in Accra, Gold Coast (now Ghana), where he completed his studies in Latin, Greek, history, English language, and literature with a diploma certificate in 1943. Okigbo also earned a Bachelor of Science degree in Economics through private study, after, he proceeded to Northwestern University, where he earned an MA and Ph.D in Economics.

As a scholar, Okigbo contributed a great deal in propelling into academic discourse, new methods for solving African economic problems. As an economist with sensitivity to historical changes, Okigbo researched and wrote about the origins, evolution and transformation of major economic policies and was practical in his identification and application of competing theories of development that he thought suitable for the realities of the political economy of Nigeria and Africa. He gained academic acclaim in Nigeria when he published a book on the national accounting standard of Nigeria. He was then appointed as the economic adviser to the governor of the defunct Eastern region of Nigeria.

As an erudite scholar on public finance, he lent his service to public scholarship and policy, he was chairman in a number of Nigerian committees, particularly those dealing with the economic direction of the country. In 1994, as chairman of a committee to probe the activities of the Central Bank of Nigeria, he released a report critical of the government's role in mismanaging 12.4 billion dollars of oil revenues accrued primarily to two special accounts. The panel's report is popularly known as the Okigbo report.

Okigbo died in 2000.
