= Okechukwu Nwadiuto Emuchay =

Nigerian diplomat

Okey Emuchay, MFR
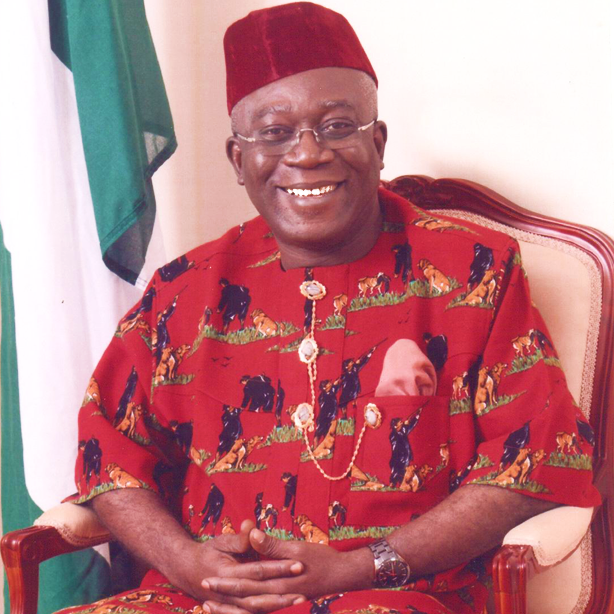
- Ambassador Okechukwu Nwadiuto Emuchay
- Born: Okechukwu Nwadiuto Emuchay; 9 November 1960 (age 65); Aba, Abia State, Nigeria

Okechukwu Nwadiuto Emuchay (born 9 November 1960), also referred to as "Okey Emuchay," is a diplomat and formerly Nigeria's Consul-General to South Africa.

== Early life ==
Ambassador Emuchay (MFR), popularly known as Okey Emuchay, was born in the city of Aba in Nigeria on November 9, 1960, to the late Sir (Dr) Dick Waobianyi Emuchay (MFR) and Lady (Mrs.) Christiana Nne Emuchay (Ada Ugo Abia) of Azumini, Ndoki in Ukwa East LGA, Abia State. He is the third of eight children. Okey Emuchay's father, Sir D. W. Emuchay, was a medical doctor and administrator who was born in 1919 in Abak, in today’s Akwa Ibom State had a very successful career as a doctor and went on to become one of the most prominent medical doctors in Nigeria.

The federal government of Nigeria recognized his contributions to nation building in 1986 through the most deserved conferment of the Member of the Federal Republic (MFR).

== Career and national service ==
Until his voluntary retirement, Emuchay served in Nigeria's foreign service for 31 years. He was the award-winning Nigeria’s Consul-General in Johannesburg, South Africa. As a career diplomat, he had previously served in Angola, United Kingdom and Austria. His tour of duty in Johannesburg commenced at a turbulent time when nations were adjusting their foreign policies to post-apartheid South Africa. However, he proved his mettle by bringing a new dimension to citizen diplomacy and navigated Nigeria’s national interest and aspirations through these challenging moments, guiding her to resolve many knotty issues that would have ruined the significant Nigeria-South African relations. Emuchay (MFR) played a pivotal role in not just bridge building but in guiding policy and national responses to the issues and manifestations of xenophobia in post-apartheid South Africa, especially where it took the form of attacks on Nigerians and Nigerian interests in South Africa. He helped resolve many other diplomatic-cum-political rows, like the one involving the unlawful repatriation of Nigerians.

He is considered one of the most accomplished Nigerian diplomats, for which he received the National Award of Member of the Federal Republic (MFR) in 2012 from President Goodluck Jonathan. It is said that Emuchay was one of the most respected diplomats in the Southern African Development Community (SADC) Region.

In 2013, while Nigeria's Consul-General in South Africa, he received the Community Service Award from the Nigerian Community in South Africa. Emuchay's citation for the award stated: "The CG as he is fondly called is a man of the people. Combining diplomatic and political sagacity, the CG has contributed tremendously in alleviating difficulties faced by Nigerians in South Africa. His administrative skills have helped with challenges of getting or renewing Nigerian passports in South Africa. While, he has never shied from calling to order erring Nigerians, Mr. Emuchay has never failed to speak up for upstanding Nigerians whose rights are violated in South Africa. The CG has also on most occasions provided needed assistance to seek redress for such Nigerians and, as well as engaging with relevant authorities."

After his voluntary retirement from Nigeria's foreign service, he declared interest to contest the 2015 governorship election in Abia State.

== Personal life ==
He is married to Mrs. Jane Okey Emuchay.
